= 6174 =

Natural number

← 6173	6174	6175 →
- List of numbers; Integers; ← 0 1k 2k 3k 4k 5k 6k 7k 8k 9k →
- Cardinal: six thousand one hundred seventy-four
- Ordinal: 6174th (six thousand one hundred seventy-fourth)
- Factorization: 2 × 3^{2} × 7^{3}
- Divisors: 1, 2, 3, 6, 7, 9, 14, 18, 21, 42, 49, 63, 98, 126, 147, 294, 343, 441, 686, 882, 1029, 2058, 3087, 6174
- Greek numeral: ,ϚΡΟΔ´
- Roman numeral: V̅MCLXXIV, or V̅I̅CLXXIV
- Binary: 1100000011110_{2}
- Ternary: 22110200_{3}
- Senary: 44330_{6}
- Octal: 14036_{8}
- Duodecimal: 36A6_{12}
- Hexadecimal: 181E_{16}

6174 (six thousand, one hundred [and] seventy-four) is the natural number following 6173 and preceding 6175.

== In Mathematics ==
It is a composite number, abundant number, and Kaprekar's Constant.
