= 8128 =

← 8127	8128	8129 →
- List of numbers; Integers; ← 0 1k 2k 3k 4k 5k 6k 7k 8k 9k →
- Cardinal: eight thousand one hundred twenty-eight
- Ordinal: 8128th (eight thousand one hundred twenty-eighth)
- Factorization: 2^{6} × 127
- Divisors: 1, 2, 4, 8, 16, 32, 64, 127, 254, 508, 1016, 2032, 4064, 8128
- Greek numeral: ,ΗΡΚΗ´
- Roman numeral: V̅MMMCXXVIII, or V̅I̅I̅I̅CXXVIII
- Binary: 1111111000000_{2}
- Ternary: 102011001_{3}
- Senary: 101344_{6}
- Octal: 17700_{8}
- Duodecimal: 4854_{12}
- Hexadecimal: 1FC0_{16}

8128 (eight thousand one hundred [and] twenty-eight) is the natural number and integer following 8127 and preceding 8129.

== In mathematics ==
It is most notable for being the fourth perfect number (its proper divisors 1, 2, 4, 8, 16, 32, 64, 127, 254, 508, 1016, 2032, and 4064 add up to 8128), and one of the earliest numbers to be recognized as such. As a perfect number, it is tied to the Mersenne prime 127, 2^{7} – 1, with 2^{6} (2^{7} – 1) yielding 8128. Also related to it being a perfect number, 8128 is a harmonic divisor number.

Another consequence of 8128 being a perfect number is that it has the same prime factors as the sum of its divisors, and its cototient is a power of two.

== See also ==
- 8128 Nicomachus
