= 1124 (number) =

← 1123	1124	1125 →
- List of numbers; Integers; ← 0 1k 2k 3k 4k 5k 6k 7k 8k 9k →
- Cardinal: one thousand one hundred twenty-four
- Ordinal: 1124th (one thousand one hundred twenty-fourth)
- Factorization: 2^{2} × 281
- Divisors: 1, 2, 4, 281, 562, 1124
- Greek numeral: ,ΑΡΚΔ´
- Roman numeral: MCXXIV, mcxxiv
- Binary: 10001100100_{2}
- Ternary: 1112122_{3}
- Senary: 5112_{6}
- Octal: 2144_{8}
- Duodecimal: 798_{12}
- Hexadecimal: 464_{16}

1124 (one thousand one hundred [and] twenty-four) is the natural number following 1123 and preceding 1125.

== In mathematics ==
1124 is the number of normal 4x4 matrices with entries (0,1), the number of balls in a pyramid with base either a regular hexagon or a hexagon with alternate sides differing by 1 (balls in hexagonal pyramid of height 16 taken from hexagonal close-packing), and the number of binary sequences of length 12 with no initial repeats.

=== Snowflake sequence ===
32nd stage of the snowflake sequence

In a variation of the toothpick sequence, the snowflake sequence, (or the E-toothpick sequence) are three toothpicks formed as a trident or a bird's footprint. These are called E-toothpicks. The E-toothpick contains a midpoint and three exposed endpoints such as the distance between the endpoint of the central toothpick and the endpoints of the other toothpicks is equal to 1. Start at round 0 with no E-toothpicks, at round 1 we place two back-to-back E-toothpicks, forming a star with six endpoints, round 2 we add six more E-toothpicks, at round 3 we add six more E-toothpicks, and so on.

The rule for adding new E-toothpicks is as follows. Each E-toothpick has three ends, which are initially free. If the ends of two E's meet, those ends are no longer free. To go from round n to round n+1, an E-toothpick is added at each free end, which extends that end in the direction it is pointing, subject to the condition that no end of any new E can touch any end of an existing E from round n or earlier, but two new E's are allowed to touch. In the 32nd step, the number of E-toothpicks is 1124.
