= 7825 =

← 7824	7825	7826 →
- List of numbers; Integers; ← 0 1k 2k 3k 4k 5k 6k 7k 8k 9k →
- Cardinal: seven thousand, eight hundred [and] twenty-five
- Ordinal: 7825th
- Factorization: 5^{2} × 313
- Divisors: 1, 5, 25, 313, 1565, 7825
- Greek numeral: ,ΖΩΚΕ´
- Roman numeral: V̅MMDCCCXXV, or V̅I̅I̅DCCCXXV
- Binary: 1111010010001_{2}
- Ternary: 101201211_{3}
- Senary: 100121_{6}
- Octal: 17221_{8}
- Duodecimal: 4641_{12}
- Hexadecimal: 1E91_{16}

7825 (seven thousand, eight hundred [and] twenty-five) is the natural number following 7824 and preceding 7826.

== In mathematics ==
- 7825 is the smallest number n when it is impossible to assign two colors to natural numbers 1 through n such that every Pythagorean triple is multicolored, i.e. where the Boolean Pythagorean triples problem becomes false. The 200-terabyte proof to verify this is the largest ever made.
