= 9855 =

Natural number

← 9854	9855	9856 →
- List of numbers; Integers; ← 0 1k 2k 3k 4k 5k 6k 7k 8k 9k →
- Cardinal: nine thousand eight hundred fifty-five
- Ordinal: 9855th (nine thousand eight hundred fifty-fifth)
- Factorization: 3^{3} × 5 × 73
- Divisors: 1, 3, 5, 9, 15, 27, 45, 73, 135, 219, 365, 657, 1095, 1971, 3285, 9855
- Greek numeral: ,ΘΩΝΕ´
- Roman numeral: I̅X̅DCCCLV, i̅x̅dccclv
- Binary: 10011001111111_{2}
- Ternary: 111112000_{3}
- Senary: 113343_{6}
- Octal: 23177_{8}
- Duodecimal: 5853_{12}
- Hexadecimal: 267F_{16}

9855 (nine thousand eight hundred fifty-five) is the natural number following 9854 and preceding 9856.

== In mathematics ==
It is the sum of all the numbers in any given row, column, or diagonal of the 27 × 27 magic square, as shown in the following calculation:

$9855 = \frac{1}{27} \sum_{k=1}^{27^2} k = \frac{27 \times (27^2 + 1)}{2}$

The 27 × 27 magic square contains 1 to 729, with 365 in the center.

9855 is also the number of days in 27 years; C.A. Brown hypothesized in a 1906 edition of The Monist that this number could have held a significance for Ancient Greeks as the "dividing line between the ages when men and women should begin to bear children to the State, 20-27 years for women, 27-34 years for men"
