= 1000 (number) =

Natural number

← 999	1000	1001 →
- List of numbers; Integers; ← 0 1k 2k 3k 4k 5k 6k 7k 8k 9k →
- Cardinal: one thousand
- Ordinal: 1000th (one thousandth)
- Factorization: 2^{3} × 5^{3}
- Divisors: 1, 2, 4, 5, 8, 10, 20, 25, 40, 50, 100, 125, 200, 250, 500, 1000
- Greek numeral: ,Α´
- Roman numeral: M, m
- Roman numeral (unicode): M, m, ↀ
- Unicode symbol: ↀ
- Greek prefix: chilia
- Latin prefix: milli
- Binary: 1111101000_{2}
- Ternary: 1101001_{3}
- Senary: 4344_{6}
- Octal: 1750_{8}
- Duodecimal: 6B4_{12}
- Hexadecimal: 3E8_{16}
- Tamil: ௲
- Chinese: 千
- Punjabi: ੧੦੦੦
- Devanagari: १०००
- Armenian: Ռ
- Egyptian hieroglyph: 𓆼

1000 or one thousand is the natural number following 999 and preceding 1001. In most English-speaking countries, it can be written with or without a comma or sometimes a period separating the thousands digit: 1,000.

A group of one thousand units is sometimes known, from Ancient Greek, as a chiliad. A period of one thousand years may be known as a chiliad or, more often from Latin, as a millennium. The number 1000 is also sometimes described as a short thousand in medieval contexts where it is necessary to distinguish the Germanic concept of 1200 as a long thousand. It is the first 4-digit integer.

== Notation ==
- The decimal representation for one thousand is
  - 1000—a one followed by three zeros, in the general notation;
  - 1 × 10^{3}—in engineering notation, which for this number coincides with:
  - 1 × 10^{3} exactly—in scientific normalized exponential notation;
  - 1 E+3 exactly—in scientific E notation.
- The SI prefix for a thousand units is "kilo-", abbreviated to "k"—for instance, a kilogram or "kg" is a thousand grams. This is sometimes extended to non-SI contexts, such as "ka" (kiloannum) being used as a shorthand for periods of 1000 years. In computer science, however, "kilo-" is used more loosely to mean 2 to the 10th power (1024 or 2^{10}).
- In the SI writing style, a non-breaking space can be used as a thousands separator, i.e., to separate the digits of a number at every power of 1000.
- Multiples of thousands are occasionally represented by replacing their last three zeros with the letter "K" or "k": for instance, writing "$30k" for $30,000 or using "Y2K" to denote the Year 2000 computer problem.
- A thousand units of currency, especially dollars or pounds, are colloquially called a grand. In the United States, this is sometimes abbreviated with a "G" suffix.

== In mathematics ==
A chiliagon is a 1000-sided polygon.

A cube number, 1000 = 10^{3}. In a mathematical coincidence, this number is close to 2^{10} = 1024, giving rise to the use of “kilobyte” to refer to a size of 1,024 bytes (now properly called a “kibibyte”).

== Numbers in the range 1001–1999 ==
=== 1001 to 1099 ===
==== 1004 ====
1004 = 2^{2} × 251. It is a heptanacci number.

==== 1009 ====
1009 is the smallest four-digit prime, a Lucky prime, and Chen prime. It is palindromic in bases 11, 15, 19, 24 and 28: (838_{11}, 474_{15}, 2F2_{19}, 1I1_{24}, 181_{28}).

==== 1011 ====
1011 = 3 × 337. It is a Harshad number in bases 5, 10, 15, 20, 25, 30, 35, 40, 45, 50, 55, 60, 65, 70, 75 (and 202 other bases). It is the largest natural number n such that 2^{n} contains 101 and does not contain 11011. There are 1011 partitions of 1 into reciprocals of positive integers <= 16 Egyptian fraction.

==== 1013 ====
1013 is a prime number, a Sophie Germain prime, and a centered square number,

==== 1016 ====
1016 = 2^{3} × 127. It is stella octangula number and a member of the Mian–Chowla sequence. There are 1016 surface points on a cube with edge-length 14.

==== 1019 ====
1019 is a Sophie Germain prime, a safe prime, and a Chen prime.

==== 1021 ====
1021 is a Lucky prime and a twin prime with 1019.

==== 1025 ====
1025 = 5^{2} × 41. It is a Jacobsthal-Lucas number and the hypotenuse of a primitive Pythagorean triangle. It is a Proth number because 1025 = 2^{10} + 1. It is a member of the Moser–de Bruijn sequence because its base-4 representation (100001_{4}) contains only digits 0 and 1, or equivalently, it's a sum of distinct powers of 4 (4^{5} + 4^{0}).

==== 1028 ====
1028 = 2^{2} × 257. It is sum of totient function for first 58 integers.

==== 1029 ====
There are 1029 primes <= 2^{13}.

==== 1031 ====
1031 is a prime number, a Sophie Germain prime, a super-prime, and a Chen prime. It is the exponent and number of ones for the fifth base-10 repunit prime.

==== 1033 ====
1033 is a prime number and an emirp. It forms a twin prime pair with 1031.

==== 1035 ====
1035 = 3^{2} × 5 × 23. It is a hexagonal number and the 45th triangular number.

==== 1039 ====
1039 is a Chen prime and a Lucky prime. There are 1039 partitions of 30 that do not contain 1 as a part.

==== 1040 ====
1040 = 2^{4} × 5 × 13. There are 1040 pieces that could be seen in a 6 × 6 × 6 × 6 Rubik's Tesseract.

==== 1046 ====
1046 = 2 × 523. It is a coefficient of f(q), the 3rd order mock theta function.

==== 1049 ====
1049 is a prime number, a Sophie Germain prime, a highly cototient number, and a Chen prime.

==== 1051 ====
1051 is a prime number, a centered pentagonal number, and a centered decagonal number.

==== 1056 ====
1056 = 2^{5} × 3 × 11. It is a pronic number.

==== 1060 ====
1060 = 2^{2} × 5 × 53. It is the sum of the first twenty-five primes from 2 through 97 (the number of primes less than 100) and the sixth sum of 10 consecutive primes, starting with 23 through 131.

==== 1061 ====
1061 is a prime number, an emirp, and a twin prime with 1063. There are 1061 prime numbers between 1000 and 10000 (or, number of four-digit primes in decimal representation).

==== 1063 ====
1063 is a prime number, a super-prime, a twin prime with 1061, and the sum of seven consecutive primes (137 + 139 + 149 + 151 + 157 + 163 + 167)

==== 1065 ====
1065 = 3 × 5 × 71. It is a Sphenic number.

==== 1069 ====
1069 is a prime number and an emirp.

==== 1076 ====
1076 = 2^{2} × 269. There are 1076 strict trees weight 11.

==== 1078 ====
1078 = 2 × 7^{2} × 11. It is an Euler transform of negative integers.

==== 1080 ====
1080 = 2^{3} × 3^{3} × 5. It is a pentagonal number and a largely composite number.

==== 1081 ====
1081 = 23 × 47. It is the 46th triangular number and a member of Padovan sequence.

==== 1086 ====
1086 = 2 × 3 × 181. It is a Smith number and the sum of totient function for the first 59 integers.

==== 1087 ====
1087 is a prime number, a super-prime, a cousin prime, and a lucky prime.

==== 1091 ====
1091 is a prime number, a cousin prime, and a twin prime with 1093.

==== 1093 ====
1093 is a twin prime with 1091. Together with 1091 and 1097, it forms a prime triplet. It is a happy prime and a star prime. It is also the smallest Wieferich prime. 1093 is a repunit prime in base 3 because:

$$1093 = 1111111_3 = 3^6 + 3^5 + 3^4 + 3^3 + 3^2 + 3^1 + 3^0 = \frac{3^7-1}{2} \, .$$

==== 1097 ====
1097 is a prime number, an emirp, and a Chen prime.

=== 1100 to 1199 ===
==== 1102 ====
1102 = 2 × 19 × 29. It is the sum of the totient function for the first 60 integers.

==== 1103 ====
1103 is a prime number, a Sophie Germain prime, and a balanced prime.

==== 1104 ====
1104 = 2^{4} × 3 × 23. It is a Keith number

==== 1109 ====
1109 is a Chen prime.

==== 1113 ====
1113 = 3 × 7 × 53. There are 1113 strict partitions of 40.

==== 1117 ====
1117 is a Chen prime. There are 1117 diagonally symmetric polyominoes with 16 cells.

==== 1118 ====
1118 = 2 × 13 × 43. There are 1118 unimodular 2 × 2 matrices having all terms in {0,1,...,21}.

==== 1119 ====
1119 = 3 × 373. There are 1119 bipartite graphs with 9 nodes.

==== 1122 ====
1122 = 2 × 3 × 11 × 17. It is a pronic number.

==== 1123 ====
1123 is a balanced prime.

==== 1126 ====
1126 = 2 × 563. There are 1126 2 × 2 non-singular integer matrices with entries from {0, 1, 2, 3, 4, 5}.

==== 1127 ====
1127 = 7^{2} × 23. It is the maximum number of pieces that can be obtained by cutting an annulus with 46 cuts.

==== 1128 ====
1128 = 2^{3} × 3 × 47. It is the 47th triangular number and the 24th hexagonal number. 1128 is the dimensional representation of the largest vertex operator algebra with central charge of 24, D_{24}.

1151 is the first prime number following a prime gap of 22. It is also a Chen prime.

==== 1152 ====
1152 = 2^{7} × 3^{2}. It is a highly totient number, a 3-smooth number, and an Achilles number.

==== 1153 ====
1153 is a super-prime and a Proth prime.

==== 1159 ====
1159 = 19 × 61. It is a centered octahedral number and a member of the Mian–Chowla sequence.

==== 1160 ====
1160 = 2^{3} × 5 × 29. It is an octagonal number.

==== 1161 ====
1161 = 3^{3} × 43. It is the sum of the first twenty-six primes.

==== 1162 ====
1162 = 2 × 7 × 83. It is the sum of the totient function for the first 61 integers and a pentagonal number.

==== 1163 ====
1163 is a Chen prime.

==== 1164 ====
1164 = 2^{2} × 3 × 97. There are 1164 chains of multisets that partition a normal multiset of weight 8, where a multiset is normal if it spans an initial interval of positive integers

==== 1169 ====
1169 = 7 × 167. It is a highly cototient number

==== 1171 ====
1171 is a super-prime.

==== 1173 ====
1173 = 3 × 17 × 23. There are 1173 simple triangulations on a plane with 9 nodes.

==== 1174 ====
1174 = 2 × 587. There are 1174 widely totally strongly normal compositions of 16. (sequence A332337 in the OEIS).

==== 1175 ====
1175 = 5^{2} × 47. It is the maximum number of pieces that can be obtained by cutting an annulus with 47 cuts.

==== 1176 ====
1176 = 2^{3} × 3 × 7^{2}. It is the 48th triangular number.

==== 1178 ====
1178 = 2 × 19 × 31. There are 1178 surface points on a cube with edge-length 15.

==== 1179 ====
1179 = 3^{2} × 131. There are 1179 different permanents of binary 7 by 7 matrices.

==== 1182 ====
1182 = 2 × 3 × 197. There are 1182 necklaces possible with 14 beads of 2 colors (that cannot be turned over).

==== 1184 ====
1184 = 2^{5} × 37. It is an amicable number with 1210.

==== 1186 ====
1186 = 2 × 593. There are 1186 diagonally symmetric polyominoes with 15 cells.

==== 1187 ====
1187 is a safe prime, a Stern prime, a balanced prime, and a Chen prime.

==== 1190 ====
1190 = 2 × 5 × 7 × 17. It is a pronic number. Building a 28-tier house of cards requires 1190 cards.

==== 1191 ====
1191 = 3 × 397 = 35^{2} - 35 + 1 = H_{35}, the 35th Hogben number.

==== 1192 ====
1192 = 2^{3} × 149. It is the sum of the totient function for the first 62 integers.

==== 1193 ====
1193 is a Chen prime.

4^{1193} - 3^{1193} is prime.

==== 1198 ====
1198 = 2 × 599. It is a centered heptagonal number.

=== 1200 to 1299 ===
==== 1200 ====
1200 = 2^{4} × 3 × 5^{2}. There are 1200 households in the Nielsen ratings sample.

1200 is known as the long thousand or ten "long hundreds" of 120 each. It is the traditional reckoning of large numbers in Germanic languages.

==== 1201 ====
1201 is a super-prime, a centered square number, and a centered decagonal number.

==== 1202 ====
1202 = 2 × 601. There are a maximum of 1202 regions when the plane is divided by 25 ellipses.

==== 1203 ====
1203 = 3 × 401. It is the smallest number greater than 1000 in the coordinating sequence for the (2,6,∞) tiling of the hyperbolic plane.

==== 1204 ====
1204 = 2^{2} × 7 × 43. It is the magic constant for a 7 × 7 × 7 magic cube.

==== 1205 ====
1205 = 5 × 241. There are 1205 partitions of 28 such that the number of odd parts is a part

==== 1207 ====
1207 = 17 × 71. It is a composite de Polignac number.

==== 1208 ====
1208 = 2^{3} × 151. There are 1208 strict chains of divisors starting with the superprimorial A006939(3).

==== 1210 ====
1210 = 2 × 5 × 11^{2}. It is an amicable number with 1184 and a Self-descriptive number.

==== 1211 ====
1211 = 7 × 173. It is a composite de Polignac number

==== 1212 ====
1212 = 2^{2} × 3 × 101 = $\sum_{k=0}^{17} p(k)$, where $p(k)$ is the number of partitions of $k$.

==== 1213 ====
1213 is a prime number and an emirp.

==== 1214 ====
1214 = 2 × 607. It is a spy number and the sum of the first 39 composite numbers.

==== 1215 ====
1215 = 3^{5} × 5. There are 1215 edges in the hexagonal triangle T(27)

==== 1216 ====
1216 = 2^{6} × 19. It is a nonagonal number

==== 1217 ====
1217 is a super-prime and a Proth prime.

==== 1219 ====
1219 = 23 × 53. It is a centered triangular number and a zero of Mertens function.

==== 1220 ====
1220 = 2^{2} × 5 × 61. It is a zero of Mertens function. There are 1220 binary vectors of length 16 containing no singletons.

==== 1222 ====
1222 = 2 × 13 × 47. It is a hexagonal pyramidal number.

==== 1223 ====
1223 is the 200th prime number. It is also a Sophie Germain prime and a balanced prime.

==== 1224 ====
1224 = 2^{3} × 3^{2} × 17. There are 1224 edges in the join of two cycle graphs, both of order 34.

==== 1225 ====
1225 = 5^{2} × 7^{2} = 35^{2}. It is the smallest number greater than 1 to be a triangular number, a square number and a hexagonal number. It is the second square triangular number greater than 1. It is the 49th triangular number, the 35th square number, the 25th hexagonal number, a centered octagonal number, a 29-gonal number, a 60-gonal number, and a 124-gonal number. It is the sum of 5 consecutive odd cubes:

1225 = 1^{3} + 3^{3} + 5^{3} + 7^{3} + 9^{3}.

==== 1226 ====
1226 = 2 × 613. There are 1226 rooted identity trees with 15 nodes.

==== 1228 ====
1228 = 2^{2} × 307. It is the sum of the totient function for the first 63 integers.

==== 1229 ====
1229 is a Sophie Germain prime and an emirp. There are 1229 primes less than 10,000.

==== 1230 ====
1230 = 2 × 3 × 5 × 41 = T(9, 6), the Mahonian number.

==== 1231 ====
1231 is a prime number and an emirp.

==== 1232 ====
1232 = 2^{4} × 7 × 11. There are 1232 labeled ordered set of partitions of a 7-set into odd parts.

==== 1240 ====
1240 = 2^{3} × 5 × 31. It is a square pyramidal number.

==== 1241 ====
1241 = 17 × 73. It is a centered cube number and a spy number.

==== 1243 ====
1243 = 11 × 113. It is a composite de Polignac number.

==== 1244 ====
1244 = 2^{2} × 311. There are 1244 complete partitions of 25.

==== 1245 ====
1245 = 3 × 5 × 83. There are 1245 labeled spanning intersecting set-systems on 5 vertices.

==== 1247 ====
1247 = 29 × 43. It is a pentagonal number.

==== 1249 ====
1249 is a prime number, an emirp, and a trimorphic number.

==== 1257 ====
1257 = 3 × 419. There are 1257 lattice points inside a circle of radius 20.

==== 1259 ====
1259 is a prime number and a highly cototient number.

==== 1261 ====
1261 = 13 × 97. It is a star number and a zero of Mertens function.

==== 1264 ====
1264 = 2^{4} × 79. It is the sum of the first 27 primes.

==== 1265 ====
1265 = 5 × 11 × 23. There are 1265 rooted trees with 43 vertices in which vertices at the same level have the same degree.

==== 1266 ====
1266 = 2 × 3 × 211. It is a centered pentagonal number and a zero of Mertens function.

==== 1269 ====
1269 = 3^{3} × 47. Completing 11 revolutions in the Spiral of Theodorus requires 1269 triangles.

==== 1275 ====
1275 = 3 × 5^{2} × 17. It is the 50th triangular number.

==== 1276 ====
1276 = 2^{2} × 11 × 29. There are 1276 irredundant sets in the 25-cocktail party graph.

==== 1277 ====
1277 is a prime number. It is the start of a prime constellation of length 9 (a "prime nonuple").

==== 1278 ====
1278 = 2 × 3^{2} × 71. There are 1278 Narayana's cows and calves after 20 years.

==== 1279 ====
1279 is a prime number and a Mersenne prime exponent.

==== 1280 ====
1280 = 2^{8} × 5. There are 1280 parts in all compositions of 9.

==== 1281 ====
1281 = 3 × 7 × 61. It is an octagonal number.

==== 1283 ====
1283 is a safe prime.

==== 1284 ====
1284 = 2^{2} × 3 × 107 = 641 + 643, the sum of a twin prime pair.

==== 1285 ====
1285 = 5 × 257. There are 1285 free nonominoes.

==== 1286 ====
1286 = 2 × 643. There are 1286 inequivalent connected planar figures that can be formed from five 1 X 2 rectangles (or dominoes) such that each pair of touching rectangles shares exactly one edge, of length 1, and the adjacency graph of the rectangles is a tree.

==== 1288 ====
1288 = 2^{3} × 7 × 23. It is a heptagonal number.

==== 1289 ====
1289 is Sophie Germain prime and a twin prime with 1291. 1289 is a deficient number because the sum of all its positive divisors (except itself) totals less than 1289. 1289 is an evil number because it has an even number of 1's contained in its binary expansion.

==== 1291 ====
1291 is a twin prime with 1289.

==== 1296 ====
1296 = 2^{4} × 3^{4} = 6^{4} = 36^{2}. It is the sum of the cubes of the first eight positive integers:

1^{3} + 2^{3} + 3^{3} + 3^{3} + 4^{3} + 5^{3} + 6^{3} + 7^{3} + 8^{3} = 1296.

There are 1296 rectangles on a normal 8 × 8 chessboard. There are 1296 combinations of 2 alphanumeric characters.

==== 1297 ====
1297 is a super-prime, a pinwheel number, and a zero of Mertens function.

=== 1300 to 1399 ===
==== 1300 ====
1300 = 2^{2} × 5^{2} × 13. It is a zero of Mertens function and the smallest even odd-factor hyperperfect number. It is the sum of the first 4 fifth powers:

1300 = 1^{5} + 2^{5} + 3^{5} + 4^{5}.

==== 1301 ====
1301 is a prime number and a centered square number. There are 1301 trees with 13 unlabeled nodes.

==== 1306 ====
1306 = 2 × 653. It is a centered triangular number.

==== 1307 ====
1307 is a safe prime.

==== 1308 ====
1308 = 2^{2} × 3 × 109. It is the sum of the totient function for the first 65 integers.

==== 1312 ====
1312 = 2^{5} × 41. It is a member of the Mian-Chowla sequence.

==== 1319 ====
1319 is a safe prime.

==== 1325 ====
1325 = 5^{2} × 53. It is a Markov number and a centered tetrahedral number.

==== 1326 ====
1326 = 2 × 3 × 13 × 17. It is the 51st triangular number and a hexagonal number.

==== 1327 ====
1327 is the smallest prime number preceding a prime gap of 34.

==== 1328 ====
1328 = 2^{4} × 83. It is the sum of the totient function for the first 66 integers.

==== 1330 ====
1330 = 2 × 5 × 7 × 19. It is a tetrahedral number. It forms a Ruth–Aaron pair with 1331 under second definition.

==== 1331 ====
1331 = 11^{3}. It is a centered heptagonal number. It forms a Ruth–Aaron pair with 1330 under second definition.

==== 1335 ====
1335 = 3 × 5 × 89. It is a pentagonal number.

==== 1342 ====
1342 = 2 × 11 × 61 = $\sum_{k=1}^{40} \sigma(k)$.

==== 1346 ====
1346 = 2 × 673. There are 1346 locally disjointed rooted trees with 10 nodes.

==== 1350 ====
1350 = 2 × 3^{3} × 5^{2}. It is a nonagonal number.

==== 1361 ====
1361 is first prime number following a prime gap of 34 and the 3rd Mills' prime. It is a centered decagonal number

==== 1364 ====
1364 = 2^{2} × 11 × 31. It is a Lucas number.

==== 1365 ====
1365 = 3 × 5 × 7 × 13. It is a pentatope number.

==== 1367 ====
1367 is a safe prime and a balanced prime. It is the sum of three, nine, and eleven consecutive primes: (449 + 457 + 461, 131 + 137 + 139 + 149 + 151 + 157 + 163 + 167 + 173, and 101 + 103 + 107 + 109 + 113 + 127 + 131 + 137 + 139 + 149 + 151),

==== 1369 ====
1369 is a semiprime and a square number. It is also a centered octagonal number (A016754), a truncated triangular number (A051936), sum of 11 positive 6th powers (A003367) and a hypotenuse for which there exist exactly 2 distinct integer triangles (A084646).

==== 1371 ====
1371 = 3 × 457. It is the sum of the first 28 primes.

==== 1377 ====
1377 = 3^{4} × 17. It is the maximal number of pieces that can be obtained by cutting an annulus with 51 cuts

==== 1378 ====
1378 = 2 × 13 × 53. It is the 52nd triangular number

==== 1379 ====
1379 = 7 × 197. It is the magic constant of n × n normal magic square and n-queens problem for n = 14.

==== 1380 ====
1380 = 2^{2} × 3 × 5 × 23. There are 1380 8-step mappings with 4 inputs.

==== 1381 ====
1381 is a prime number and a centered pentagonal number.

==== 1384 ====
1384 = 2^{3} × 173 = $\sum_{k=1}^{41} \sigma(k)$

==== 1385 ====
1385 = 5 × 277. It is an up/down number.

==== 1387 ====
1387 = 19 × 73. It is the 5th Fermat pseudoprime of base 2, the 22nd centered hexagonal number, the 19th decagonal number, and the second Super-Poulet number.

==== 1388 ====
1388 = 2^{2} × 347. Because 1388 = 4 × 19^{2} - 3 × 19 + 1, is on the x-axis of Ulams spiral.

==== 1394 ====
1394 = 2 × 17 × 41. It is the sum of the totient function for the first 67 integers.

==== 1395 ====
1395 = 3^{2} × 5 × 19. It is a vampire number and a member of the Mian–Chowla sequence

==== 1396 ====
1396 = 2^{2} × 349. It is a centered triangular number.

==== 1399 ====
1399 is a prime number and an emirp.

=== 1400 to 1499 ===
==== 1403 ====
1403 = 23 × 61. It is the smallest number x such that M(x) = 11, where M() is Mertens function

==== 1404 ====
1404 = 2^{2} × 3^{2} × 13. It is a heptagonal number.

==== 1405 ====
1405 = 5 × 281 = 26^{2} + 27^{2} = 7^{2} + 8^{2} + ... + 16^{2}. It is a centered square number

==== 1406 ====
1406 = 2 × 19 × 37. It is a semi-meandric number.

==== 1409 ====
1409 is a super-prime, a Sophie Germain prime, and a Proth prime.

==== 1410 ====
1410 = 2 × 3 × 5 × 47. It is the denominator of the 46th Bernoulli number

==== 1418 ====
1418 = 2 × 709. It is the smallest number x such that M(x) = 13, where M() is Mertens function

==== 1419 ====
1419 = 3 × 11 × 43. It is a sphenic number, and a Zeisel number.

==== 1423 ====
1423 is a prime number. It is the number of digits of the third Cullen prime.

1423 (or 14/23) is considered a hate symbol associated with the Southern Brotherhood.

==== 1425 ====
1425 = 3 × 5^{2} × 19. It is a self-descriptive number in base 5.

==== 1426 ====
1426 = 2 × 23 × 31. It is a pentagonal number and the sum of the totient function for the first 68 integers. There are 1426 strict partitions of 42.

==== 1427 ====
1427 is a twin prime with 1429.

==== 1428 ====
1428 = 2^{2} × 3 × 7 × 17. There are 1428 complete ternary trees with 6 internal nodes or, equivalently, 18 edges.

==== 1429 ====
1429 is a twin prime with 1427.

==== 1430 ====
1430 = 2 × 5 × 11 × 13. It is a Catalan number.

==== 1431 ====
1431 = 3^{3} × 53. It is the 53rd triangular number and a hexagonal number.

==== 1432 ====
1432 = 2^{3} × 179. It is a member of the Padovan sequence.

==== 1433 ====
1433 is a super-prime.

==== 1435 ====
1435 = 5 × 7 × 41. It is a vampire number.

==== 1436 ====
1436 = 2^{2} × 359. It is the discriminant of a totally real cubic field.

==== 1439 ====
1439 is a Sophie Germain prime and a safe prime.

==== 1440 ====
1440 = 2^{5} × 3^{2} × 5. It is a highly totient number.

==== 1441 ====
1441 = 11 × 131. It is a star number.

==== 1447 ====
1447 is a super-prime number and a happy number.

==== 1451 ====
1451 is a Sophie Germain prime.

==== 1452 ====
1452 = 2^{2} × 3 × 11^{2}. It is the first Zagreb index of the complete graph K_{12}.

1453

1453 is a Sexy prime with 1459.

==== 1458 ====
1458 = 2 × 3^{6}. It is the maximum determinant of an 11 by 11 matrix of zeroes and ones and a 3-smooth number.

1458 is one of three numbers which, when its base 10 digits are added together, produces a sum which, when multiplied by its reversed self, yields the original number:

1 + 4 + 5 + 8 = 18
18 × 81 = 1458
The only other non-trivial numbers with this property are 81 and 1729, as well as the trivial solutions 1 and 0. It was proven by Masahiko Fujiwara.

==== 1459 ====
1459 is a Sexy prime with 1453 and a Pierpont prime. It is the sum of nine consecutive primes:

1459 = 139 + 149 + 151 + 157 + 163 + 167 + 173 + 179 + 181.

==== 1462 ====
1462 = 2 × 17 × 43. Because 1462 = (35 - 1) × (35 + 8), it is the first Zagreb index of the wheel graph with 35 vertices

==== 1467 ====
1467 = 3^{2} × 163. There are 1467 partitions of 39 with zero crank.

==== 1469 ====
1469 = 13 × 113. It is an octahedral number and a highly cototient number.

==== 1470 ====
1470 = 2 × 3 × 5 × 7^{2}. It is the sum of the totient function for the first 69 integers.

==== 1471 ====
1471 is a super-prime number and a centered heptagonal number.

==== 1480 ====
1480 = 2^{3} × 5 × 37. It is the sum of the first 29 primes.

==== 1481 ====
1481 is a Sophie Germain prime.

==== 1485 ====
1485 = 3^{3} × 5 × 11. It is the 54th triangular number.

==== 1486 ====
1486 = 2 × 743. There are 1486 strict solid partitions of 19.

==== 1487 ====
1487 is a safe prime.

==== 1489 ====
1489 is a prime number and a centered triangular number.

==== 1490 ====
1490 = 2 × 5 × 149. It is a tetranacci number.

==== 1491 ====
1491 = 3 × 7 × 71. It is a nonogonal number.

==== 1492 ====
1492 = 2^{2} × 373. It is the discriminant of a totally real cubic field.

==== 1493 ====
1493 is a Stern prime.

==== 1494 ====
1494 = 2 × 3^{2} × 83. It is the sum of the totient function for the first 70 integers.

==== 1496 ====
1496 = 2^{3} × 11 × 17. It is a square pyramidal number.

==== 1499 ====
1499 is a Sophie Germain prime and a super-prime.

=== 1500 to 1599 ===
==== 1500 ====
1500 = 2^{2} × 3 × 5^{3}. It is the hypotenuse of three different Pythagorean triangles.

==== 1501 ====
1501 = 19 × 79. It is a centered pentagonal number.

==== 1503 ====
1503 = 3^{2} × 167. Completing 12 revolutions of the Spiral of Theodorus requires 1503 triangles.

==== 1510 ====
1510 = 2 × 5 × 151. 1510 is an untouchable number.

==== 1511 ====
1511 is a Sophie Germain prime and a balanced prime.

==== 1513 ====
1513 = 17 × 89. It is a centered square number.

==== 1520 ====
1520 = 2^{4} × 5 × 19. It is a pentagonal number. It forms a Ruth–Aaron pair with 1521 under the second definition.

==== 1521 ====
1521 = 3^{2} × 13^{2} = 39^{2}. It is a centered octagonal number. It forms a Ruth–Aaron pair with 1520 under the second definition.

==== 1523 ====
1523 is a super-prime, a safe prime, and a member of the Mian–Chowla sequence.

==== 1525 ====
1525 = 5^{2} × 61. It is a heptagonal number.

==== 1526 ====
1526 = 2 × 7 × 109. There are 1526 conjugacy classes in the alternating group A_{27}.

==== 1529 ====
1529 = 11 × 139. It is a composite de Polignac number.

==== 1530 ====
1530 = 2 × 3^{2} × 5 × 17. It is a vampire number.

==== 1531 ====
1531 is a prime number and a centered decagonal number.

==== 1532 ====
1532 = 2^{2} × 383. There are 1532 series-parallel networks with 9 unlabeled edges,

==== 1535 ====
1535 = 5 × 307. It is a Thabit number.

==== 1537 ====
1537 = 29 × 53. It is a Keith number.

==== 1539 ====
1539 = 3^{4} × 19. A maximum of 1539 pieces can be obtained by cutting an annulus with 54 cuts.

==== 1540 ====
1540 = 2^{2} × 5 × 7 × 11. It is the 55th triangular number, a hexagonal number, a decagonal number, and a tetrahedral number.

==== 1541 ====
1541 = 23 × 67. It is an octagonal number.

==== 1549 ====
1549 is a de Polignac prime.

==== 1557 ====
1557 = 3^{2} × 173. There are 1557 graphs with 8 nodes and 13 edges.

==== 1559 ====
1559 is a Sophie Germain prime.

==== 1561 ====
1561 = 7 × 223. It is a centered octahedral number.

==== 1564 ====
1564 = 2^{2} × 17 × 23. It is the sum of the totient function for the first 71 integers.

==== 1572 ====
1572 = 2^{2} × 3 × 131. It is a member of the Mian–Chowla sequence.

==== 1573 ====
1573 = 11^{2} × 13. It is the discriminant of a totally real cubic field.

==== 1583 ====
1583 is a Sophie Germain prime.

==== 1585 ====
1585 = 5 × 307. It is a centered triangular number.

==== 1588 ====
1588 = 2^{2} × 397. It is the sum of the totient function for the first 72 integers.

==== 1589 ====
1589 = 7 × 227. It is a composite de Polignac number.

==== 1593 ====
1593 = 3^{3} × 59. It is the sum of the first 30 primes.

==== 1594 ====
1594 = 2 × 797. It is the minimal cost of a maximum height Huffman tree of size 17.

==== 1596 ====
1596 = 2^{2} × 3 × 7 × 19. It is the 56th triangular number.

==== 1597 ====
1597 is a super-prime, a Fibonacci prime, a Markov prime, and an emirp.

=== 1600 to 1699 ===
==== 1601 ====
1601 is a Sophie Germain prime and a Proth prime.

==== 1607, 1609, and 1613 ====
1607, 1609, and 1613 form a prime triple.

==== 1617 ====
1617 = 3 × 7^{2} × 11. It is a pentagonal number.

==== 1618 ====
1618 = 2 × 809. It is a centered heptagonal number.

==== 1619 ====
1619 is a safe prime.

==== 1621 ====
1621 is a super-prime.

==== 1624 ====
1624 = 2^{3} × 7 × 29. There are 1624 squares in the Aztec diamond of order 28.

==== 1625 ====
1625 = 5^{3} × 13. It is a centered square number.

==== 1626 ====
1626 = 2 × 3 × 271. It is a centered pentagonal number.

==== 1633 ====
1633 = 23 × 71. It is a star number.

==== 1634 ====
1634 = 2 × 19 × 43. It is the smallest four-digit Narcissistic number in base 10.

==== 1637 ====
1637 is a prime island: it is the smallest prime whose adjacent primes are exactly 30 apart.

==== 1638 ====
1638 = 2 × 3^{2} × 7 × 13. It is a harmonic divisor number.

==== 1639 ====
1639 = 11 × 149. It is a nonagonal number.

==== 1646 ====
1646 = 2 × 823. There are 1646 graphs with 8 nodes and 14 edges.

==== 1649 ====
1649 = 17 × 97. It is a highly cototient number and a Leyland number using 4 and 5: 1649 = 4^{5} + 5^{4}.

==== 1651 ====
1651 = 13 × 127. It is a heptagonal number.

==== 1653 ====
1653 = 3 × 19 × 29. It is the 57th triangular number and a hexagonal number.

==== 1657 ====
1657 is a cuban prime.

==== 1660 ====
1660 = 2^{2} × 5 × 83. It is the sum of the totient function for the first 73 integers.

==== 1665 ====
1665 = 3^{2} × 5 × 37. It is a centered tetrahedral number.

==== 1669 ====
1669 is a super-prime. It is the smallest prime with a gap of exactly 24 to the next prime.

1679

1679 = 23 × 73. It is a highly cototient number.

==== 1680 ====
1680 = 2^{4} × 3 × 5 × 7. It is the 17th highly composite number.

==== 1681 ====
1681 = 41^{2} = 40^{2} + 40 + 41. It is the smallest number yielded by the formula n^{2} + n + 41, where n is a natural number, that is not a prime. It is also a centered octagonal number.

==== 1682 and 1683 ====
1682 and 1683 form a Ruth–Aaron pair under the first definition.

==== 1684 ====
1684 = 2^{2} × 421. It is a centered triangular number.

==== 1691 ====
1691 = 19 × 89. It is a strobogrammatic number.

==== 1695 ====
1695 = 3 × 5 × 113. It is the magic constant of n × n normal magic square and the n-queens problem for n = 15.

==== 1696 ====
1696 = 2^{5} × 53. It is the sum of the totient function for the first 74 positive integers.

==== 1697 ====
1697 is a prime number and also a twin prime with 1699.

=== 1700 to 1799 ===
==== 1705 ====
1705 = 5 × 11 × 13. It is a tribonacci number.

==== 1710 ====
1710 = 2 × 3^{2} × 5 × 19. A maximum of 1710 pieces can be obtained by cutting an annulus 57 times.

==== 1711 ====
1711 = 29 × 59. It is the 58th triangular number and a centered decagonal number.

==== 1717 ====
1717 = 17 × 101. It is a pentagonal number.

==== 1719 ====
1719 = 3^{2} × 131. it is a composite de Polignac number.

==== 1720 ====
1720 = 2^{3} × 5 × 43. It is the sum of the first 31 primes.

==== 1721 ====
1721 is a twin prime with 1723.

==== 1723 ====
1723 is a twin prime with 1721. It is also a super-prime.

==== 1733 ====
1733 is a Sophie Germain prime. It is palindromic in bases 3, 18, and 19.

==== 1736 ====
1736 = 2^{3} × 7 × 31. It is the sum of the totient function for the first 75 integers.

==== 1740 ====
1740 = 2^{2} × 3 × 5 × 29. There are 1740 squares in the Aztec diamond of order 29.

==== 1741 ====
1741 is a super-prime and a centered square number.

==== 1747 ====
1747 is a balanced prime.

==== 1750 ====
1750 = 2 × 5^{3} × 7. It is the hypotenuse of three different Pythagorean triangles with integer side lengths.

==== 1753 ====
1753 is a balanced prime.

==== 1756 ====
1756 = 2^{2} × 439. It is a centered pentagonal number.

==== 1757 ====
1757 = 7 × 251. Completing 13 revolutions around the Spiral of Theodorus requires 1757 triangles.

==== 1759 ====
1759 is a de Polignac prime.

==== 1765 ====
1765 = 5 × 353. There are 1765 planar partitions of 15.

==== 1769 ====
1769 = 29 × 61. A maximum of 1769 pieces can be obtained by cutting an annulus with 58 times.

==== 1770 ====
1770 = 2 × 3 × 59. It is the 59th triangular number and a hexagonal number.

==== 1771 ====
1771 = 7 × 11 × 23. It is a tetrahedral number.

==== 1772 ====
1772 = 2^{2} × 443. It is a centered heptagonal number and the sum of the totient function for the first 76 integers.

==== 1776 ====
1776 = 2^{4} × 3 × 37. It is the 24th square star number. A total of 1776 pieces could be seen in a 7 × 7 × 7 × 7 Rubik's Tesseract.

==== 1782 ====
1782 = 2 × 3^{4} × 11. It is a heptagonal number.

==== 1783 ====
1783 is a de Polignac prime.

==== 1785 ====
1785 = 3 × 5 × 7 × 17. It is a square pyramidal number.

==== 1786 ====
1786 = 2 × 19 × 47. It is a centered triangular number.

==== 1787 ====
1787 is a super-prime. It is the sum of eleven consecutive primes: 1787 = 137 + 139 + 149 + 151 + 157 + 163 + 167 + 173 + 179 + 181 + 191.

==== 1792 ====
1792 = 2^{8} × 7. It is a Granville number.

==== 1794 ====
1794 = 2 × 3 × 13 × 23. It is a nonagonal number.

=== 1800 to 1899 ===
==== 1801 ====
1801 is a cuban prime. It is the sum of five consecutive primes (349 + 353 + 359 + 367 + 373) and nine consecutive primes 179 + 181 + 191 + 193 + 197 + 199 + 211 + 223 + 227).

==== 1806 ====
1806 = 2 × 3 × 301. It is a pronic number, a primary pseudoperfect number, and a Schröder number. It is the only number n such that the denominator of the nth Bernoulli number is n.

==== 1807 ====
1807 = 13 × 139. It is the fifth term of Sylvester's sequence.

==== 1811 ====
1811 is a Sophie Germain prime.

==== 1820 ====
1820 = 2^{2} × 5 × 7 × 13. It is a pentagonal number and a pentatope number.

==== 1821 ====
1821 = 3 × 607. It is a member of the Mian–Chowla sequence.

==== 1823 ====
1823 is a super-prime and a safe prime.

==== 1825 ====
1825 = 5^{2} × 73. It is an octagonal number.

==== 1827 ====
1827 = 3^{2} × 7 × 29. It is a vampire number.

==== 1828 ====
1828 = 2^{2} × 457. It is a meandric number as well as an open meandric number. 1828 appears two times on Euler's number:

2.7182818284590

Because of this repeating pattern, Gene Widhoff quoted the following statement:

It enables a numskull to memorize a quantity of numerals.

Some mathematicians think of 1828 as the birth year of the Russian author named Leo Tolstoy.

==== 1829 ====
1829 = 31 × 59. composite de Polignac number.

==== 1830 ====
1830 = 2 × 3 × 5 × 61. It is the 60th triangular number.

==== 1831 ====
1831 is the smallest prime number with a gap of exactly 16 to the next prime, 1847.

==== 1834 ====
1834 = 2 × 7 × 131. It is an octahedral number.

==== 1837 ====
1837 = 11 × 167. It is a star number.

==== 1841 ====
1841 = 7 × 263. It is the solution to the postage stamp problem with 3 denominations and 29 stamps.

==== 1847 ====
1847 is a super-prime.

==== 1859 ====
1859 = 11 × 13^{2}. It is a composite de Polignac number.

==== 1861 ====
1861 is a prime number and a centered square number.

==== 1862 and 1863 ====
1862 and 1863 form a Ruth–Aaron pair under the second definition.

==== 1867 ====
1867 is a prime de Polignac number.

==== 1870 ====
1870 = 2 × 5 × 11 × 17. It is a decagonal number.

==== 1871, 1873, 1877, and 1879 ====
1871, 1873, 1877, and 1879 form a prime quadruple.

There are 1873 Narayana's cows and calves after 21 years.

==== 1880 ====
1880 = 2^{3} × 5 × 47. It is the 10th element of the self convolution of Lucas numbers.

==== 1882 ====
1882 = 2 × 941. There are 1882 linearly separable Boolean functions in 4 variables.

==== 1885 ====
1885 = 5 × 13 × 29. There are 1885 series-reduced planted trees with 17 vertices, and 1885 non-isomorphic T_{0}-covers of 4 vertices by distinct sets 1885 is a Quasi–Carmichael number, and possibly the only number whose preceding number, 1886, is also a Quasi–Carmichael number. 1885 is a Zeisel number, and the first Zeisel number to be found by Helmut Zeisel himself.

==== 1889 ====
1889 is a Sophie Germain prime and a highly cototient number.

==== 1891 ====
1891 = 31 × 61. It is the 61st triangular number, a centered triangular number a hexagonal number, a centered pentagonal number, and the sum of 5 consecutive primes: 1891 = 367 + 373 + 379 + 383 + 389.

==== 1892 ====
1892 = 2^{2} × 11 × 43. It is a pronic number.

==== 1896 ====
1896 = 2^{3} × 3 × 79. It is a member of the Mian-Chowla sequence.

==== 1897 ====
1897 = 7 × 271. It is a member of the Padovan sequence.

=== 1900 to 1999 ===
==== 1900 ====
1900 is the third largest number whose Roman numeral is a palindrome.

==== 1901 ====
1901 is a Sophie Germain prime and a centered decagonal number.

==== 1905 ====
1905 = 3 × 5 × 127. It is a Fermat pseudoprime.

==== 1907 ====
1907 is a safe prime and a balanced prime.

==== 1909 ====
1909 = 23 × 83. It is a hyperperfect number.

==== 1913 ====
1913 is a super-prime.

==== 1918 ====
1918 = 2 × 7 × 137. It is a heptagonal number.

==== 1926 ====
1926 = 2 × 3^{2} × 107. It is a pentagonal number.

==== 1931 ====
1931 is a Sophie Germain prime.

==== 1933 ====
1933 is a prime number and a centered heptagonal number.

==== 1951 ====
1951 is a cuban prime.

==== 1953 ====
1953 = 3^{2} × 7 × 31. It is the 62nd triangular number.

==== 1956 ====
1956 = 2^{2} × 3 × 163. It is a nonagonal number.

==== 1969 ====
1969 = 11 × 179. It is the only number less than four million for which a "mod-ification" of the standard Ackermann Function does not stabilize

==== 1973 ====
1973 is a Sophie Germain prime and a Leonardo prime.

==== 1976 ====
1976 = 2^{3} × 13 × 19. It is an octagonal number.

==== 1980 ====
1980 = 2^{2} × 3^{2} × 5 × 11. It is a pronic number and a highly abundant number, and it also has a greater aliquot sum than any smaller number.

==== 1985 ====
1985 = 5 × 397. It is a centered square number.

==== 1987 ====
1987 is the first number of a sexy prime triplet (1987, 1993, 1999). It is a lucky number and therefore also a lucky prime.

==== 1990 ====
1990 = 2 × 5 × 199. It is a Stella octangula number.

==== 1993 ====
1993 forms a prime triplet with 1987 and 1999.

==== 1999 ====
1999 is a prime number that forms a prime triplet with 1987 and 1993. It is also a centered triangular number. There are 1999 regular forms in a myriagram.

=== Prime numbers ===
There are 135 prime numbers between 1000 and 2000:

1009, 1013, 1019, 1021, 1031, 1033, 1039, 1049, 1051, 1061, 1063, 1069, 1087, 1091, 1093, 1097, 1103, 1109, 1117, 1123, 1129, 1151, 1153, 1163, 1171, 1181, 1187, 1193, 1201, 1213, 1217, 1223, 1229, 1231, 1237, 1249, 1259, 1277, 1279, 1283, 1289, 1291, 1297, 1301, 1303, 1307, 1319, 1321, 1327, 1361, 1367, 1373, 1381, 1399, 1409, 1423, 1427, 1429, 1433, 1439, 1447, 1451, 1453, 1459, 1471, 1481, 1483, 1487, 1489, 1493, 1499, 1511, 1523, 1531, 1543, 1549, 1553, 1559, 1567, 1571, 1579, 1583, 1597, 1601, 1607, 1609, 1613, 1619, 1621, 1627, 1637, 1657, 1663, 1667, 1669, 1693, 1697, 1699, 1709, 1721, 1723, 1733, 1741, 1747, 1753, 1759, 1777, 1783, 1787, 1789, 1801, 1811, 1823, 1831, 1847, 1861, 1867, 1871, 1873, 1877, 1879, 1889, 1901, 1907, 1913, 1931, 1933, 1949, 1951, 1973, 1979, 1987, 1993, 1997, 1999
