= 7000 (number) =

← 6999	7000	7001 →
- List of numbers; Integers; ← 0 1k 2k 3k 4k 5k 6k 7k 8k 9k →
- Cardinal: seven thousand
- Ordinal: 7000th (seven thousandth)
- Factorization: 2^{3} × 5^{3} × 7
- Greek numeral: ,Ζ´
- Roman numeral: V̅MM, or V̅I̅I̅
- Unicode symbol(s): V̅MM, v̅mm, V̅I̅I̅, v̅i̅i̅
- Binary: 1101101011000_{2}
- Ternary: 100121021_{3}
- Senary: 52224_{6}
- Octal: 15530_{8}
- Duodecimal: 4074_{12}
- Hexadecimal: 1B58_{16}
- Armenian: Ւ

7000 (seven thousand) is the natural number following 6999 and preceding 7001.

== Selected numbers in the range 7001–7999 ==
=== 7001 to 7099 ===
- 7021 – triangular number
- 7043 – Sophie Germain prime
- 7057 – cuban prime of the form x = y + 1, super-prime
- 7073 – Leyland number
- 7079 – Sophie Germain prime, safe prime

=== 7100 to 7199 ===
- 7103 – Sophie Germain prime, sexy prime with 7109
- 7106 – octahedral number
- 7109 – super-prime, sexy prime with 7103
- 7121 – Sophie Germain prime
- 7140 – triangular number, also a pronic number, tetrahedral number
- 7141 – sum of the first 58 primes, star number
- 7151 – Sophie Germain prime
- 7187 – safe prime
- 7192 – weird number
- 7193 – Sophie Germain prime, super-prime

=== 7200 to 7299 ===
- 7200 – pentagonal pyramidal number
- 7211 – Sophie Germain prime
- 7225 = 85^{2}, centered octagonal number
- 7230 = 36^{2} + 37^{2} + 38^{2} + 39^{2} + 40^{2} = 41^{2} + 42^{2} + 43^{2} + 44^{2}
- 7246 – centered heptagonal number
- 7247 – safe prime
- 7260 – triangular number
- 7267 – decagonal number
- 7272 – Kaprekar number
- 7283 – super-prime
- 7291 – nonagonal number

=== 7300 to 7399 ===
- 7310 – pronic number
- 7316 – number of 18-bead binary necklaces with beads of 2 colors where the colors may be swapped but turning over is not allowed
- 7338 – Fine number.
- 7349 – Sophie Germain prime
- 7351 – super-prime, cuban prime of the form x = y + 1
- 7381 – triangular number
- 7385 – Keith number

=== 7400 to 7499 ===
- 7417 – super-prime
- 7418 – sum of the first 59 primes
- 7433 – Sophie Germain prime
- 7471 – centered cube number
- 7481 – super-prime, cousin prime
- 7482 – pronic number

=== 7500 to 7599 ===
- 7503 – triangular number
- 7523 – balanced prime, safe prime, super-prime
- 7541 – Sophie Germain prime
- 7559 – safe prime
- 7560 – the 20th highly composite number
- 7561 – Markov prime, star prime
- 7568 – centered heptagonal number
- 7569 = 87^{2}, centered octagonal number
- 7583 – balanced prime

=== 7600 to 7699 ===
- 7607 – safe prime, super-prime
- 7612 – decagonal number
- 7614 – nonagonal number
- 7626 – triangular number
- 7643 – Sophie Germain prime, safe prime
- 7647 – Keith number
- 7649 – Sophie Germain prime, super-prime
- 7656 – pronic number
- 7691 – Sophie Germain prime
- 7699 – super-prime, emirp, sum of the first 60 primes, first prime above 281 to be the sum of the first k primes for some k

=== 7700 to 7799 ===
- 7703 – safe prime
- 7714 – square pyramidal number
- 7727 – safe prime
- 7739 – member of the Padovan sequence
- 7741 = number of trees with 15 unlabeled nodes
- 7744 = 88^{2}, square palindrome not ending in 0
- 7750 – triangular number
- 7753 – super-prime
- 7770 – tetrahedral number
- 7777 – Kaprekar number, repdigit

=== 7800 to 7899 ===
- 7823 – Sophie Germain prime, safe prime, balanced prime
- 7825 – magic constant of n × n normal magic square and n-Queens Problem for n = 25. Also the first counterexample in the Boolean Pythagorean triples problem.
- 7832 – pronic number
- 7841 – Sophie Germain prime, balanced prime, super-prime
- 7875 – triangular number
- 7883 – Sophie Germain prime, super-prime
- 7897 – centered heptagonal number

=== 7900 to 7999 ===
- 7901 – Sophie Germain prime
- 7909 – Keith number
- 7912 – weird number
- 7919 – 1000th prime number
- 7920 – the order of the Mathieu group M_{11}, the smallest sporadic simple group
- 7921 = 89^{2}, centered octagonal number
- 7944 – nonagonal number
- 7957 – super-Poulet number
- 7965 – decagonal number
- 7979 – highly cototient number
- 7982 – sum of the first 61 primes
- 7993 – star prime, reverse superstar prime

=== Prime numbers ===
There are 107 prime numbers between 7000 and 8000:

7001, 7013, 7019, 7027, 7039, 7043, 7057, 7069, 7079, 7103, 7109, 7121, 7127, 7129, 7151, 7159, 7177, 7187, 7193, 7207, 7211, 7213, 7219, 7229, 7237, 7243, 7247, 7253, 7283, 7297, 7307, 7309, 7321, 7331, 7333, 7349, 7351, 7369, 7393, 7411, 7417, 7433, 7451, 7457, 7459, 7477, 7481, 7487, 7489, 7499, 7507, 7517, 7523, 7529, 7537, 7541, 7547, 7549, 7559, 7561, 7573, 7577, 7583, 7589, 7591, 7603, 7607, 7621, 7639, 7643, 7649, 7669, 7673, 7681, 7687, 7691, 7699, 7703, 7717, 7723, 7727, 7741, 7753, 7757, 7759, 7789, 7793, 7817, 7823, 7829, 7841, 7853, 7867, 7873, 7877, 7879, 7883, 7901, 7907, 7919, 7927, 7933, 7937, 7949, 7951, 7963, 7993
