= 3000 (number) =

← 2999	3000	3001 →
- List of numbers; Integers; ← 0 1k 2k 3k 4k 5k 6k 7k 8k 9k →
- Cardinal: three thousand
- Ordinal: 3000th (three thousandth)
- Factorization: 2^{3} × 3 × 5^{3}
- Greek numeral: ,Γ´
- Roman numeral: MMM, mmm
- Unicode symbol(s): MMM, mmm
- Binary: 101110111000_{2}
- Ternary: 11010010_{3}
- Senary: 21520_{6}
- Octal: 5670_{8}
- Duodecimal: 18A0_{12}
- Hexadecimal: BB8_{16}
- Armenian: Վ
- Egyptian hieroglyph: 𓆾

3000 (three thousand) is the natural number following 2999 and preceding 3001. It is the smallest number requiring thirteen letters in English (when "and" is required from 101 forward).

== Selected numbers in the range 3001–3999 ==
=== 3001 to 3099 ===
- 3001 – super-prime; divides the Euclid number 2999# + 1
- 3003 – triangular number, only number known to appear eight times in Pascal's triangle; no number is known to appear more than eight times other than 1. (see Singmaster's conjecture)
- 3019 – super-prime, happy prime
- 3023 – 84th Sophie Germain prime, 51st safe prime
- 3025 = 55^{2}, sum of the cubes of the first ten integers, centered octagonal number, dodecagonal number
- 3037 – star number, cousin prime with 3041
- 3046 – centered heptagonal number
- 3052 – decagonal number
- 3059 – centered cube number
- 3063 – perfect totient number
- 3067 – super-prime
- 3071 – Thabit number
- 3075 – nonagonal number
- 3080 – pronic number
- 3081 – triangular number, 497th sphenic number
- 3087 – sum of first 40 primes

=== 3100 to 3199 ===
- 3109 – super-prime
- 3119 – safe prime
- 3121 – centered square number, emirp, largest minimal prime in quinary.
- 3136 = 56^{2}, palindromic in ternary (11022011_{3}), tribonacci number
- 3137 – Proth prime, both a left- and right-truncatable prime
- 3141 – The number "3141" has a total of 3 prime factors and 6 positive divisors, it is also the first four digits of pi
- 3149 – highly cototient number
- 3155 – member of the Mian–Chowla sequence
- 3159 = number of trees with 14 unlabeled nodes
- 3160 – triangular number
- 3167 – safe prime
- 3169 – super-prime, Cuban prime of the form $x=y+1$.
- 3192 – pronic number

=== 3200 to 3299 ===
- 3203 – safe prime
- 3229 – super-prime
- 3240 – triangular number
- 3248 – member of a Ruth-Aaron pair with 3249 under second definition
- 3249 = 57^{2}, palindromic in base 7 (12321_{7}), centered octagonal number, member of a Ruth–Aaron pair with 3248 under second definition
- 3256 – centered heptagonal number
- 3259 – super-prime, completes the ninth prime quadruplet set
- 3264 – solution to Steiner's conic problem: number of smooth conics tangent to 5 given conics in general position
- 3266 – sum of first 41 primes, 523rd sphenic number
- 3276 – tetrahedral number
- 3277 – 5th super-Poulet number, decagonal number
- 3279 – first composite Wieferich number
- 3281 – octahedral number, centered square number
- 3286 – nonagonal number
- 3299 – 85th Sophie Germain prime, super-prime

=== 3300 to 3399 ===
- 3306 – pronic number
- 3307 – balanced prime
- 3313 – balanced prime, star number
- 3319 – super-prime, happy number
- 3321 – triangular number
- 3329 – 86th Sophie Germain prime, Proth prime, member of the Padovan sequence
- 3354 – member of the Mian–Chowla sequence
- 3359 – 87th Sophie Germain prime, highly cototient number
- 3360 – largely composite number
- 3389 – 88th Sophie Germain prime

=== 3400 to 3499 ===
- 3403 – triangular number
- 3407 – super-prime
- 3413 – 89th Sophie Germain prime
- 3435 – a perfect digit-to-digit invariant, equal to the sum of its digits to their own powers (3^{3} + 4^{4} + 3^{3} + 5^{5} = 3435)
- 3439 – magic constant of n×n normal magic square and n-queens problem for n = 19.
- 3445 – centered square number
- 3447 – sum of first 42 primes
- 3449 – 90th Sophie Germain prime
- 3457 – Proth prime
- 3463 – happy number
- 3467 – safe prime
- 3469 – super-prime, Cuban prime of the form x = y + 2, completes the tenth prime quadruplet set
- 3473 – centered heptagonal number
- 3481 = 59^{2}, centered octagonal number
- 3486 – triangular number
- 3491 – 91st Sophie Germain prime

=== 3500 to 3599 ===
- 3504 – nonagonal number
- 3510 – decagonal number
- 3511 – largest known Wieferich prime
- 3512 – number of primes $\leq 2^{15}$.
- 3517 – super-prime, sum of nine consecutive primes (367 + 373 + 379 + 383 + 389 + 397 + 401 + 409 + 419)
- 3539 – 92nd Sophie Germain prime
- 3540 – pronic number
- 3559 – super-prime
- 3569 – highly cototient number
- 3570 – triangular number
- 3571 – 500th prime, Cuban prime of the form x = y + 1, 17th Lucas number, 4th balanced prime of order 4.
- 3591 – member of the Mian–Chowla sequence
- 3593 – 93rd Sophie Germain prime, super-prime

=== 3600 to 3699 ===
- 3600 = 60^{2}, number of seconds in an hour, called šār or šāru in the sexagesimal system of Ancient Mesopotamia (cf. Saros),
- 3601 – star number
- 3613 – centered square number
- 3623 – 94th Sophie Germain prime, safe prime
- 3637 – balanced prime, super-prime
- 3638 – sum of first 43 primes, 599th sphenic number
- 3643 – happy number, sum of seven consecutive primes (499 + 503 + 509 + 521 + 523 + 541 + 547)
- 3654 – tetrahedral number
- 3655 – triangular number, 601st sphenic number
- 3660 – pronic number
- 3684 – 13th Keith number
- 3697 – centered heptagonal number

=== 3700 to 3799 ===
- 3721 = 61^{2}, centered octagonal number
- 3729 – nonagonal number
- 3733 – balanced prime, super-prime
- 3741 – triangular number, 618th sphenic number
- 3751 – decagonal number
- 3761 – 95th Sophie Germain prime, super-prime
- 3779 – 96th Sophie Germain prime, safe prime
- 3780 – largely composite number
- 3782 – pronic number, 623rd sphenic number
- 3785 – centered square number
- 3797 – member of the Mian–Chowla sequence, both a left- and right- truncatable prime

=== 3800 to 3899 ===
- 3803 – 97th Sophie Germain prime, safe prime,
- 3821 – 98th Sophie Germain prime
- 3828 – triangular number
- 3831 – sum of first 44 primes
- 3851 – 99th Sophie Germain prime
- 3856 – number of 17-bead binary necklaces with beads of 2 colors where the colors may be swapped but turning over is not allowed
- 3863 – 100th Sophie Germain prime
- 3865 – greater of third pair of Smith brothers
- 3888 – longest number when expressed in Roman numerals I, V, X, L, C, D, and M (MMMDCCCLXXXVIII), 3-smooth number (2^{4}×3^{5})
- 3889 – Cuban prime of the form x = y + 2
- 3894 – octahedral number

=== 3900 to 3999 ===
- 3901 – star number
- 3911 – 101st Sophie Germain prime, super-prime
- 3914 – number of 18-bead necklaces (turning over is allowed) where complements are equivalent
- 3916 – triangular number
- 3925 – centered cube number
- 3926 – 12th open meandric number, 654th sphenic number
- 3928 – centered heptagonal number
- 3937 – product of distinct Mersenne primes, repeated sum of divisors is prime, denominator of conversion factor from meter to US survey foot
- 3940 – there are 3940 distinct ways to arrange the 12 flat pentacubes (or 3-D pentominoes) into a 3x4x5 box (not counting rotations and reflections)
- 3943 – super-prime
- 3947 – safe prime
- 3960 – largely composite number
- 3961 – nonagonal number, centered square number
- 3969 = 63^{2}, centered octagonal number
- 3989 – highly cototient number
- 3998 – member of the Mian–Chowla sequence
- 3999 – largest number properly expressible using Roman numerals I, V, X, L, C, D, and M (MMMCMXCIX), ignoring vinculum

=== Prime numbers ===
There are 120 prime numbers between 3000 and 4000:

3001, 3011, 3019, 3023, 3037, 3041, 3049, 3061, 3067, 3079, 3083, 3089, 3109, 3119, 3121, 3137, 3163, 3167, 3169, 3181, 3187, 3191, 3203, 3209, 3217, 3221, 3229, 3251, 3253, 3257, 3259, 3271, 3299, 3301, 3307, 3313, 3319, 3323, 3329, 3331, 3343, 3347, 3359, 3361, 3371, 3373, 3389, 3391, 3407, 3413, 3433, 3449, 3457, 3461, 3463, 3467, 3469, 3491, 3499, 3511, 3517, 3527, 3529, 3533, 3539, 3541, 3547, 3557, 3559, 3571, 3581, 3583, 3593, 3607, 3613, 3617, 3623, 3631, 3637, 3643, 3659, 3671, 3673, 3677, 3691, 3697, 3701, 3709, 3719, 3727, 3733, 3739, 3761, 3767, 3769, 3779, 3793, 3797, 3803, 3821, 3823, 3833, 3847, 3851, 3853, 3863, 3877, 3881, 3889, 3907, 3911, 3917, 3919, 3923, 3929, 3931, 3943, 3947, 3967, 3989
