= 8000 (number) =

← 7999	8000	8001 →
- List of numbers; Integers; ← 0 1k 2k 3k 4k 5k 6k 7k 8k 9k →
- Cardinal: eight thousand
- Ordinal: 8000th (eight thousandth)
- Factorization: 2^{6} × 5^{3}
- Greek numeral: ,Η´
- Roman numeral: V̅MMM, or V̅I̅I̅I̅
- Unicode symbol(s): V̅MMM, v̅mmm, V̅I̅I̅I̅, v̅i̅i̅i̅
- Binary: 1111101000000_{2}
- Ternary: 101222022_{3}
- Senary: 101012_{6}
- Octal: 17500_{8}
- Duodecimal: 4768_{12}
- Hexadecimal: 1F40_{16}
- Armenian: Փ

8000 (eight thousand) is the natural number following 7999 and preceding 8001.

8000 is the cube of 20, as well as the sum of four consecutive integers cubed, 11^{3} + 12^{3} + 13^{3} + 14^{3}.

The fourteen tallest mountains on Earth, which exceed 8000 meters in height, are sometimes referred to as eight-thousanders.

== Selected numbers in the range 8001–8999 ==
=== 8001 to 8099 ===
- 8001 – triangular number
- 8011 – super-prime
- 8039 – safe prime, only known generalized Wieferich prime base 39
- 8059 – super-prime
- 8069 – Sophie Germain prime
- 8093 – Sophie Germain prime

=== 8100 to 8199 ===
- 8101 – super-prime
- 8111 – Sophie Germain prime
- 8117 – super-prime, balanced prime
- 8119 – octahedral number; 8119/5741 ≈ √2
- 8125 – pentagonal pyramidal number
- 8128 – perfect number, harmonic divisor number, 127th triangular number, 64th hexagonal number, eighth 292-gonal number, fourth 1356-gonal number
- 8147 – safe prime
- 8189 – highly cototient number
- 8190 – harmonic divisor number
- 8191 – Mersenne prime
- 8192 = 2^{13}

=== 8200 to 8299 ===
- 8208 – base 10 narcissistic number as 8^{4} + 2^{4} + 0^{4} + 8^{4} = 8208
- 8219 – twin prime with 8221
- 8221 – super-prime, twin prime with 8219
- 8233 – super-prime, centered heptagonal number
- 8243 – Sophie Germain prime
- 8256 – triangular number
- 8257 – sum of the squares of the first fourteen primes
- 8269 – cuban prime of the form x = y + 1
- 8273 – Sophie Germain prime
- 8281 = 91^{2}, sum of the cubes of the first thirteen integers, nonagonal number, centered octagonal number
- 8287 – super-prime

=== 8300 to 8399 ===
- 8321 – super-Poulet number
- 8326 – decagonal number
- 8345 – smallest pandigital number in base 6
- 8361 – Leyland number
- 8377 – super-prime
- 8385 – triangular number
- 8389 – super-prime, twin prime

=== 8400 to 8499 ===
- 8423 – safe prime
- 8436 – tetrahedral number
- 8437 – star number

=== 8500 to 8599 ===
- 8513 – Sophie Germain prime, super-prime
- 8515 – triangular number
- 8521 – sexy prime with 8527
- 8527 – super-prime, sexy prime with 8521
- 8543 – safe prime
- 8555 – square pyramidal number
- 8558 – Large Schröder number
- 8576 – centered heptagonal number
- 8581 – super-prime

=== 8600 to 8699 ===
- 8625 – nonagonal number
- 8646 – triangular number
- 8649 = 93^{2}, centered octagonal number
- 8663 – Sophie Germain prime
- 8693 – Sophie Germain prime
- 8695 – decagonal number
- 8699 – safe prime

=== 8700 to 8799 ===
- 8712 – smallest number that is divisible by its reverse: 8712 = 4 × 2178 (excluding palindromes and numbers with trailing zeros)
- 8713 – balanced prime
- 8719 – super-prime
- 8741 – Sophie Germain prime
- 8747 – safe prime, balanced prime, super-prime
- 8751 – perfect totient number
- 8760 - number of hours in a common year.
- 8761 – super-prime
- 8778 – triangular number
- 8783 – safe prime

=== 8800 to 8899 ===
- 8801 – magic constant of n × n normal magic square and n-Queens Problem for n = 26.
- 8807 – super-prime, sum of eleven consecutive primes (761 + 769 + 773 + 787 + 797 + 809 + 811 + 821 + 823 + 827 + 829)
- 8819 – safe prime
- 8849 – super-prime
- 8855 – member of a Ruth-Aaron pair (first definition) with 8856
- 8856 – member of a Ruth-Aaron pair (first definition) with 8855
- 8893 – star prime

=== 8900 to 8999 ===
- 8911 – Carmichael number, triangular number
- 8923 – super-prime
- 8926 – centered heptagonal number
- 8951 – Sophie Germain prime
- 8963 – safe Prime prime
- 8969 – Sophie Germain prime
- 8976 – enneagonal number
- 8999 – super-prime

=== Prime numbers ===
There are 110 prime numbers between 8000 and 9000:

8009, 8011, 8017, 8039, 8053, 8059, 8069, 8081, 8087, 8089, 8093, 8101, 8111, 8117, 8123, 8147, 8161, 8167, 8171, 8179, 8191, 8209, 8219, 8221, 8231, 8233, 8237, 8243, 8263, 8269, 8273, 8287, 8291, 8293, 8297, 8311, 8317, 8329, 8353, 8363, 8369, 8377, 8387, 8389, 8419, 8423, 8429, 8431, 8443, 8447, 8461, 8467, 8501, 8513, 8521, 8527, 8537, 8539, 8543, 8563, 8573, 8581, 8597, 8599, 8609, 8623, 8627, 8629, 8641, 8647, 8663, 8669, 8677, 8681, 8689, 8693, 8699, 8707, 8713, 8719, 8731, 8737, 8741, 8747, 8753, 8761, 8779, 8783, 8803, 8807, 8819, 8821, 8831, 8837, 8839, 8849, 8861, 8863, 8867, 8887, 8893, 8923, 8929, 8933, 8941, 8951, 8963, 8969, 8971, 8999
