= 4000 (number) =

← 3999	4000	4001 →
- List of numbers; Integers; ← 0 1k 2k 3k 4k 5k 6k 7k 8k 9k →
- Cardinal: four thousand
- Ordinal: 4000th (four thousandth)
- Factorization: 2^{5} × 5^{3}
- Divisors: 1, 2, 4, 5, 8, 10, 16, 20, 25, 32, 40, 50, 80, 100, 125, 160, 200, 250, 400, 500, 800, 1000, 2000, 4000
- Greek numeral: ,Δ´
- Roman numeral: MV̅, or I̅V̅
- Unicode symbol(s): MV̅, mv̅, I̅V̅, i̅v̅
- Binary: 111110100000_{2}
- Ternary: 12111011_{3}
- Senary: 30304_{6}
- Octal: 7640_{8}
- Duodecimal: 2394_{12}
- Hexadecimal: FA0_{16}
- Armenian: Տ
- Egyptian hieroglyph: 𓆿

4000 (four thousand) is the natural number following 3999 and preceding 4001.

== In mathematics ==
4000 is a regular number, and a decagonal number.

== Selected numbers in the range 4001–4999 ==
=== 4001 to 4099 ===
- 4005 – triangular number
- 4007 – safe prime
- 4010 – magic constant of n × n normal magic square and n-queens problem for n = 20
- 4013 – balanced prime
- 4019 – Sophie Germain prime
- 4027 – super-prime
- 4028 – sum of the first 45 primes
- 4030 – third weird number
- 4032 – pronic number
- 4033 – sixth super-Poulet number; strong pseudoprime in base 2
- 4060 – tetrahedral number
- 4073 – Sophie Germain prime
- 4079 – safe prime
- 4091 – super-prime
- 4095 – triangular number and odd abundant number; number of divisors in the sum of the fifth and largest known unitary perfect number, largest Ramanujan–Nagell number of the form $2^{n} - 1$
- 4096 = 64^{2} = 16^{3} = 8^{4} = 4^{6} = 2^{12}, smallest number with exactly 13 factors, a superperfect number
- 4098 – the fifth maximum-score busy beaver number

=== 4100 to 4199 ===
- 4104 = 2^{3} + 16^{3} = 9^{3} + 15^{3}
- 4127 – safe prime
- 4133 – super-prime
- 4139 – safe prime
- 4140 – Bell number
- 4141 – centered square number
- 4147 – smallest cyclic number in duodecimal represented in base-12 notation as 2497_{12}
  2×4147_{dez} = 4972_{12}
  3×4147_{dez} = 7249_{12}
  4×4147_{dez} = 9724_{12}
- 4153 – super-prime
- 4160 – pronic number
- 4166 – centered heptagonal number
- 4167 = 7! − 6! − 5! − 4! − 3! − 2! − 1!, number of planar partitions of 14
- 4169 – a number of points of norm <= 10 in cubic lattice
- 4181 – Fibonacci number, Markov number
- 4186 – triangular number
- 4187 – factor of R_{13}, the record number of wickets taken in first-class cricket by Wilfred Rhodes
- 4199 – highly cototient number, product of three consecutive primes

=== 4200 to 4299 ===
- 4200 – nonagonal number, pentagonal pyramidal number, largely composite number
- 4210 – 11th semi-meandric number
- 4211 – Sophie Germain prime
- 4213 – Riordan number
- 4217 – super-prime, happy number
- 4219 – cuban prime of the form x = y + 1, centered hexagonal number
- 4225 = 65^{2}, centered octagonal number
- 4227 – sum of the first 46 primes
- 4240 – Leyland number
- 4257 – decagonal number
- 4259 – safe prime
- 4271 – Sophie Germain prime
- 4273 – super-prime, number of non-isomorphic set-systems of weight 11
- 4278 – triangular number
- 4279 – little Schroeder number
- 4283 – safe prime
- 4289 – highly cototient number
- 4290 – pronic number

=== 4300 to 4399 ===
- 4320 – largely composite number
- 4324 – 23rd square pyramidal number
- 4325 – centered square number
- 4339 – super-prime, twin prime
- 4349 – Sophie Germain prime
- 4351 – Normalized total height of all rooted trees on 6 labeled nodes
- 4356 = 66^{2}, sum of the cubes of the first eleven integers
- 4359 – perfect totient number
- 4369 – seventh super-Poulet number
- 4371 – triangular number
- 4373 – Sophie Germain prime
- 4374 – The largest number such that both it and the next number (4375) are 7-smooth
- 4375 – perfect totient number (the smallest not divisible by 3)
- 4391 – Sophie Germain prime
- 4397 – super-prime

=== 4400 to 4499 ===
- 4409 – Sophie Germain prime, highly cototient number, balanced prime, 600th prime number
- 4410 – member of the Padovan sequence
- 4411 – centered heptagonal number
- 4421 – super-prime, alternating factorial
- 4422 – pronic number
- 4425 = 1^{5} + 2^{5} + 3^{5} + 4^{5} + 5^{5}
- 4438 – sum of the first 47 primes
- 4446 – nonagonal number
- 4447 – cuban prime of the form x = y + 1
- 4457 – balanced prime
- 4463 – super-prime
- 4465 – triangular number
- 4481 – Sophie Germain prime
- 4489 = 67^{2}, centered octagonal number
- 4495 – tetrahedral number

=== 4500 to 4599 ===
- 4503 – largest number not the sum of four or fewer squares of composites
- 4513 – centered square number
- 4516 – centered pentagonal number
- 4517 – super-prime, happy number
- 4522 – decagonal number
- 4547 – safe prime
- 4549 – super-prime
- 4556 – pronic number
- 4560 – triangular number
- 4567 – super-prime
- 4579 – octahedral number
- 4597 – balanced prime

=== 4600 to 4699 ===
- 4607 – Woodall number
- 4619 – highly cototient number
- 4620 – largely composite number
- 4641 – magic constant of n × n normal magic square and n-queens problem for n = 21
- 4655 – number of free decominoes
- 4656 – triangular number
- 4657 – balanced prime
- 4661 – sum of the first 48 primes
- 4663 – super-prime, centered heptagonal number
- 4679 – safe prime
- 4680 – largely composite number
- 4681 – eighth super-Poulet number
- 4688 – 2-automorphic number
- 4689 – sum of divisors and number of divisors are both triangular numbers
- 4691 – balanced prime
- 4692 – pronic number
- 4699 – nonagonal number

=== 4700 to 4799 ===
- 4703 – safe prime
- 4705 = 48^{2} + 49^{2} = 17^{2} + 18^{2} + ... + 26^{2}, centered square number
- 4727 – sum of the squares of the first twelve primes
- 4731 – centered pentagonal number
- 4733 – Sophie Germain prime
- 4753 – triangular number
- 4759 – super-prime
- 4761 = 69^{2}, centered octagonal number
- 4769 = number of square (0,1)-matrices without zero rows and with exactly 5 entries equal to 1
- 4782 - year in which the Gregorian calendar will begin to differ from the tropical year by one SI day.
- 4787 – safe prime, super-prime
- 4788 – 14th Keith number
- 4793 – Sophie Germain prime
- 4795 – decagonal number
- 4799 – safe prime

=== 4800 to 4899 ===
- 4801 – super-prime, cuban prime of the form x = y + 2, smallest prime with a composite sum of digits in base 7
- 4830 – pronic number
- 4851 – triangular number, pentagonal pyramidal number
- 4862 – Catalan number
- 4871 – Sophie Germain prime
- 4877 – super-prime
- 4879 – 11th Kaprekar number
- 4888 – sum of the first 49 primes

=== 4900 to 4999 ===
- 4900 = 70^{2}, the only square-pyramidal square other than 1 ()
- 4901 – centered square number
- 4913 - dudeney number
- 4919 – Sophie Germain prime, safe prime
- 4922 – centered heptagonal number
- 4933 – super-prime
- 4941 – centered cube number
- 4943 – Sophie Germain prime, super-prime
- 4950 – triangular number, 12th Kaprekar number
- 4951 – centered pentagonal number
- 4959 – nonagonal number
- 4960 – tetrahedral number; greater of fourth pair of Smith brothers
- 4970 – pronic number
- 4991 – Lucas–Carmichael number
- 4993 – balanced prime

=== Prime numbers ===
There are 119 prime numbers between 4000 and 5000:

4001, 4003, 4007, 4013, 4019, 4021, 4027, 4049, 4051, 4057, 4073, 4079, 4091, 4093, 4099, 4111, 4127, 4129, 4133, 4139, 4153, 4157, 4159, 4177, 4201, 4211, 4217, 4219, 4229, 4231, 4241, 4243, 4253, 4259, 4261, 4271, 4273, 4283, 4289, 4297, 4327, 4337, 4339, 4349, 4357, 4363, 4373, 4391, 4397, 4409, 4421, 4423, 4441, 4447, 4451, 4457, 4463, 4481, 4483, 4493, 4507, 4513, 4517, 4519, 4523, 4547, 4549, 4561, 4567, 4583, 4591, 4597, 4603, 4621, 4637, 4639, 4643, 4649, 4651, 4657, 4663, 4673, 4679, 4691, 4703, 4721, 4723, 4729, 4733, 4751, 4759, 4783, 4787, 4789, 4793, 4799, 4801, 4813, 4817, 4831, 4861, 4871, 4877, 4889, 4903, 4909, 4919, 4931, 4933, 4937, 4943, 4951, 4957, 4967, 4969, 4973, 4987, 4993, 4999
