= 9000 (number) =

← 8999	9000	9001 →
- List of numbers; Integers; ← 0 1k 2k 3k 4k 5k 6k 7k 8k 9k →
- Cardinal: nine thousand
- Ordinal: 9000th (nine thousandth)
- Factorization: 2^{3} × 3^{2} × 5^{3}
- Greek numeral: ,Θ´
- Roman numeral: MX̅, or I̅X̅
- Unicode symbol(s): MX̅, mx̅, I̅X̅, i̅x̅
- Binary: 10001100101000_{2}
- Ternary: 110100100_{3}
- Senary: 105400_{6}
- Octal: 21450_{8}
- Duodecimal: 5260_{12}
- Hexadecimal: 2328_{16}
- Armenian: Ք

9000 (nine thousand) is the natural number following 8999 and preceding 9001.

== Selected numbers in the range 9001–9999 ==
=== 9001 to 9099 ===
- 9001 – sexy prime with 9007
- 9007 – sexy prime with 9001
- 9009 – centered cube number
- 9025 = 95^{2}, centered octagonal number
- 9029 – Sophie Germain prime
- 9041 – super-prime
- 9045 – triangular number
- 9059 – Sophie Germain prime
- 9072 – decagonal number
- 9077 – Markov number
- 9091 – unique prime

=== 9100 to 9199 ===
- 9103 – super-prime
- 9126 – pentagonal pyramidal number
- 9139 – tetrahedral number
- 9175 – smallest (provable) generalized Sierpiński number in base 10: 9175*10^{n}+1 is always divisible by one of the prime numbers {7, 11, 13, 73}.
- 9180 – triangular number

=== 9200 to 9299 ===
- 9221 – Sophie Germain prime
- 9224 – octahedral number
- 9232 – Peak of 27 in Collatz Conjecture.
- 9241 – cuban prime of the form x = y + 1
- 9261 = 21^{3}, largest 4 digit perfect cube
- 9272 – weird number
- 9283 – centered heptagonal number
- 9293 – Sophie Germain prime, super-prime

=== 9300 to 9399 ===
- 9316 – triangular number
- 9319 – super-prime
- 9334 – nonagonal number
- 9349 – Lucas prime, Fibonacci number
- 9361 – star number
- 9371 – Sophie Germain prime
- 9376 – 1-automorphic number
- 9397 – balanced prime

=== 9400 to 9499 ===
- 9403 – super-prime
- 9409 = 97^{2}, centered octagonal number
- 9419 – Sophie Germain prime
- 9439 – completes the twelfth prime quadruplet set
- 9453 – triangular number
- 9455 – square pyramidal number
- 9457 – decagonal number
- 9461 – super-prime, twin prime
- 9467 – safe prime
- 9473 – Sophie Germain prime, balanced prime, Proth prime
- 9474 – Narcissistic number in base 10
- 9479 – Sophie Germain prime
- 9496 – Telephone/involution number

=== 9500 to 9599 ===
- 9539 – Sophie Germain prime, super-prime
- 9551 – first prime followed by as many as 35 consecutive composite numbers
- 9587 – safe prime, follows 35 consecutive composite numbers
- 9591 – triangular number
- 9592 – the number of primes under 100,000

=== 9600 to 9699 ===
- 9601 – Proth prime
- 9619 – super-prime
- 9629 – Sophie Germain prime
- 9647 – centered heptagonal number
- 9661 – super-prime, sum of nine consecutive primes (1049 + 1051 + 1061 + 1063 + 1069 + 1087 + 1091 + 1093 + 1097)
- 9689 – Sophie Germain prime
- 9699 – nonagonal number

=== 9700 to 9799 ===
- 9730 – triangular number
- 9739 – super-prime
- 9743 – safe prime
- 9791 – Sophie Germain prime

=== 9800 to 9899 ===
- 9800 – member of a Ruth-Aaron pair (first definition) with 9801
- 9801 = 99^{2}, the largest 4 digit perfect square, centered octagonal number, square pentagonal number, member of a Ruth-Aaron pair (first definition) with 9800
- 9833 – super-prime
- 9839 – safe prime
- 9841 – star number
- 9850 – decagonal number
- 9855 – magic constant for a 27×27 magic square, probably of numerological significance in Ancient Greece
- 9857 – Proth prime
- 9859 – super-prime
- 9870 – triangular number
- 9871 – balanced prime
- 9880 – tetrahedral number
- 9887 – safe prime

=== 9900 to 9999 ===
- 9901 – unique prime, sum of seven consecutive primes (1381 + 1399 + 1409 + 1423 + 1427 + 1429 + 1433)
- 9905 – number of compositions of 16 whose run-lengths are either weakly increasing or weakly decreasing
- 9923 – super-prime, probably smallest certainly executable prime number on x86 MS-DOS
- 9949 – sum of nine consecutive primes (1087 + 1091 + 1093 + 1097 + 1103 + 1109 + 1117 + 1123 + 1129)
- 9973 – super-prime; largest four-digit prime
- 9988 – number of prime knots with 13 crossings
- 9999 – Kaprekar number, repdigit, largest four-digit number

=== Prime numbers ===
There are 112 prime numbers between 9000 and 10000:

9001, 9007, 9011, 9013, 9029, 9041, 9043, 9049, 9059, 9067, 9091, 9103, 9109, 9127, 9133, 9137, 9151, 9157, 9161, 9173, 9181, 9187, 9199, 9203, 9209, 9221, 9227, 9239, 9241, 9257, 9277, 9281, 9283, 9293, 9311, 9319, 9323, 9337, 9341, 9343, 9349, 9371, 9377, 9391, 9397, 9403, 9413, 9419, 9421, 9431, 9433, 9437, 9439, 9461, 9463, 9467, 9473, 9479, 9491, 9497, 9511, 9521, 9533, 9539, 9547, 9551, 9587, 9601, 9613, 9619, 9623, 9629, 9631, 9643, 9649, 9661, 9677, 9679, 9689, 9697, 9719, 9721, 9733, 9739, 9743, 9749, 9767, 9769, 9781, 9787, 9791, 9803, 9811, 9817, 9829, 9833, 9839, 9851, 9857, 9859, 9871, 9883, 9887, 9901, 9907, 9923, 9929, 9931, 9941, 9949, 9967, 9973
