= 5720 =

5720 may refer to:

- A.D. 5720, a year in the 6th millennium CE
- 5720 BCE, a year in the 6th millennium BC
- 5720, a number in the 5000 (number) range

== Other uses ==
- 5720 Halweaver, a near-Mars asteroid, the 5720th asteroid registered
- Hawaii Route 5720, a state highway
