= 5710 =

5710 may refer to:

- A.D. 5710, a year in the 6th millennium CE
- 5710 BCE, a year in the 6th millennium BC
- 5710, a number in the 5000 (number) range

== Other uses ==
- 5710 Silentium, an asteroid in the Asteroid Belt, the 5710th asteroid registered
- Hawaii Route 5710, a state highway
