= 37 (number) =

← 36	37	38 →
- ← 30 31 32 33 34 35 36 37 38 39 →: List of numbers; Integers; ← 0 10 20 30 40 50 60 70 80 90 →
- Cardinal: thirty-seven
- Ordinal: 37th (thirty-seventh)
- Factorization: prime
- Prime: 12th
- Divisors: 1, 37
- Greek numeral: ΛΖ´
- Roman numeral: XXXVII, xxxvii
- Binary: 100101_{2}
- Ternary: 1101_{3}
- Senary: 101_{6}
- Octal: 45_{8}
- Duodecimal: 31_{12}
- Hexadecimal: 25_{16}

37 (thirty-seven) is the natural number following 36 and preceding 38.

== In mathematics ==
37 is the 12th prime number, and the 3rd isolated prime without a twin prime. 37 is a sexy prime, being 6 more than 31, and 6 less than 43. It is the third cuban prime, the fifth lucky prime, and the fifth Padovan prime, after the first four prime numbers 2, 3, 5, and 7. 37 remains prime when its digits are reversed, thus it is also a permutable prime.

37 is the median value for the second prime factor of an integer.

37 is the first irregular prime with irregularity index of 1, where the smallest prime number with an irregularity index of 2 is the thirty-seventh prime number, 157.

37 is the third star number and the fourth centered hexagonal number.

The sum of the squares of the first 37 primes is divisible by 37. Every positive integer is the sum of at most 37 fifth powers (see Waring's problem).

The smallest magic square, using only primes and 1, contains 37 as the value of its central cell:

31	73	7
13	37	61
67	1	43

Its magic constant is 37 x 3 = 111, where 3 and 37 are the first and third base-ten unique primes (the second such prime is 11).

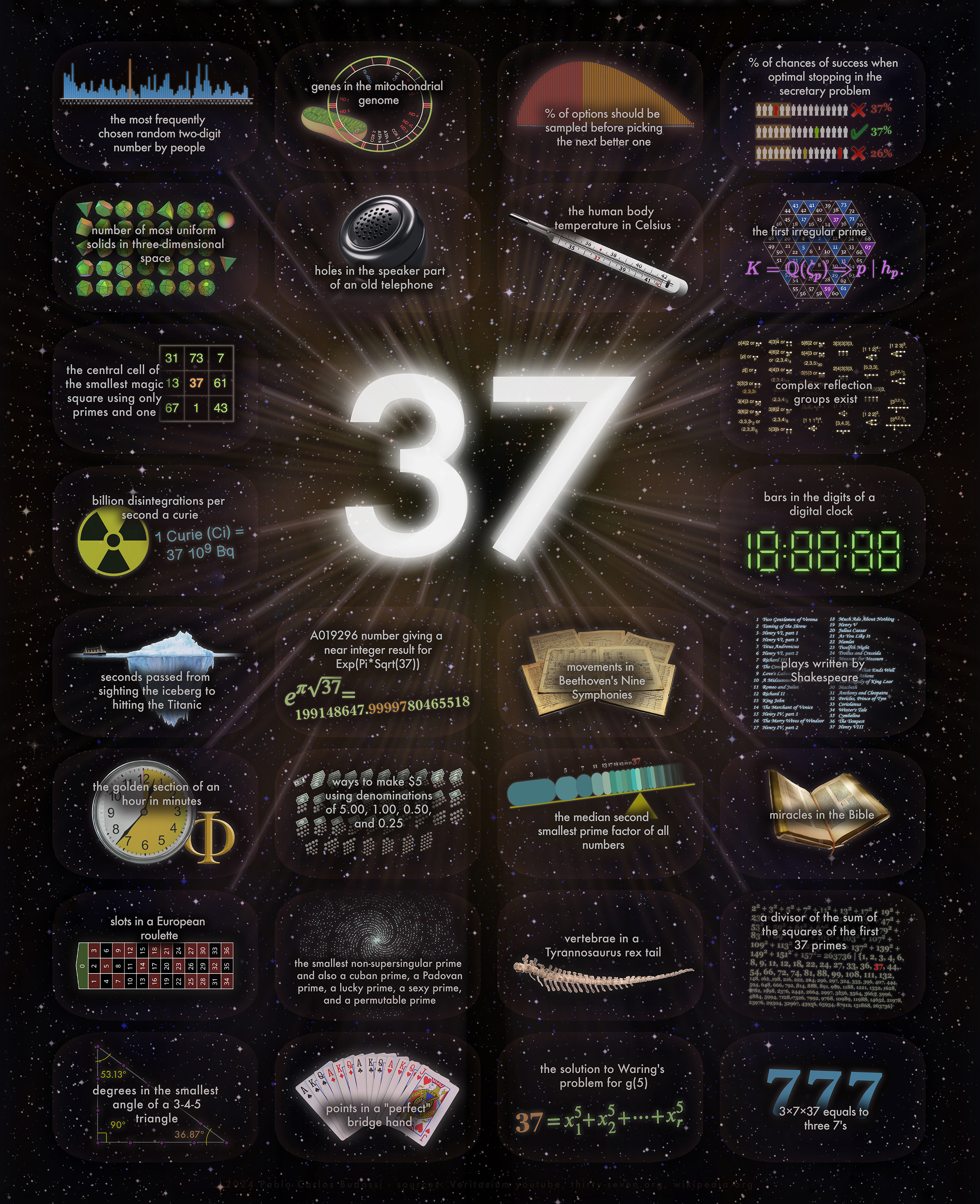
Compilation of contexts in which the number 37 appears, including mathematics, biology, physics, arts, and culture.

37 requires twenty-one steps to return to 1 in the 3x + 1 Collatz problem, as do adjacent numbers 36 and 38. The two closest numbers to cycle through the elementary {16, 8, 4, 2, 1} Collatz pathway are 5 and 32, whose sum is 37.

In moonshine theory, whereas all p ⩾ 73 are non-supersingular primes, the smallest such prime is 37.

37 is the sixth floor of imaginary parts of non-trivial zeroes in the Riemann zeta function. It is in equivalence with the sum of ceilings of the first two such zeroes, 15 and 22.

The secretary problem is also known as the 37% rule by $\tfrac 1e\approx 37\%$.

=== Decimal properties ===
For a three-digit number that is divisible by 37, a rule of divisibility is that another divisible by 37 can be generated by transferring first digit onto the end of a number. For example: 37|148 ➜ 37|481 ➜ 37|814. Any multiple of 37 can be mirrored and spaced with a zero each for another multiple of 37. For example, 37 and 703, 74 and 407, and 518 and 80105 are all multiples of 37; any multiple of 37 with a three-digit repdigit inserted generates another multiple of 37 (for example, 30007, 31117, 74, 70004 and 78884 are all multiples of 37).

Every equal-interval number (e.g. 123, 135, 753) duplicated to a palindrome (e.g. 123321, 753357) renders a multiple of both 11 and 111 (3 × 37 in decimal).

In decimal 37 is a permutable prime with 73, which is the twenty-first prime number. By extension, the mirroring of their digits and prime indexes makes 73 the only Sheldon prime.

=== Geometric properties ===
There are precisely 37 complex reflection groups.

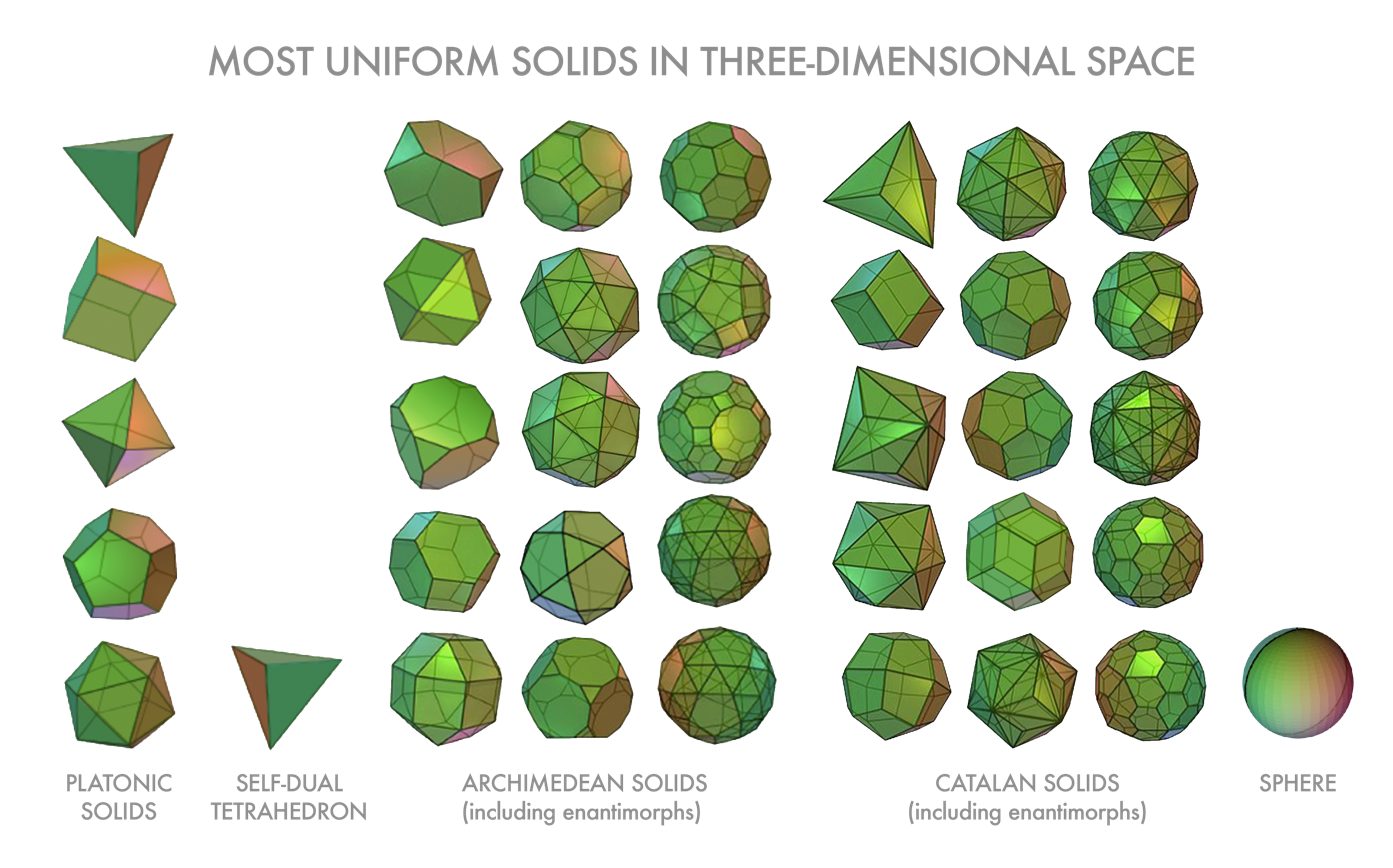
Uniform solids in three-dimensional space, including Platonic solids, the self-dual tetrahedron, Archimedean solids, Catalan solids, and the sphere.

In three-dimensional space, the most uniform solids are:

- the five Platonic solids (with one type of regular face)
- the fifteen Archimedean solids (counting enantimorphs, all with multiple regular faces); and
- the sphere (with only a singular facet).

In total, these number twenty-one figures, which when including their dual polytopes (i.e. an extra tetrahedron, and another fifteen Catalan solids), the total becomes 6 + 30 + 1 = 37 (the sphere does not have a dual figure).

The sphere in particular circumscribes all the above regular and semiregular polyhedra (as a fundamental property); all of these solids also have unique representations as spherical polyhedra, or spherical tilings.

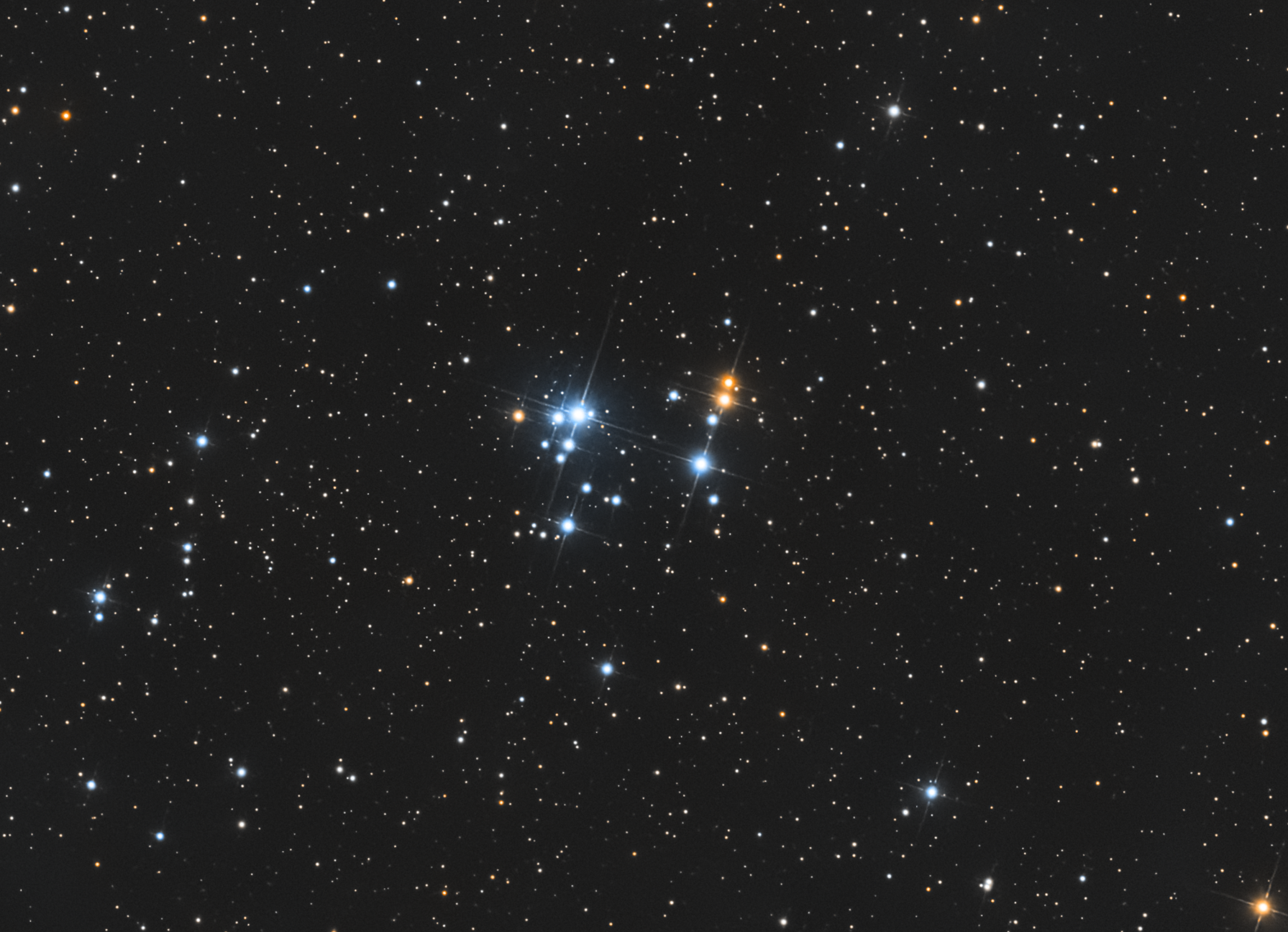
NGC 2169. It has an asterism in the form of the number 37.

== Science ==
- NGC 2169 has an asterism in the form of the number 37, due to its resemblance of the numerals.
- The average body temperature of a human in Celsius is around 37 degrees.
