= 3370 =

3370 may refer to:

- A.D. 3370, a year in the 4th millennium CE
- 3370 BC, a year in the 4th millennium BCE
- 3370, a number in the 3000 (number) range

== Other uses ==
- 3370 Kohsai, an asteroid in the Asteroid Belt, the 3370th asteroid registered
- IBM 3370, a hard disk drive unit
- Texas Farm to Market Road 3370, a state highway
