= 3470 =

3470 may refer to:

- A.D. 3470, a year in the 4th millennium CE
- 3470 BC, a year in the 4th millennium BCE
- 3470, a number in the 3000 (number) range

== Other uses ==
- 3470 Yaronika, an asteroid in the Asteroid Belt, the 3470th asteroid registered
- Texas Farm to Market Road 3470, a state highway
