= 1124 (disambiguation) =

1124 can refer to:

- The years 1124, and 1124 BC
- 1124 (number), a natural number

== Locations ==
- Farm to Market Road 1124, a Farm to Market Road

== Events ==
- 1124 in Ireland, events from Ireland in 1124
- 1124 papal election, a papal election

== In astronomy ==
- 1124 Stroobantia, an asteroid
- Kosmos 1124, a Soviet US-K missile early warning satellite

== Other uses ==
- United Nations Security Council Resolution 1124
- Code page 1124, a modified version of ISO 8859-5 designed to cover the Ukrainian language.
