= 999 (number) =

← 998	999	1000 →
- List of numbers; Integers; ← 0 100 200 300 400 500 600 700 800 900 →
- Cardinal: nine hundred ninety-nine
- Ordinal: 999th (nine hundred ninety-ninth)
- Factorization: 3^{3} × 37
- Divisors: 1, 3, 9, 27, 37, 111, 333, 999
- Greek numeral: ϠϞΘ´
- Roman numeral: CMXCIX, cmxcix
- Binary: 1111100111_{2}
- Ternary: 1101000_{3}
- Senary: 4343_{6}
- Octal: 1747_{8}
- Duodecimal: 6B3_{12}
- Hexadecimal: 3E7_{16}

999 (nine hundred [and] ninety-nine) is the natural number following 998 and preceding 1000. It is the largest 3-digit integer.

== In mathematics ==
999 is a palindrome number that is a repdigit. It is also a Kaprekar number and a 3-Kaprekar number, a Harshad number, a trimorphic number, and the smallest sum of three 3-digit prime numbers taken from a zeroless pandigital number (149 + 263 + 587 = 999). 999 can be written as the sum of three consecutive cuban primes which is 271 + 331 + 397.

999 can be used as a divisor to generate 3-digit decimal recurrences. For example, 123 / 999 = 0.123123123... .

== In other fields ==
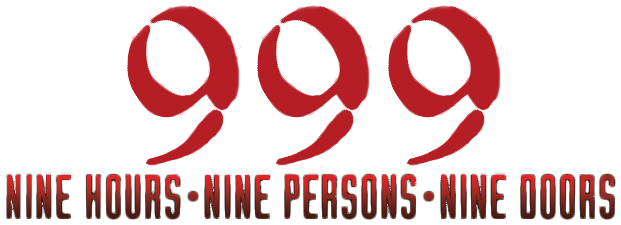
Logo of the game

- 999: Nine Hours, Nine Persons, Nine Doors is a Japanese visual novel and adventure game created by Chunsoft.
- 999 is a emergency telephone number in a number of countries which include Bahrain, Bangladesh, Botswana, the Cook Islands, Eswatini, Ghana, Guernsey, Hong Kong, the Republic of Ireland, the Isle of Man, Jersey, Kenya, Macau, Malaysia, Mauritius, Niue, Poland, Qatar, Sudan, Saudi Arabia, Singapore, Trinidad and Tobago, Seychelles, Uganda, the United Arab Emirates, the United Kingdom, and Zimbabwe.
- In many video games, 999 is the maximum score it could display.
