= 3340 =

3340 may refer to:

- A.D. 3340, a year in the 4th millennium CE
- 3340 BC, a year in the 4th millennium BCE
- 3340, a number in the 3000 (number) range

== Other uses ==
- 3340 Yinhai, an asteroid in the Asteroid Belt, the 3340th asteroid registered
- IBM 3340, a hard disk drive
- Texas Farm to Market Road 3340, a state highway
