= 5000 (number) =

← 4999	5000	5001 →
- List of numbers; Integers; ← 0 1k 2k 3k 4k 5k 6k 7k 8k 9k →
- Cardinal: five thousand
- Ordinal: 5000th (five thousandth)
- Factorization: 2^{3} × 5^{4}
- Greek numeral: ,Ε´
- Roman numeral: V̅, v̅
- Unicode symbol(s): V̅, v̅, ↁ
- Binary: 1001110001000_{2}
- Ternary: 20212012_{3}
- Senary: 35052_{6}
- Octal: 11610_{8}
- Duodecimal: 2A88_{12}
- Hexadecimal: 1388_{16}
- Armenian: Ր

5000 (five thousand) is the natural number following 4999 and preceding 5001. Five thousand is, at the same time, the largest isogrammic numeral, and the smallest number that contains every one of the five vowels (a, e, i, o, u) unrepeated in certain dialects of the English language (i.e. those that do not include the word “and” when writing out 230, 250, 260, 602, and 640).

== Selected numbers in the range 5001–5999 ==
=== 5001 to 5099 ===
- 5003 – Sophie Germain prime
- 5020 – amicable number with 5564
- 5021 – super-prime, twin prime with 5023
- 5023 – twin prime with 5021
- 5039 – factorial prime, Sophie Germain prime
- 5040 = 7!, superior highly composite number
- 5041 = 71^{2}, centered octagonal number
- 5050 – triangular number, Kaprekar number,
- 5051 – Sophie Germain prime
- 5059 – super-prime
- 5076 – decagonal number
- 5081 – Sophie Germain prime
- 5087 – safe prime
- 5099 – safe prime

=== 5100 to 5199 ===
- 5107 – super-prime, balanced prime
- 5113 – balanced prime,
- 5117 – sum of the first 50 primes
- 5151 – triangular number
- 5167 – Leonardo prime, cuban prime of the form x = y + 1
- 5171 – Sophie Germain prime
- 5188 – centered heptagonal number
- 5189 – super-prime

=== 5200 to 5299 ===
- 5209 – largest minimal prime in base 6
- 5226 – nonagonal number
- 5231 – Sophie Germain prime
- 5244 = 22^{2} + 23^{2} + ... + 29^{2} = 20^{2} + 21^{2} + ... + 28^{2}
- 5249 – highly cototient number
- 5253 – triangular number
- 5279 – Sophie Germain prime, twin prime with 5281, 700th prime number
- 5280 is
  - the number of feet in a mile. It is divisible by three, yielding 1760 yards per mile and by 16.5, yielding 320 rods per mile.
  - a number connected with both Klein's J-invariant and the Heegner numbers. Specifically: $5280 = -\sqrt[3]{j\left( {\scriptstyle\frac{1}{2}} \left( 1 + i\sqrt{67}\, \right)\right) }.$
- 5281 – super-prime, twin prime with 5279
- 5282 - used in various paintings by Thomas Kinkade
- 5292 – Kaprekar number

=== 5300 to 5399 ===
- 5303 – Sophie Germain prime, balanced prime
- 5329 = 73^{2}, centered octagonal number
- 5333 – Sophie Germain prime
- 5335 – magic constant of n × n normal magic square and n-queens problem for n = 22.
- 5340 – octahedral number
- 5350 - sum of the first 51 primes
- 5356 – triangular number
- 5365 – decagonal number
- 5381 – super-prime
- 5387 – safe prime, balanced prime
- 5392 – Leyland number
- 5393 – balanced prime
- 5399 – Sophie Germain prime, safe prime

=== 5400 to 5499 ===
- 5405 – member of a Ruth–Aaron pair with 5406 (either definition)
- 5406 – member of a Ruth–Aaron pair with 5405 (either definition)
- 5419 – Cuban prime of the form x = y + 1
- 5441 – Sophie Germain prime, super-prime
- 5456 – tetrahedral number
- 5459 – highly cototient number
- 5460 – triangular number
- 5461 – super-Poulet number, centered heptagonal number
- 5483 – safe prime

=== 5500 to 5599 ===
- 5500 – nonagonal number
- 5501 – Sophie Germain prime, twin prime with 5503
- 5503 – super-prime, twin prime with 5501, cousin prime with 5507
- 5507 – safe prime, cousin prime with 5503
- 5525 – square pyramidal number
- 5527 – happy prime
- 5536 – tetranacci number
- 5557 – super-prime
- 5563 – balanced prime
- 5564 – amicable number with 5020
- 5565 – triangular number
- 5566 – pentagonal pyramidal number
- 5569 – happy prime
- 5571 – perfect totient number
- 5589 - sum of the first 52 primes

=== 5600 to 5699 ===
- 5623 – super-prime
- 5625 = 75^{2}, centered octagonal number
- 5631 – number of compositions of 15 whose run-lengths are either weakly increasing or weakly decreasing
- 5639 – Sophie Germain prime, safe prime
- 5651 – super-prime
- 5659 – happy prime, completes the eleventh prime quadruplet set
- 5662 – decagonal number
- 5671 – triangular number

=== 5700 to 5799 ===
- 5701 – super-prime,
- 5711 – Sophie Germain prime
- 5719 – Lucas–Carmichael number
- 5741 – Sophie Germain prime, Pell prime, Markov prime, centered heptagonal number
- 5743 = number of signed trees with 9 nodes
- 5749 – super-prime
- 5768 – tribonacci number
- 5777 – smallest counterexample to the conjecture that all odd numbers are of the form p + 2a^{2}
- 5778 – triangular number
- 5781 – nonagonal number
- 5798 – Motzkin number

=== 5800 to 5899 ===
- 5801 – super-prime
- 5807 – safe prime, balanced prime
- 5830 - sum of the first 53 primes
- 5842 – member of the Padovan sequence
- 5849 – Sophie Germain prime
- 5869 – super-prime
- 5879 – safe prime, highly cototient number
- 5886 – triangular number

=== 5900 to 5999 ===
- 5903 – Sophie Germain prime
- 5927 – safe prime
- 5929 = 77^{2}, centered octagonal number
- 5939 – safe prime
- 5967 – decagonal number
- 5971 – first composite Wilson number
- 5984 – tetrahedral number
- 5995 – triangular number

=== Prime numbers ===
There are 114 prime numbers between 5000 and 6000:

5003, 5009, 5011, 5021, 5023, 5039, 5051, 5059, 5077, 5081, 5087, 5099, 5101, 5107, 5113, 5119, 5147, 5153, 5167, 5171, 5179, 5189, 5197, 5209, 5227, 5231, 5233, 5237, 5261, 5273, 5279, 5281, 5297, 5303, 5309, 5323, 5333, 5347, 5351, 5381, 5387, 5393, 5399, 5407, 5413, 5417, 5419, 5431, 5437, 5441, 5443, 5449, 5471, 5477, 5479, 5483, 5501, 5503, 5507, 5519, 5521, 5527, 5531, 5557, 5563, 5569, 5573, 5581, 5591, 5623, 5639, 5641, 5647, 5651, 5653, 5657, 5659, 5669, 5683, 5689, 5693, 5701, 5711, 5717, 5737, 5741, 5743, 5749, 5779, 5783, 5791, 5801, 5807, 5813, 5821, 5827, 5839, 5843, 5849, 5851, 5857, 5861, 5867, 5869, 5879, 5881, 5897, 5903, 5923, 5927, 5939, 5953, 5981, 5987
