= Octagonal number =

Number of points in an octagonal arrangement

The first five octagonal numbers illustrated.

In mathematics, an octagonal number is a figurate number. The nth octagonal number o_{n} is the number of dots in a pattern of dots consisting of the outlines of regular octagons with sides up to n dots, when the octagons are overlaid so that they share one vertex. The octagonal number for n is given by the formula 3n^{2} − 2n, with n > 0. The first few octagonal numbers are

1, 8, 21, 40, 65, 96, 133, 176, 225, 280, 341, 408, 481, 560, 645, 736, 833, 936 (sequence A000567 in the OEIS)

The octagonal number for n can also be calculated by adding the square of n to twice the (n − 1)th pronic number.

Octagonal numbers consistently alternate parity.

Octagonal numbers are occasionally referred to as "star numbers", though that term is more commonly used to refer to centered dodecagonal numbers.

== Applications in combinatorics ==
The $n$th octagonal number is the number of partitions of $6n-5$ into 1, 2, or 3s. For example, there are $x_2=8$ such partitions for $2\cdot 6-5=7$, namely

[1,1,1,1,1,1,1], [1,1,1,1,1,2], [1,1,1,1,3], [1,1,1,2,2], [1,1,2,3], [1,2,2,2], [1,3,3] and [2,2,3].

== Sum of reciprocals ==
A formula for the sum of the reciprocals of the octagonal numbers is given by
$$\sum_{n=1}^\infty \frac{1}{n(3n-2)} = \frac{9\ln(3)+\sqrt3\pi}{12}.$$

== Test for octagonal numbers ==
Solving the formula for the n-th octagonal number, $x_n,$ for n gives
$$n= \frac{\sqrt{3x_n+1}+1}{3}.$$
An arbitrary number x can be checked for octagonality by putting it in this equation. If n is an integer, then x is the n-th octagonal number. If n is not an integer, then x is not octagonal.

== See also ==
- Centered octagonal number
