= Minimal prime (recreational mathematics) =

In recreational number theory, a minimal prime is a prime number for which there is no shorter subsequence of its digits in a given base that form a prime. In base 10 there are exactly 26 minimal primes:

2, 3, 5, 7, 11, 19, 41, 61, 89, 409, 449, 499, 881, 991, 6469, 6949, 9001, 9049, 9649, 9949, 60649, 666649, 946669, 60000049, 66000049, 66600049 (sequence A071062 in the OEIS).

For example, 409 is a minimal prime because there is no prime among the shorter subsequences of the digits: 4, 0, 9, 40, 49, 09. The subsequence does not have to consist of consecutive digits, so 109 is not a minimal prime (because 19 is prime). But it does have to be in the same order; so, for example, 991 is still a minimal prime even though a subset of the digits can form the shorter prime 19 by changing the order.

Similarly, there are exactly 32 composite numbers which have no shorter composite subsequence:

4, 6, 8, 9, 10, 12, 15, 20, 21, 22, 25, 27, 30, 32, 33, 35, 50, 51, 52, 55, 57, 70, 72, 75, 77, 111, 117, 171, 371, 711, 713, 731 (sequence A071070 in the OEIS).

There are 146 primes congruent to 1 mod 4 which have no shorter prime congruent to 1 mod 4 subsequence:

5, 13, 17, 29, 37, 41, 61, 73, 89, 97, 101, 109, 149, 181, 233, 277, 281, 349, 409, 433, 449, 677, 701, 709, 769, 821, 877, 881, 1669, 2221, 3001, 3121, 3169, 3221, 3301, 3833, 4969, 4993, 6469, 6833, 6949, 7121, 7477, 7949, 9001, 9049, 9221, 9649, 9833, 9901, 9949, ... (sequence A111055 in the OEIS)

There are 113 primes congruent to 3 mod 4 which have no shorter prime congruent to 3 mod 4 subsequence:

3, 7, 11, 19, 59, 251, 491, 499, 691, 991, 2099, 2699, 2999, 4051, 4451, 4651, 5051, 5651, 5851, 6299, 6451, 6551, 6899, 8291, 8699, 8951, 8999, 9551, 9851, ... (sequence A111056 in the OEIS)

== Other bases ==
Minimal primes can be generalized to other bases. It can be shown that there are only a finite number of minimal primes in every base. Equivalently, every sufficiently large prime contains a shorter subsequence that forms a prime.

b	minimal primes in base b (written in base b, the letters A, B, C, ... represent values 10, 11, 12, ...)	number of minimal primes in base b
1	11	1
2	10, 11	2
3	2, 10, 111	3
4	2, 3, 11	3
5	2, 3, 10, 111, 401, 414, 14444, 44441	8
6	2, 3, 5, 11, 4401, 4441, 40041	7
7	2, 3, 5, 10, 14, 16, 41, 61, 11111	9
8	2, 3, 5, 7, 111, 141, 161, 401, 661, 4611, 6101, 6441, 60411, 444641, 444444441	15
9	2, 3, 5, 7, 14, 18, 41, 81, 601, 661, 1011, 1101	12
10	2, 3, 5, 7, 11, 19, 41, 61, 89, 409, 449, 499, 881, 991, 6469, 6949, 9001, 9049, 9649, 9949, 60649, 666649, 946669, 60000049, 66000049, 66600049	26
11	2, 3, 5, 7, 10, 16, 18, 49, 61, 81, 89, 94, 98, 9A, 199, 1AA, 414, 919, A1A, AA1, 11A9, 66A9, A119, A911, AAA9, 11144, 11191, 1141A, 114A1, 1411A, 144A4, 14A11, 1A114, 1A411, 4041A, 40441, 404A1, 4111A, 411A1, 44401, 444A1, 44A01, 6A609, 6A669, 6A696, 6A906, 6A966, 90901, 99111, A0111, A0669, A0966, A0999, A0A09, A4401, A6096, A6966, A6999, A9091, A9699, A9969, 401A11, 404001, 404111, 440A41, 4A0401, 4A4041, 60A069, 6A0096, 6A0A96, 6A9099, 6A9909, 909991, 999901, A00009, A60609, A66069, A66906, A69006, A90099, A90996, A96006, A96666, 111114A, 1111A14, 1111A41, 1144441, 14A4444, 1A44444, 4000111, 4011111, 41A1111, 4411111, 444441A, 4A11111, 4A40001, 6000A69, 6000A96, 6A00069, 9900991, 9990091, A000696, A000991, A006906, A040041, A141111, A600A69, A906606, A909009, A990009, 40A00041, 60A99999, 99000001, A0004041, A9909006, A9990006, A9990606, A9999966, 40000A401, 44A444441, 900000091, A00990001, A44444111, A66666669, A90000606, A99999006, A99999099, 600000A999, A000144444, A900000066, A0000000001, A0014444444, 40000000A0041, A000000014444, A044444444441, A144444444411, 40000000000401, A0000044444441, A00000000444441, 11111111111111111, 14444444444441111, 44444444444444111, A1444444444444444, A9999999999999996, 1444444444444444444, 4000000000000000A041, A999999999999999999999, A44444444444444444444444441, 40000000000000000000000000041, 440000000000000000000000000001, 999999999999999999999999999999991, 444444444444444444444444444444444444444444441	152
12	2, 3, 5, 7, B, 11, 61, 81, 91, 401, A41, 4441, A0A1, AAAA1, 44AAA1, AAA0001, AA000001	17

The base 12 minimal primes written in base 10 are listed in (sequence A110600 in the OEIS).

Number of minimal (probable) primes in base n are

1, 2, 3, 3, 8, 7, 9, 15, 12, 26, 152, 17, 228, 240, 100, 483, 1280, 50, 3463, 651, 2601, 1242, 6021, 306, (17608 or 17609), 5664, 17215, 5784, (57296 or 57297), 220, ...

The length of the largest minimal (probable) prime in base n are

2, 2, 3, 2, 5, 5, 5, 9, 4, 8, 45, 8, 32021, 86, 107, 3545, (≥111334), 33, (≥110986), 449, (≥479150), 764, 800874, 100, (≥136967), (≥8773), (≥109006), (≥94538), (≥174240), 1024, ...

Largest minimal (probable) prime in base n (written in base 10) are

2, 3, 13, 5, 3121, 5209, 2801, 76695841, 811, 66600049, 29156193474041220857161146715104735751776055777, 388177921, ... (next term has 35670 digits) (sequence A326609 in the OEIS)

Number of minimal composites in base n are

1, 3, 4, 9, 10, 19, 18, 26, 28, 32, 32, 46, 43, 52, 54, 60, 60, 95, 77, 87, 90, 94, 97, 137, 117, 111, 115, 131, 123, 207, ...

The length of the largest minimal composite in base n are

4, 4, 3, 3, 3, 4, 3, 3, 2, 3, 3, 4, 3, 3, 2, 3, 3, 4, 3, 3, 2, 3, 3, 4, 2, 3, 2, 3, 3, 4, ...
