= Nonagonal number =

Type of figurate number

A nonagonal number, or an enneagonal number, is a figurate number that extends the concept of triangular and square numbers to the nonagon (a nine-sided polygon). However, unlike the triangular and square numbers, the patterns involved in the construction of nonagonal numbers are not rotationally symmetrical. Specifically, the nth nonagonal number counts the dots in a pattern of n nested nonagons, all sharing a common corner, where the ith nonagon in the pattern has sides made of i dots spaced one unit apart from each other. The nonagonal number for n is given by the formula:

$$\frac {n(7n - 5)}{2}$$.

== Nonagonal numbers ==
The first few nonagonal numbers are:

0, 1, 9, 24, 46, 75, 111, 154, 204, 261, 325, 396, 474, 559, 651, 750, 856, 969, 1089, 1216, 1350, 1491, 1639, 1794, 1956, 2125, 2301, 2484, 2674, 2871, 3075, 3286, 3504, 3729, 3961, 4200, 4446, 4699, 4959, 5226, 5500, 5781, 6069, 6364, 6666, 6975, 7291, 7614, 7944, 8281, 8625, 8976, 9334, 9699 (sequence A001106 in the OEIS).

The parity of nonagonal numbers follows the pattern odd-odd-even-even.

== Relationship between nonagonal and triangular numbers ==
Letting $N_n$ denote the n^{th} nonagonal number, and using the formula $T_n = \frac{n(n+1)}{2}$ for the n^{th} triangular number,

$7N_n + 3 = T_{7n-3}$.

== Test for nonagonal numbers ==
To test if a given positive integer x is a nonagonal number, one can calculate

$$n = \frac{\sqrt{56x+25}+5}{14}$$.

If n is an integer, then x is the n-th nonagonal number. If n is not an integer, then x is not nonagonal.

== See also ==
- Centered nonagonal number
