= Emirp =

Class of prime numbers

An emirp (pronounced /ˈiːmərp/ or /ˈɛmərp/, an anadrome of prime) is a prime number that results in a different prime when its decimal digits (digits in base 10) are reversed. This definition excludes the related palindromic primes. A reversible prime is the same, but may or may not also include the palindromic primes.

The first few emirps are

13, 17, 31, 37, 71, 73, 79, 97, 107, 113, 149, 157, 167, 179, 199, ... (sequence A006567 in the OEIS).

The first few reversible primes are

2, 3, 5, 7, 11, 13, 17, 31, 37, 71, 73, 79, 97, 101, 107, ... (sequence A007500 in the OEIS).

The difference in all pairs of emirps is always a multiple of 18. This follows from all primes bigger than 2 being odd (making their differences even, i.e. multiples of 2) and from differences between pairs of natural numbers with reversed digits being multiples of 9 (which itself is a consequence of $10^n-1$ being a multiple of 9 for every non-negative integer $n$).

All non-palindromic permutable primes are emirps.

It is not known whether there are infinitely many emirps. The largest known emirp as of April 19, 2026 is 10^{111956} - 7 × 10^{53855} - 1 by Ryan Propper and Serge Batalov. The integer's reverse is 10^{111956} - 7 × 10^{58100} - 1.

== History ==
The term "emirp" was coined by American mathematician Jeremiah Farrell.

== Count of emirps ==
The following table shows the number of n-digit emirps and reversible primes: (sequences A152014 and A048054 in the OEIS)

n	Count of n-digit emirps	Count of n-digit reversible primes
1	0	4
2	8	9
3	28	43
4	204	204
5	1406	1499
6	9538	9538
7	70474	71142
8	535578	535578
9	4192024	4197196
10	33619380	33619380
11	274890230	274932272
12	2294771254	2294771254
13	19489532362	19489886063
14	167630912672	167630912672
15	1456473362820	1456476399463

The number of n-digit reversible primes is equal to the number of n-digit emirps plus the number of n-digit palindromic primes.

== Largest known emirps ==
The following table shows the largest known emirps throughout the years:

Number	Reverse	Digits	Date found	Discoverer
10^{1708} + 2047101 × 10^{851} + 1	10^{1708} + 1017402 × 10^{851} + 1	1709	1997	H. Dubner
7894807 × 10^{1993} + 1	10^{1999} + 7084987	2000	June 2001	Carlos Rivera
10^{3929} - 571624798 × 10^{1960} - 1	10^{3929} - 897426175 × 10^{1960} - 1	3929	June 2003	J. K. Andersen
10^{10006} + 941992101 × 10^{4999} + 1	10^{10006} + 101299149 × 10^{4999} + 1	10007	October 2007	J. K. Andersen
3867632931 × 10^{10001} + 1	10^{10010} + 1392367683	10011	February 16, 2026	Stephan Schöler
117954861 × 10^{11111} + 1	10^{11119} + 168459711	11120	March 12, 2026	Mykola Kamenyuk
989263739 × 10^{15298} + 111258179	971852111 × 10^{15298} + 937362989	15307	March 17, 2026	Simon Cavegn
10^{20000} + 518406362 × 10^{9996} + 1	10^{20000} + 263604815 × 10^{9996} + 1	20001	March 19, 2026	Unknown
10^{47253} - 22 × 10^{21607} - 1	10^{47253} - 22 × 10^{25644} - 1	47253	March 27, 2026	Serge Batalov
10^{77763} - 4 × 10^{25683} - 1	10^{77763} - 4 × 10^{52079} - 1	77763	April 6, 2026	Ryan Propper and Serge Batalov
10^{111956} - 7 × 10^{53855} - 1	10^{111956} - 7 × 10^{58100} - 1	111956	April 19, 2026	Ryan Propper and Serge Batalov

== Other bases ==
Emirps also exist for bases other than 10. For example, 10111_{2} = 23 is an emirp in the binary numeral system because 23 is a prime and its reverse 11101_{2} = 29 is also a prime.

The first few binary emirps are

11, 13, 23, 29, 37, 41, 43, 47, 53, 61, 67, 71, 83, 97, 101, ... (sequence A080790 in the OEIS).

Dartyge et al. (2023) have shown that, in big-O notation, the number of n-digit reversible primes in binary is $O\left(\frac{2^n}{n^2}\right)$.

They also conjecture that the number of n-digit reversible primes in binary is $(3+o(1))\frac{2^{n-1}}{(\log2^n)^2}$ as n goes large.

== Emirpimes ==
The term emirpimes (singular) is used also in places to treat semiprimes in a similar way. That is, an emirpimes is a semiprime that is also a (distinct) semiprime upon reversing its digits.

The first few emirpimeses are

15, 26, 39, 49, 51, 58, 62, 85, 93, 94, 115, 122, 123, ... (sequence A097393 in the OEIS).
