= Pronic number =

Number, product of consecutive integers

A pronic number is a number that is the product of two consecutive integers, that is, a number of the form $n(n+1)$. The study of these numbers dates back to Aristotle. They are also called oblong numbers, heteromecic numbers, or rectangular numbers; however, the term "rectangular number" has also been applied to the composite numbers.

The first 60 pronic numbers are:

0, 2, 6, 12, 20, 30, 42, 56, 72, 90, 110, 132, 156, 182, 210, 240, 272, 306, 342, 380, 420, 462, 506, 552, 600, 650, 702, 756, 812, 870, 930, 992, 1056, 1122, 1190, 1260, 1332, 1406, 1482, 1560, 1640, 1722, 1806, 1892, 1980, 2070, 2162, 2256, 2352, 2450, 2550, 2652, 2756, 2862, 2970, 3080, 3192, 3306, 3422, 3540, 3660... (sequence A002378 in the OEIS).

Letting $P_n$ denote the pronic number $n(n+1)$, we have $P_{{-}n} = P_{n{-}1}$. Therefore, in discussing pronic numbers, we may assume that $n\geq 0$ without loss of generality, a convention that is adopted in the following sections.

== As figurate numbers ==
Twice a triangular number is a pronic number

The nth pronic number is n more than the nth square number and n+1 less than the (n+1)st square

The pronic numbers were studied as figurate numbers alongside the triangular numbers and square numbers in Aristotle's Metaphysics, and their discovery has been attributed much earlier to the Pythagoreans. As a kind of figurate number, the pronic numbers are sometimes called oblong because they are analogous to polygonal numbers in this way:

*	*	*	*
1 × 2	2 × 3	3 × 4	4 × 5

The nth pronic number is the sum of the first n even integers, and as such is twice the nth triangular number and n more than the nth square number, as given by the alternative formula n^{2} + n for pronic numbers. Hence the nth pronic number and the nth square number (the sum of the first n odd integers) form a superparticular ratio:

$$\frac{n(n+1)}{n^2} = \frac{n + 1}{n}$$

Due to this ratio, the nth pronic number is at a radius of n and n + 1 from a perfect square, and the nth perfect square is at a radius of n from a pronic number. The nth pronic number is also the difference between the odd square (2n + 1)^{2} and the (n+1)st centered hexagonal number.

Since the number of off-diagonal entries in a square matrix is twice a triangular number, it is a pronic number.

== Sum of pronic numbers ==
The partial sum of the first n positive pronic numbers is twice the value of the nth tetrahedral number:

$$\sum_{k=1}^{n} k(k+1) =\frac{n(n+1)(n+2)}{3}= 2T_n$$.

The sum of the reciprocals of the positive pronic numbers (excluding 0) is a telescoping series that sums to 1:

$$\sum_{i=1}^{\infty} \frac{1}{i(i+1)}=\frac{1}{2}+\frac{1}{6}+\frac{1}{12}+\frac{1}{20}\cdots=1$$.

The partial sum of the first n terms in this series is

$$\sum_{i=1}^{n} \frac{1}{i(i+1)} =\frac{n}{n+1}$$.

The alternating sum of the reciprocals of the positive pronic numbers (excluding 0) is a convergent series:

$$\sum_{i=1}^{\infty} \frac{(-1)^{i+1}}{i(i+1)}=\frac{1}{2}-\frac{1}{6}+\frac{1}{12}-\frac{1}{20}\cdots=\log(4)-1$$.

== In quantum mechanics ==
In quantum mechanics, a wave-particle's spin angular momentum $L$, specifically its total spin magnitude, is defined by the reduced Planck constant $\hbar=\frac{h}{2\pi}$ times the square root of a half-integer pronic number $\frac{n}{2}$:

$L=\hbar\sqrt{\frac{n}{2}(\frac{n}{2}+1)}$.

== Additional properties ==
Pronic numbers are even, and 2 is the only prime pronic number. It is also the only pronic number in the Fibonacci sequence and the only pronic Lucas number.

The arithmetic mean of two consecutive pronic numbers is a square number:

$$\frac {n(n+1) + (n+1)(n+2)}{2} = (n+1)^2$$

So there is a square between any two consecutive pronic numbers. It is unique, since

$$n^2 \leq n(n+1) < (n+1)^2 < (n+1)(n+2) < (n+2)^2.$$

Another consequence of this chain of inequalities is the following property. If m is a pronic number, then the following holds:

$$\lfloor{\sqrt{m}}\rfloor \cdot \lceil{\sqrt{m}}\rceil = m.$$

The fact that consecutive integers are coprime and that a pronic number is the product of two consecutive integers leads to a number of properties. Each distinct prime factor of a pronic number is present in only one of the factors n or n + 1. Thus a pronic number is squarefree if and only if n and n + 1 are also squarefree. The number of distinct prime factors of a pronic number is the sum of the number of distinct prime factors of n and n + 1.

If 25 is appended to the decimal representation of any pronic number, the result is a square number, the square of a number ending on 5; for example, 625 = 25^{2} and 1225 = 35^{2}. This is so because

$$100n(n+1) + 25 = 100n^2 + 100n + 25 = (10n+5)^2$$.

The difference between two consecutive unit fractions is the reciprocal of a pronic number:

$$\frac{1}{n} - \frac{1}{n+1} = \frac{(n+1) - n}{n(n+1)} = \frac{1}{n(n+1)}$$
