= Star number =

Centered figurate number

- First four star numbers, by color.
- Total no. of terms: infinity
- Formula: $S_n=6n(n-1)+1$
- First terms: 1, 13, 37, 73, 121, 181
- OEIS index: A003154; star

The Chinese checkers board has 121 holes.

In mathematics, a star number is a centered figurate number, a centered hexagram (six-pointed star), such as the Star of David, or the board Chinese checkers is played on. The numbers are also called centered dodecagonal numbers because star numbers are centered polygonal numbers with a twelve-sided shape.

| 1 | 13 | 37 |
|---|---|---|
| * | * | * |

The nth star number is given by the formula S_{n} = 6n(n − 1) + 1. The first 45 star numbers are 1, 13, 37, 73, 121, 181, 253, 337, 433, 541, 661, 793, 937, 1093, 1261, 1441, 1633, 1837, 2053, 2281, 2521, 2773, 3037, 3313, 3601, 3901, 4213, 4537, 4873, 5221, 5581, 5953, 6337, 6733, 7141, 7561, 7993, 8437, 8893, 9361, 9841, 10333, 10837, 11353, and 11881. (sequence A003154 in the OEIS)

The digital root of a star number is always 1 or 4, and progresses in the sequence 1, 4, 1. The last two digits of a star number in base 10 are always 01, 13, 21, 33, 37, 41, 53, 61, 73, 81, or 93.

Unique among the star numbers is 35113, since its prime factors (i.e., 13, 37 and 73) are also consecutive star numbers.

== Relationships to other kinds of numbers ==
Proof without words that the n-th star number is 12 times the (n−1)-th triangular number, plus one

Geometrically, the nth star number is made up of a central point and 12 copies of the (n−1)th triangular number — making it numerically equal to the nth centered dodecagonal number, but differently arranged. As such, the formula the nth star number can be written as S_{n} = 1 + 12T_{n−1} where T_{n} = (n (n + 1))/2.

Infinitely many star numbers are also triangular numbers, the first four being S_{1} = 1 = T_{1}, S_{7} = 253 = T_{22}, S_{91} = 49141 = T_{313}, and S_{1261} = 9533161 = T_{4366}(sequence A156712 in the OEIS).

Infinitely many star numbers are also square numbers, the first four being S_{1} = 1^{2}, S_{5} = 121 = 11^{2}, S_{45} = 11881 = 109^{2}, and S_{441} = 1164241 = 1079^{2} (sequence A054318 in the OEIS), for square stars (sequence A006061 in the OEIS).

A star prime is a star number that is prime. The first few star primes are 13, 37, 73, 181, 337, 433, 541, 661, 937 ...(sequence A083577 in the OEIS)

A superstar prime is a star prime whose prime index is also a star number. The first two such numbers are 661 and 1750255921.

A reverse superstar prime is a star number whose index is a star prime. The first few such numbers are 937, 7993, 31537, 195481, 679393, 1122337, 1752841, 2617561, 5262193.

The term "star number" or "stellate number" is occasionally used to refer to octagonal numbers.

== Other properties ==
The harmonic series of unit fractions with the star numbers as denominators is:
$$\begin{align}
\sum_{n=1}^{\infty}& \frac{1}{S_n}\\
&=1+\frac{1}{13}+\frac{1}{37}+\frac{1}{73}+\frac{1}{121}+\frac{1}{181}+\frac{1}{253}+\frac{1}{337}+\cdots\\
&=\frac\pi{2\sqrt3}\tan (\frac \pi {2\sqrt3})\\
&\approx 1.159173.\\
\end{align}$$

The alternating series of unit fractions with the star numbers as denominators is:
$$\begin{align}
\sum_{n=1}^{\infty}& (-1)^{n-1}\frac{1}{S_n}\\
&=1-\frac{1}{13}+\frac{1}{37}-\frac{1}{73}+\frac{1}{121}-\frac{1}{181}+\frac{1}{253}-\frac{1}{337}+\cdots\\
&\approx 0.941419.\\
\end{align}$$

== See also ==
- Centered hexagonal number
