= Super-Poulet number =

Type of Poulet number

In number theory, a super-Poulet number is a Poulet number, or pseudoprime to base 2, whose every divisor $d$ divides $2^d - 2$.

For example, 341 is a super-Poulet number: it has positive divisors (1, 11, 31, 341), and we have:

(2^{11} − 2) / 11 = 2046 / 11 = 186
(2^{31} − 2) / 31 = 2147483646 / 31 = 69273666
(2^{341} − 2) / 341 = 13136332798696798888899954724741608669335164206654835981818117894215788100763407304286671514789484550

When $\frac{ \Phi_n(2)}{gcd(n, \Phi_n(2))}$ is not prime, then it and every divisor of it are a pseudoprime to base 2, and a super-Poulet number.

The super-Poulet numbers below 10,000 are (sequence A050217 in the OEIS):

n	
1	341 = 11 × 31
2	1387 = 19 × 73
3	2047 = 23 × 89
4	2701 = 37 × 73
5	3277 = 29 × 113
6	4033 = 37 × 109
7	4369 = 17 × 257
8	4681 = 31 × 151
9	5461 = 43 × 127
10	7957 = 73 × 109
11	8321 = 53 × 157

== Super-Poulet numbers with 3 or more distinct prime divisors ==
It is relatively easy to get super-Poulet numbers with 3 distinct prime divisors. If you find three Poulet numbers with three common prime factors, you get a super-Poulet number, as you built the product of the three prime factors.

Example: 2701 = 37 * 73 is a Poulet number, 4033 = 37 * 109 is a Poulet number, 7957 = 73 * 109 is a Poulet number;

so 294409 = 37 * 73 * 109 is a Poulet number too.

Super-Poulet numbers with up to 7 distinct prime factors you can get with the following numbers:

- { 103, 307, 2143, 2857, 6529, 11119, 131071 }
- { 709, 2833, 3541, 12037, 31153, 174877, 184081 }
- { 1861, 5581, 11161, 26041, 37201, 87421, 102301 }
- { 6421, 12841, 51361, 57781, 115561, 192601, 205441 }

For example, 1118863200025063181061994266818401 = 6421 * 12841 * 51361 * 57781 * 115561 * 192601 * 205441 is a super-Poulet number with 7 distinct prime factors and 120 Poulet numbers.
