= Centered octagonal number =

Centered figurate number that represents an octagon with a dot in the center

A centered octagonal number is a centered figurate number that represents an octagon with a dot in the center and all other dots surrounding the center dot in successive octagonal layers. The centered octagonal numbers are the same as the odd square numbers. Thus, the nth odd square number and tth centered octagonal number is given by

$$O_n = (2n-1)^2 = 4n^2-4n+1$$

Proof without words that all centered octagonal numbers are odd squares

The first few centered octagonal numbers are

1, 9, 25, 49, 81, 121, 169, 225, 289, 361, 441, 529, 625, 729, 841, 961, 1089, 1225

Calculating Ramanujan's tau function on a centered octagonal number yields an odd number, whereas for any other number the function yields an even number.

$O_n$ is the number of $2 \times 2$ matrices with elements from $0$ to $n$ whose determinant and permanent are both zero, i.e. that have an either a row or column that is identically zero.

== See also ==
- Octagonal number
