= Super-prime =

Prime numbers that occupy prime-numbered positions

Super-prime numbers, also known as higher-order primes or prime-indexed primes (PIPs), are the subsequence of prime numbers that occupy prime-numbered positions within the sequence of all prime numbers. In other words, if prime numbers are matched with ordinal numbers, starting with prime number 2 matched with ordinal number 1, then the primes matched with prime ordinal numbers are the super-primes.

The subsequence begins

3, 5, 11, 17, 31, 41, 59, 67, 83, 109, 127, 157, 179, 191, 211, 241, 277, 283, 331, 353, 367, 401, 431, 461, 509, 547, 563, 587, 599, 617, 709, 739, 773, 797, 859, 877, 919, 967, 991, ... (sequence A006450 in the OEIS).

That is, if p(n) denotes the nth prime number, the numbers in this sequence are those of the form p(p(n)).

n	1	2	3	4	5	6	7	8	9	10	11	12	13	14	15	16	17	18	19	20
p(n)	2	3	5	7	11	13	17	19	23	29	31	37	41	43	47	53	59	61	67	71
p(p(n))	3	5	11	17	31	41	59	67	83	109	127	157	179	191	211	241	277	283	331	353

In 1975, Robert Dressler and Thomas Parker used a computer-aided proof (based on calculations involving the subset sum problem) to show that every integer greater than 96 may be represented as a sum of distinct super-prime numbers. Their proof relies on a result resembling Bertrand's postulate, stating that (after the larger gap between super-primes 5 and 11) each super-prime number is less than twice its predecessor in the sequence.

A 2009 research showed that there are

$$\frac{x}{(\log x)^2} + O\left(\frac{x\log\log x}{(\log x)^3}\right)$$

super-primes up to x. This can be used to show that the set of all super-primes is small.

One can also define "higher-order" primeness much the same way and obtain analogous sequences of primes.

A variation on this theme is the sequence of prime numbers with palindromic prime indices, beginning with

3, 5, 11, 17, 31, 547, 739, 877, 1087, 1153, 2081, 2381, ... (sequence A124173 in the OEIS).
