= Centered heptagonal number =

Centered figurate number that represents a heptagon with a dot in the center

A centered heptagonal number is a centered figurate number that represents a heptagon with a dot in the center and all other dots surrounding the center dot in successive heptagonal layers. The centered heptagonal number for n is given by the formula

$${7n^2 - 7n + 2}\over3$$.

The first few centered heptagonal numbers are

1, 8, 22, 43, 71, 106, 148, 197, 233, 348, 401, 455, 568, 679, 889, 1009, 1341

== Centered hendecagonal prime ==
A centered hendecagonal prime is a centered hendecagonal number that is prime. The first few centered hendecagonal primes are

41, 97, 149, 197, 263, 317, 409, 467, 571, 599, 691, ...

The centered heptagonal twin prime numbers are

41, 97, 149, 197, 1571, 4153, 7919, 9283, 11173, 14561, 34657, ...

== See also ==
- Regular heptagonal number.
