= Cuban prime =

Type of prime number

Proof without words that the difference between two consecutive cubes is a centered hexagonal number, shown by arranging n^{3} balls in a cube and viewing them along a space diagonal –colors denote horizontal layers and the dashed lines the hexagonal number, respectively.

A cuban prime is a prime number that is also a solution to one of two different specific equations involving differences between third powers of two integers x and y.

== First series ==
This is the first of these equations:

$p = \frac{x^3 - y^3}{x - y},\ x = y + 1,\ y>0,$

i.e. the difference between two successive cubes. The first few cuban primes from this equation are

7, 19, 37, 61, 127, 271, 331, 397, 547, 631, 919, 1657, 1801, 1951, 2269, 2437, 2791, 3169, 3571, 4219, 4447, 5167, 5419, 6211, 7057, 7351, 8269, 9241, 10267, 11719, 12097, 13267, 13669, 16651, 19441, 19927, 22447, 23497, 24571, 25117, 26227 (sequence A002407 in the OEIS)

The formula for a general cuban prime of this kind can be simplified to $3y^2 + 3y + 1$. This is exactly the general form of a centered hexagonal number; that is, all of these cuban primes are centered hexagonal.

As of July 2023 the largest known cuban prime has 3,153,105 digits with $y = 3^{3304301} - 1$, found by R. Propper and S. Batalov.

== Second series ==
The second of these equations is:

$p = \frac{x^3 - y^3}{x - y},\ x = y + 2,\ y>0.$

which simplifies to $3y^2 + 6y + 4$. With a substitution $y = n - 1$ it can also be written as $3n^2 + 1, \ n>1$.

The first few cuban primes of this form are:

13, 109, 193, 433, 769, 1201, 1453, 2029, 3469, 3889, 4801, 10093, 12289, 13873, 18253, 20173, 21169, 22189, 28813, 37633, 43201, 47629, 60493, 63949, 65713, 69313 (sequence A002648 in the OEIS)

The name "cuban prime" has to do with the role cubes (third powers) play in the equations.

== See also ==
- Cubic function
- List of prime numbers
- Prime number
