= Wolstenholme =

Wolstenholme may refer to:

== People with the surname ==
- Andrew Wolstenholme (born 1959), British civil engineer, CEO of Crossrail
- Chris Wolstenholme (born 1978), English bassist for the rock band Muse
- Colleen Wolstenholme (born 1963), Canadian artist
- Elizabeth Clarke Wolstenholme Elmy (1834-1918), British suffragist and campaigner
- Eddie Wolstenholme (born c. 1954), English football referee
- Gordon Wolstenholme (1913–2004), British medical doctor and founding director of the Ciba Foundation.
- Guy Wolstenholme (1931–1984), English golfer
- Ian Wolstenholme (born 1943), English amateur footballer
- Jack Wolstenholme (1851–1914), New Zealand cricketer
- Sir John Wolstenholme, 1st Baronet (c. 1596–1670), English politician and landowner (see baronets, below)
- Jonathan Wolstenholme (born 1950), British artist and illustrator
- Joseph Wolstenholme (1829-1891), British mathematician
- Manjit Wolstenholme (1964–2017), British businesswoman, CEO of Provident Financial
- Kenneth Wolstenholme (1920–2002), English football commentator
- William Wolstenholme (1865–1931), English composer and organist

== Places ==
- Wolstenholme Towne, an English settlement from 1618–1622 in present-day Virginia, USA
- Wolstenholme Bay, in NW Greenland
- Wolstenholme Fjord, in NW Greenland
- Wolstenholme Island, in NW Greenland

== Titles ==
- Wolstenholme baronets, a baronetcy in the Baronetage of England

== Mathematics ==
- Wolstenholme prime, a prime number satisfying a certain congruence
- Wolstenholme number, a class of positive integers
- Wolstenholme's theorem, a congruence for binomial coefficients
