= Donald Dines Wall =

- Born: August 13, 1921; Kansas City, Missouri
- Died: November 28, 2000 (aged 79); Georgia
- Education: University of California, Berkeley
- Known for: Wall–Sun–Sun primes
- Scientific career
- Fields: Mathematics
- Doctoral advisor: Derrick Henry Lehmer

Donald Dines Wall (August 13, 1921 – November 28, 2000) was an American mathematician working primarily on number theory. He obtained his Ph.D. on normal numbers from University of California, Berkeley in 1949, where his adviser was Derrick Henry Lehmer. His better known papers include the first modern analysis of Fibonacci sequence modulo a positive integer.

Drawing on Wall's work, Zhi-Hong Sun and his twin brother Zhi-Wei Sun proved a theorem about what are now known as the Wall–Sun–Sun primes that guided the search for counterexamples to Fermat's Last Theorem.

== Early life ==
Wall was born in Kansas City, Missouri, on August 13, 1921 to Donald F. Wall and Mary Wooldridge. The family lived in Louisiana and Texas as he was growing up. In 1933, they moved to Whittier, California, then in 1936 to Santa Barbara, California, where he graduated from high school in 1938. He enrolled at UCLA and joined the Delta Sigma Phi fraternity.

In April 1940 he had a successful operation to remove a brain tumor at UC Hospital in San Francisco. The surgeon was Howard C. Naffziger, who later served on the board of Regents of the University of California. He and Naffziger kept in touch for many years afterwards.

== Career ==
He graduated from UCLA with a B.A. in Mathematics in the spring of 1944. After graduation he took a full-time job with Douglas Aircraft but continued in graduate school at UCLA.

In 1946 he received an M.A. in mathematical statistics from UCLA. In the same year he passed the first three of eight actuarial exams.

In 1947, he moved to Hartford, Connecticut, to work for the Aetna Life Insurance Company. He also taught an evening math class at Trinity College.

In the fall of 1947, he returned to graduate school at Harvard University, where he became interested in number theory. He also took a class at Massachusetts Institute of Technology.

In June 1948 he returned to California to complete his Ph.D. at UC Berkeley, where he also taught classes as a teaching assistant.

In 1949 he was awarded his Ph.D. in normal numbers from UC Berkeley.

In fall of 1949 he and his family moved to Santa Barbara where he took a job as instructor in mathematics at Santa Barbara College of the University of California. He taught general astronomy as well as number theory and other math courses. After two years, he was promoted to assistant professor.

In 1950, he taught a course in computer mathematics at Naval Air Station Point Mugu, where computers were being developed for calculating missile trajectories.

From his work at Pt Mugu, he was recruited by IBM to work as an Applied Science Representative starting July 1951 in Los Angeles. In 1956, he became IBM's Education Coordinator for the west coast. He traveled to interested universities in the western US to give them details of a program developed by the UCLA Anderson School of Management about the use of computers in business.

In 1958, he moved to White Plains, New York, and continued working at IBM until his retirement in 1982.

== Selected works ==
- ———; Hoel, P. G. (1947), "The accuracy of the root-squaring method for solving equations", J. Math. Phys., 26 (1–4): 156–164, doi:10.1002/sapm1947261156.
- ——— (1949), Normal numbers, Berkeley: Ph.D. thesis, Univ. California.
- ——— (1956), "The order of an iteration formula", Math. Tables Aids Comput., 10: 167–168.
- ——— (1960), "Fibonacci Series Modulo m", American Mathematical Monthly, 67 (6): 525–532, doi:10.2307/2309169, JSTOR 2309169
- ——— (1961), "Moments of a Function on the Cantor Set", American Mathematical Monthly, 68 (5): 460–461, doi:10.2307/2311100, JSTOR 2311100
