= Fermat quotient =

Concept in Number Theory

In number theory, the Fermat quotient of an integer a with respect to an odd prime p is defined as

$$q_p(a) = \frac{a^{p-1}-1}{p},$$

or

$$\delta_p(a) = \frac{a - a^p }{p}$$.

This article is about the former; for the latter see p-derivation. The quotient is named after Pierre de Fermat.

If the base a is coprime to the exponent p then Fermat's little theorem says that q_{p}(a) will be an integer. If the base a is also a generator of the multiplicative group of integers modulo p, then q_{p}(a) will be a cyclic number, and p will be a full reptend prime.

== Properties ==
From the definition, it is obvious that

$$\begin{align}
q_p(1) &\equiv 0 && \pmod{p} \\
q_p(-a)&\equiv q_p(a) && \pmod{p}\quad (\text{since } 2 \mid p-1)
\end{align}$$

In 1850, Gotthold Eisenstein proved that if a and b are both coprime to p, then:

$$\begin{align}
q_p(ab)  &\equiv q_p(a)+q_p(b) &&\pmod{p} \\
q_p(a^r) &\equiv rq_p(a) &&\pmod{p} \\
q_p(p \mp a) &\equiv q_p(a) \pm \tfrac{1}{a} &&\pmod{p} \\
q_p(p \mp 1) &\equiv \pm 1 && \pmod{p}
\end{align}$$

Eisenstein likened the first two of these congruences to properties of logarithms. These properties imply

$$\begin{align}
q_p \!\left(\tfrac{1}{a} \right) &\equiv -q_p(a) && \pmod{p} \\
q_p \!\left(\tfrac{a}{b} \right) &\equiv q_p(a) - q_p(b) &&\pmod{p}
\end{align}$$

In 1895, Dmitry Mirimanoff pointed out that an iteration of Eisenstein's rules gives the corollary:

$$q_p(a+np)\equiv q_p(a)-n\cdot\tfrac{1}{a} \pmod{p}.$$

From this, it follows that:

$$q_p(a+np^2)\equiv q_p(a) \pmod{p}.$$

== Lerch's formula ==
M. Lerch proved in 1905 that

$$\sum_{j=1}^{p-1}q_p(j)\equiv W_p\pmod{p}.$$

Here $W_p$ is the Wilson quotient.

== Special values ==
Eisenstein discovered that the Fermat quotient with base 2 could be expressed in terms of the sum of the reciprocals modulo p of the numbers lying in the first half of the range {1, ..., p − 1}:

$$-2q_p(2) \equiv \sum_{k=1}^{\frac{p-1}{2}} \frac{1}{k} \pmod{p}.$$

Later writers showed that the number of terms required in such a representation could be reduced from 1/2 to 1/4, 1/5, or even 1/6:

$-3q_p(2) \equiv \sum_{k=1}^{\lfloor\frac{p}{4}\rfloor} \frac{1}{k} \pmod{p}.$

$4q_p(2) \equiv \sum_{k=\lfloor\frac{p}{10}\rfloor + 1}^{\lfloor\frac{2p}{10}\rfloor} \frac{1}{k} + \sum_{k=\lfloor\frac{3p}{10}\rfloor + 1}^{\lfloor\frac{4p}{10}\rfloor} \frac{1}{k} \pmod{p}.$

$2q_p(2) \equiv \sum_{k=\lfloor\frac{p}{6}\rfloor+1}^{\lfloor\frac{p}{3}\rfloor} \frac{1}{k} \pmod{p}.$

Eisenstein's series also has an increasingly complex connection to the Fermat quotients with other bases, the first few examples being:

$-3q_p(3) \equiv 2\sum_{k=1}^{\lfloor\frac{p}{3}\rfloor} \frac{1}{k} \pmod{p}.$

$-5q_p(5) \equiv 4\sum_{k=1}^{\lfloor\frac{p}{5}\rfloor} \frac{1}{k} + 2\sum_{k=\lfloor\frac{p}{5}\rfloor+1}^{\lfloor\frac{2p}{5}\rfloor} \frac{1}{k} \pmod{p}.$

== Generalized Wieferich primes ==
If q_{p}(a) ≡ 0 (mod p) then a^{p−1} ≡ 1 (mod p^{2}). Primes for which this is true for a = 2 are called Wieferich primes. In general they are called Wieferich primes base a. Known solutions of q_{p}(a) ≡ 0 (mod p) for small values of a are:

a	p (checked up to 5 × 10^{13})	OEIS sequence
1	2, 3, 5, 7, 11, 13, 17, 19, 23, 29, ... (All primes)	A000040
2	1093, 3511	A001220
3	11, 1006003	A014127
4	1093, 3511	
5	2, 20771, 40487, 53471161, 1645333507, 6692367337, 188748146801	A123692
6	66161, 534851, 3152573	A212583
7	5, 491531	A123693
8	3, 1093, 3511	
9	2, 11, 1006003	
10	3, 487, 56598313	A045616
11	71	
12	2693, 123653	A111027
13	2, 863, 1747591	A128667
14	29, 353, 7596952219	A234810
15	29131, 119327070011	A242741
16	1093, 3511	
17	2, 3, 46021, 48947, 478225523351	A128668
18	5, 7, 37, 331, 33923, 1284043	A244260
19	3, 7, 13, 43, 137, 63061489	A090968
20	281, 46457, 9377747, 122959073	A242982
21	2	
22	13, 673, 1595813, 492366587, 9809862296159	A298951
23	13, 2481757, 13703077, 15546404183, 2549536629329	A128669
24	5, 25633	
25	2, 20771, 40487, 53471161, 1645333507, 6692367337, 188748146801	
26	3, 5, 71, 486999673, 6695256707	
27	11, 1006003	
28	3, 19, 23	
29	2	
30	7, 160541, 94727075783	

For more information, see and.

The smallest solutions of q_{p}(a) ≡ 0 (mod p) with a = n are:

2, 1093, 11, 1093, 2, 66161, 5, 3, 2, 3, 71, 2693, 2, 29, 29131, 1093, 2, 5, 3, 281, 2, 13, 13, 5, 2, 3, 11, 3, 2, 7, 7, 5, 2, 46145917691, 3, 66161, 2, 17, 8039, 11, 2, 23, 5, 3, 2, 3, ... (sequence A039951 in the OEIS)

A pair (p, r) of prime numbers such that q_{p}(r) ≡ 0 (mod p) and q_{r}(p) ≡ 0 (mod r) is called a Wieferich pair.
