= Fibonacci prime =

Prime number in the Fibonacci sequence

- No. of known terms: 37
- Conjectured no. of terms: Infinite
- First terms: 2, 3, 5, 13, 89, 233
- Largest known term: F_{11964299}
- OEIS index: A001605; Indices of prime Fibonacci numbers

A Fibonacci prime is a Fibonacci number that is prime, a type of integer sequence prime.

The first Fibonacci primes are (sequence A005478 in the OEIS):

2, 3, 5, 13, 89, 233, 1597, 28657, 514229, 433494437, 2971215073, ....

== Known Fibonacci primes ==
Unsolved problem in mathematics
Are there an infinite number of Fibonacci primes?
More unsolved problems in mathematics

It is not known whether there are infinitely many Fibonacci primes. With the indexing starting with F_{1} = F_{2} = 1, the first 37 indices n for which F_{n} is prime are (sequence A001605 in the OEIS):

n = 3, 4, 5, 7, 11, 13, 17, 23, 29, 43, 47, 83, 131, 137, 359, 431, 433, 449, 509, 569, 571, 2971, 4723, 5387, 9311, 9677, 14431, 25561, 30757, 35999, 37511, 50833, 81839, 104911, 130021, 148091, 201107.

(The values F_{n} rapidly become very large so only the indices, n, are listed.)

In addition to these proven Fibonacci primes, several probable primes have been found:

n = 397379, 433781, 590041, 593689, 604711, 931517, 1049897, 1285607, 1636007, 1803059, 1968721, 2904353, 3244369, 3340367, 4740217, 6530879, 7789819, 10317107, 10367321, 11964299.

Except for the case n = 4, all Fibonacci primes have a prime index, because if a divides b, then $F_a$ also divides $F_b$ (but not every prime index results in a Fibonacci prime). That is to say, the Fibonacci sequence is a divisibility sequence.

F_{p} is prime for 8 of the first 10 primes p; the exceptions are F_{2} = 1 and F_{19} = 4181 = 37 × 113. However, Fibonacci primes appear to become rarer as the index increases. F_{p} is prime for only 26 of the 1229 primes p smaller than 10,000. The number of prime factors in the Fibonacci numbers with prime index are:

0, 1, 1, 1, 1, 1, 1, 2, 1, 1, 2, 3, 2, 1, 1, 2, 2, 2, 3, 2, 2, 2, 1, 2, 4, 2, 3, 2, 2, 2, 2, 1, 1, 3, 4, 2, 4, 4, 2, 2, 3, 3, 2, 2, 4, 2, 4, 4, 2, 5, 3, 4, 3, 2, 3, 3, 4, 2, 2, 3, 4, 2, 4, 4, 4, 3, 2, 3, 5, 4, 2, 1, ... (sequence A080345 in the OEIS)

As of September 2023, the largest known certain Fibonacci prime is F_{201107}, with 42029 digits. It was proved prime by Maia Karpovich in September 2023. The largest known probable Fibonacci prime is F_{11964299}. It was found by Ryan Propper in June 2025. It was proved by Nick MacKinnon that the only Fibonacci numbers that are also twin primes are 3, 5, and 13.

== Divisibility of Fibonacci numbers ==
A prime $p$ divides $F_{p-1}$ if and only if p is congruent to ±1 modulo 5, and p divides $F_{p+1}$ if and only if it is congruent to ±2 modulo 5. (For p = 5, F_{5} = 5 so 5 divides F_{5})

Fibonacci numbers that have a prime index p do not share any common divisors greater than 1 with the preceding Fibonacci numbers, due to the identity:

$$\gcd(F_n, F_m) = F_{\gcd(n,m)}.$$

For n ≥ 3, F_{n} divides F_{m} if and only if n divides m.

If we suppose that m is a prime number p, and n is less than p, then it is clear that F_{p} cannot share any common divisors with the preceding Fibonacci numbers.

$$\gcd(F_p, F_n) = F_{\gcd(p,n)} = F_1 = 1.$$

This means that F_{p} will always have characteristic factors or be a prime characteristic factor itself. The number of distinct prime factors of each Fibonacci number can be put into simple terms.

- F_{nk} is a multiple of F_{k} for all values of n and k such that n ≥ 1 and k ≥ 1. It's safe to say that F_{nk} will have "at least" the same number of distinct prime factors as F_{k}. All F_{p} will have no factors of F_{k}, but "at least" one new characteristic prime from Carmichael's theorem.
- Carmichael's Theorem applies to all Fibonacci numbers except four special cases: $F_1 =F_2 =1, F_6 = 8$ and $F_{12} = 144.$ If we look at the prime factors of a Fibonacci number, there will be at least one of them that has never before appeared as a factor in any earlier Fibonacci number. Let π_{n} be the number of distinct prime factors of F_{n}. (sequence A022307 in the OEIS)

If k | n then $\pi_n \geqslant \pi_k +1$ except for $\pi_6 = \pi_3 =1.$
If k = 1, and n is an odd prime, then 1 | p and $\pi_p \geqslant \pi_1 +1 = 1.$

n	0	1	2	3	4	5	6	7	8	9	10	11	12	13	14	15	16	17	18	19	20	21	22	23	24	25
F_{n}	0	1	1	2	3	5	8	13	21	34	55	89	144	233	377	610	987	1597	2584	4181	6765	10946	17711	28657	46368	75025
π_{n}	0	0	0	1	1	1	1	1	2	2	2	1	2	1	2	3	3	1	3	2	4	3	2	1	4	2

The first step in finding the characteristic quotient of any F_{n} is to divide out the prime factors of all earlier Fibonacci numbers F_{k} for which k | n.

The exact quotients left over are prime factors that have not yet appeared.

If p and q are both primes, then all factors of F_{pq} are characteristic, except for those of F_{p} and F_{q}.

$$\begin{align}
\gcd (F_{pq}, F_q ) &= F_{\gcd(pq, q)} = F_q \\
\gcd (F_{pq}, F_p ) &= F_{\gcd(pq, p)} = F_p
\end{align}$$

Therefore:

$$\pi_{pq} \geqslant \begin{cases} \pi_p + \pi_q + 1 & p\neq q \\ \pi_p + 1 & p = q \end{cases}$$

The number of distinct prime factors of the Fibonacci numbers with a prime index is directly relevant to the counting function. (sequence A080345 in the OEIS)

p	2	3	5	7	11	13	17	19	23	29	31	37	41	43	47	53	59	61	67	71	73	79	83	89	97
π_{p}	0	1	1	1	1	1	1	2	1	1	2	3	2	1	1	2	2	2	3	2	2	2	1	2	4

== Rank of apparition ==
For a prime p, the smallest index u > 0 such that F_{u} is divisible by p is called the rank of apparition (sometimes called Fibonacci entry point) of p and denoted a(p). The rank of apparition a(p) is defined for every prime p. The rank of apparition divides the Pisano period π(p) and allows to determine all Fibonacci numbers divisible by p.

For the divisibility of Fibonacci numbers by powers of a prime, $p \geqslant 3, n \geqslant 2$ and $k \geqslant 0$

$$p^n \mid F_{a(p)kp^{n-1}}.$$

In particular

$$p^2 \mid F_{a(p)p}.$$

== Wall–Sun–Sun primes ==
A prime p ≠ 2, 5 is called a Fibonacci–Wieferich prime or a Wall–Sun–Sun prime if $p^2 \mid F_q,$ where

$$q = p - \left(\frac{{p}}{{5}}\right)$$

and $\left(\tfrac{{p}}{{5}}\right)$ is the Legendre symbol:

$$\left(\frac{p}{5}\right) = \begin{cases} 1 & p \equiv \pm 1 \bmod 5\\ -1 & p \equiv \pm 2 \bmod 5 \end{cases}$$

It is known that for p ≠ 2, 5, a(p) is a divisor of:

$$p-\left(\frac{{p}}{{5}}\right) = \begin{cases} p-1 & p \equiv \pm 1 \bmod 5\\ p+1 & p \equiv \pm 2 \bmod 5 \end{cases}$$

For every prime p that is not a Wall–Sun–Sun prime, $a(p^2) = p a(p)$ as illustrated in the table below:

p	2	3	5	7	11	13	17	19	23	29	31	37	41	43	47	53	59	61
a(p)	3	4	5	8	10	7	9	18	24	14	30	19	20	44	16	27	58	15
a(p^{2})	6	12	25	56	110	91	153	342	552	406	930	703	820	1892	752	1431	3422	915

The existence of Wall–Sun–Sun primes is conjectural.

== Fibonacci primitive part ==
Because $F_a | F_{ab}$, we can divide any Fibonacci number $F_n$ by the least common multiple of all $F_d$ where $d | n$. The result is called the primitive part of $F_n$. The primitive parts of the Fibonacci numbers are

1, 1, 2, 3, 5, 4, 13, 7, 17, 11, 89, 6, 233, 29, 61, 47, 1597, 19, 4181, 41, 421, 199, 28657, 46, 15005, 521, 5777, 281, 514229, 31, 1346269, 2207, 19801, 3571, 141961, 321, 24157817, 9349, 135721, 2161, 165580141, 211, 433494437, 13201, 109441, ... (sequence A061446 in the OEIS)

Any primes that divide $F_n$ and not any of the $F_d$s are called primitive prime factors of $F_n$. The product of the primitive prime factors of the Fibonacci numbers are

1, 1, 2, 3, 5, 1, 13, 7, 17, 11, 89, 1, 233, 29, 61, 47, 1597, 19, 4181, 41, 421, 199, 28657, 23, 3001, 521, 5777, 281, 514229, 31, 1346269, 2207, 19801, 3571, 141961, 107, 24157817, 9349, 135721, 2161, 165580141, 211, 433494437, 13201, 109441, 64079, 2971215073, 1103, 598364773, 15251, ... (sequence A178763 in the OEIS)

The first case of more than one primitive prime factor is 4181 = 37 × 113 for $F_{19}$.

The primitive part has a non-primitive prime factor in some cases. The ratio between the two above sequences is

1, 1, 1, 1, 1, 4, 1, 1, 1, 1, 1, 3, 1, 1, 1, 1, 1, 1, 1, 1, 1, 1, 1, 2, 5, 1, 1, 1, 1, 1, 1, 1, 1, 1, 1, 3, 1, 1, 1, 1, 1, 1, 1, 1, 1, 1, 1, 2, 1, 1, 1, 1, 1, 1, 1, 7, 1, 1, 1, 1, 1, 1, 1, 1, 1, 1, 1, 1, 1, 1, 1, 1, 1, 1, 1, 1, 1, 1, 1, 1, 1, 1, 1, 1, 1, 1, 1, 1, 1, 1, 13, 1, 1, .... (sequence A178764 in the OEIS)

The natural numbers n for which $F_n$ has exactly one primitive prime factor are

3, 4, 5, 7, 8, 9, 10, 11, 13, 14, 15, 16, 17, 18, 20, 21, 22, 23, 24, 25, 26, 28, 29, 30, 32, 33, 34, 35, 36, 38, 39, 40, 42, 43, 45, 47, 48, 51, 52, 54, 56, 60, 62, 63, 65, 66, 72, 74, 75, 76, 82, 83, 93, 94, 98, 105, 106, 108, 111, 112, 119, 121, 122, 123, 124, 125, 131, 132, 135, 136, 137, 140, 142, 144, 145, ... (sequence A152012 in the OEIS)

For a prime p, p is in this sequence if and only if $F_p$ is a Fibonacci prime, and 2p is in this sequence if and only if $L_p$ is a Lucas prime (where $L_p$ is the $p$th Lucas number). Moreover, 2^{n} is in this sequence if and only if $L_{2^{n-1}}$ is a Lucas prime.

The number of primitive prime factors of $F_n$ are

0, 0, 1, 1, 1, 0, 1, 1, 1, 1, 1, 0, 1, 1, 1, 1, 1, 1, 2, 1, 1, 1, 1, 1, 1, 1, 2, 1, 1, 1, 2, 1, 1, 1, 1, 1, 3, 1, 1, 1, 2, 1, 1, 2, 1, 2, 1, 1, 2, 2, 1, 1, 2, 1, 2, 1, 2, 2, 2, 1, 2, 1, 1, 2, 1, 1, 3, 2, 3, 2, 2, 1, 2, 1, 1, 1, 2, 2, 2, 2, 3, 1, 1, 2, 2, 2, 2, 3, 2, 2, 2, 2, 1, 1, 3, 2, 4, 1, 2, 2, 2, 2, 3, 2, 1, 1, 2, 1, 2, 2, 1, 1, 2, 2, 2, 2, 2, 3, 1, 2, 1, 1, 1, 1, 1, 2, 2, 2, ... (sequence A086597 in the OEIS)

The least primitive prime factors of $F_n$ are

1, 1, 2, 3, 5, 1, 13, 7, 17, 11, 89, 1, 233, 29, 61, 47, 1597, 19, 37, 41, 421, 199, 28657, 23, 3001, 521, 53, 281, 514229, 31, 557, 2207, 19801, 3571, 141961, 107, 73, 9349, 135721, 2161, 2789, 211, 433494437, 43, 109441, 139, 2971215073, 1103, 97, 101, ... (sequence A001578 in the OEIS)

It is conjectured that all the prime factors of $F_n$ are primitive when $n$ is a prime number.

== Fibonacci numbers in prime-like sequences ==
Although it is not known whether there are infinitely many Fibonacci numbers which are prime, Melfi proved that there are infinitely many which are practical numbers, a sequence which resembles the primes in some respects.

== See also ==
- Lucas number
