= Pi function =

In mathematics, at least four different functions are known as the pi or Pi function:

- $\pi(x)\,\!$ (pi function) – the prime-counting function
- $\Pi(x)\,\!$ (Pi function) – the gamma function when offset to coincide with the factorial
- Rectangular function
- $\pi(n)\,\!$ – the Pisano period

It may also refer to:

- $\prod_{n=1}^{\infty}$ – the Infinite product of a sequence
- Capital pi notation
