= Wilson quotient =

The Wilson quotient W(p) is defined as:

$$W(p) = \frac{(p-1)! + 1}{p}$$

If p is a prime number, the quotient is an integer by Wilson's theorem; moreover, if p is composite, the quotient is not an integer. If p divides W(p), it is called a Wilson prime. The integer values of W(p) are (sequence A007619 in the OEIS):

W(2) = 1
W(3) = 1
W(5) = 5
W(7) = 103
W(11) = 329891
W(13) = 36846277
W(17) = 1230752346353
W(19) = 336967037143579
...

It is known that

$$W(p)\equiv B_{2(p-1)}-B_{p-1}\pmod{p},$$
$$p-1+ptW(p)\equiv pB_{t(p-1)}\pmod{p^2},$$

where $B_k$ is the k-th Bernoulli number. Note that the first relation comes from the second one by subtraction, after substituting $t=1$ and $t=2$.

== See also ==
- Fermat quotient
