= Wieferich's theorem =

Wieferich's theorem may refer to one of the following results named after Arthur Wieferich:

- Wieferich's criterion for the solubility of the "First Case" of Fermat's Last Theorem
- The solution to Waring's problem for cubes, that every integer is the sum of at most 9 cubes
