= Wall's conjecture =

In mathematics, Wall's conjecture denotes one of the following:

- a conjecture of C. T. C. Wall in group theory stating that every finitely generated group is accessible
- a hypothesis of Donald Dines Wall in number theory on the non-existence of Fibonacci-Wieferich primes
