= Regular prime =

Type of prime number

Unsolved problem in mathematics
Are there infinitely many regular primes, and if so, is their relative density $e^{-1/2}$?
More unsolved problems in mathematics

In number theory, a regular prime is a special kind of prime number, defined by Ernst Kummer in 1850 to prove certain cases of Fermat's Last Theorem. Regular primes may be defined via the divisibility of either class numbers or of Bernoulli numbers.

The first few regular odd primes are:

3, 5, 7, 11, 13, 17, 19, 23, 29, 31, 41, 43, 47, 53, 61, 71, 73, 79, 83, 89, 97, 107, 109, 113, 127, 137, 139, 151, 163, 167, 173, 179, 181, 191, 193, 197, 199, ... (sequence A007703 in the OEIS).

== History and motivation ==
In 1850, Kummer proved that Fermat's Last Theorem is true for a prime exponent $p$ if $p$ is regular. This focused attention on the irregular primes. In 1852, Genocchi was able to prove that the first case of Fermat's Last Theorem is true for an exponent $p$, if $(p,p-3)$ is not an irregular pair. Kummer improved this further in 1857 by showing that for the "first case" of Fermat's Last Theorem (see Sophie Germain's theorem) it is sufficient to establish that either $(p,p-3)$ or $(p,p-5)$ fails to be an irregular pair. (As applied in these results, $(p,2k)$ is an irregular pair when $p$ is irregular due to a certain condition, described below, being realized at $2k$.)

Kummer found the irregular primes smaller than 165. In 1963, Lehmer reported results up to 10000 and Selfridge and Pollack announced in 1964 to have completed the table of irregular primes up to 25000. Although the two latter tables did not appear in print, Johnson found that $(p,p-3)$ is in fact an irregular pair for $p=16843$ and that this is the first and only time this occurs for $p<30000$. It was found in 1993 that the next time this happens is for $p=2124679$; see Wolstenholme prime.

== Definition ==
=== Class number criterion ===
An odd prime number $p$ is defined to be regular if it does not divide the class number of the $p$th cyclotomic field $\Q(\zeta_p)$, where $\zeta_p$ is a primitive $p$th root of unity.

The prime number 2 is often considered regular as well.

The class number of the cyclotomic field is the number of ideals of the ring of integers $\Z(\zeta_p)$ up to equivalence. Two ideals $I$ and $J$ are considered equivalent if there is a nonzero $u$ in $\Q(\zeta_p)$ so that $I=uJ$. The first few of these class numbers are listed in (sequence A000927 in the OEIS).

=== Kummer's criterion ===
Ernst Kummer (Kummer 1850) showed that an equivalent criterion for regularity is that $p$ does not divide the numerator of any of the Bernoulli numbers $B_k$ for $k=2,4,6,\dots,p-3$.

Kummer's proof that this is equivalent to the class number definition is strengthened by the Herbrand–Ribet theorem, which states certain consequences of $p$ dividing the numerator of one of these Bernoulli numbers.

== Siegel's conjecture ==
It has been conjectured that there are infinitely many regular primes. More precisely Carl Ludwig Siegel conjectured that $e^{-1/2}$, or about 60.65%, of all prime numbers are regular, in the asymptotic sense of natural density. Here, $e\approx 2.718$ is the base of the natural logarithm.

Taking Kummer's criterion, the chance that one numerator of the Bernoulli numbers $B_k$, $k=2,\dots,p-3$, is not divisible by the prime $p$ is

$$\dfrac{p-1}{p}$$

so that the chance that none of the numerators of these Bernoulli numbers are divisible by the prime $p$ is

$$\left(\dfrac{p-1}{p}\right)^{\dfrac{p-3}{2}}=\left(1-\dfrac{1}{p}\right)^{\dfrac{p-3}{2}}=\left(1-\dfrac{1}{p}\right)^{-3/2}\cdot\left\lbrace\left(1-\dfrac{1}{p}\right)^{p}\right\rbrace^{1/2}.$$

By the definition of $e$,
$$\lim_{p\to\infty}\left(1-\dfrac{1}{p}\right)^{p}=\dfrac{1}{e}$$
giving the probability
$$\lim_{p\to\infty}\left(1-\dfrac{1}{p}\right)^{-3/2}\cdot\left\lbrace\left(1-\dfrac{1}{p}\right)^{p}\right\rbrace^{1/2}=e^{-1/2}\approx0.606531.$$

It follows that about $60.6531\%$ of the primes are regular by chance. Hart et al. indicate that $60.6590\%$ of the primes less than $2^{31}=2,147,483,648$ are regular.

== Irregular primes ==
An odd prime that is not regular is an irregular prime (or Bernoulli irregular or B-irregular to distinguish from other types of irregularity discussed below). The first few irregular primes are:

37, 59, 67, 101, 103, 131, 149, 157, 233, 257, 263, 271, 283, 293, 307, 311, 347, 353, 379, 389, 401, 409, 421, 433, 461, 463, 467, 491, 523, 541, 547, 557, 577, 587, 593, ... (sequence A000928 in the OEIS)

=== Infinitude ===
K. L. Jensen (a student of Niels Nielsen) proved in 1915 that there are infinitely many irregular primes of the form $4n+3$. In 1954 Carlitz gave a simple proof of the weaker result that there are in general infinitely many irregular primes.

Metsänkylä proved in 1971 that for any integer $T>6$, there are infinitely many irregular primes not of the form $mT\pm1$, and later generalized this.

=== Irregular pairs ===
If $p$ is an irregular prime and $p$ divides the numerator of the Bernoulli number $B_{2k}$ for $0<2k<p-1$, then $(p,2k)$ is called an irregular pair. In other words, an irregular pair is a bookkeeping device to record, for an irregular prime $p$, the particular indices of the Bernoulli numbers at which regularity fails. The first few irregular pairs (when ordered by $k$) are:

(691, 12), (3617, 16), (43867, 18), (283, 20), (617, 20), (131, 22), (593, 22), (103, 24), (2294797, 24), (657931, 26), (9349, 28), (362903, 28), ... (sequence A189683 in the OEIS).

The smallest even $k$ such that $n$th irregular prime divides $B_{2k}$ are

32, 44, 58, 68, 24, 22, 130, 62, 84, 164, 100, 84, 20, 156, 88, 292, 280, 186, 100, 200, 382, 126, 240, 366, 196, 130, 94, 292, 400, 86, 270, 222, 52, 90, 22, ... (sequence A035112 in the OEIS).

For a given prime $p$, the number of such pairs is called the index of irregularity of $p$. Hence, a prime is regular if and only if its index of irregularity is zero. Similarly, a prime is irregular if and only if its index of irregularity is positive.

It was discovered that $(p,p-3)$ is in fact an irregular pair for $p=16843$, as well as for $p=2124679$.. There are no more occurrences for $p<10^9$.

=== Irregular index ===
An odd prime $p$ has irregular index $n$ if and only if there are $n$ values of $k$ for which $p$ divides $B_{2k}$ and these $k$s are less than $(p-1)/2$. The first irregular prime with irregular index greater than 1 is 157, which divides $B_{62}$ and $B_{110}$, so it has an irregular index 2. Clearly, the irregular index of a regular prime is 0.

The irregular index of the $n$th prime starting with $n=2$, or the prime 3 is

0, 0, 0, 0, 0, 0, 0, 0, 0, 0, 1, 0, 0, 0, 0, 1, 0, 1, 0, 0, 0, 0, 0, 0, 1, 1, 0, 0, 0, 0, 1, 0, 0, 1, 0, 2, 0, 0, 0, 0, 0, 0, 0, 0, 0, 0, 0, 0, 0, 1, 0, 0, 0, 1, 1, 0, 1, 0, 0, 1, 1, 1, 1, 0, 0, 0, 0, 1, 0, 2, 0, ... (sequence A091888 in the OEIS).

The irregular index of the $n$th irregular prime is

1, 1, 1, 1, 1, 1, 1, 2, 1, 1, 1, 1, 1, 1, 1, 1, 1, 2, 2, 1, 1, 1, 1, 1, 1, 1, 2, 3, 1, 1, 2, 1, 1, 2, 1, 1, 1, 3, 1, 2, 3, 1, 1, 2, 1, 1, 2, 1, 1, 1, 1, 1, 1, 2, 1, 1, 1, 1, 1, 1, 1, 2, 1, 1, 1, 1, 1, 1, 3, 1, 1, 1, ... (sequence A091887 in the OEIS).

The primes having irregular index 1 are

37, 59, 67, 101, 103, 131, 149, 233, 257, 263, 271, 283, 293, 307, 311, 347, 389, 401, 409, 421, 433, 461, 463, 523, 541, 557, 577, 593, 607, 613, 619, 653, 659, 677, 683, 727, 751, 757, 761, 773, 797, 811, 821, 827, 839, 877, 881, 887, 953, 971, ... (sequence A073276 in the OEIS).

The primes having irregular index 2 are

157, 353, 379, 467, 547, 587, 631, 673, 691, 809, 929, 1291, 1297, 1307, 1663, 1669, 1733, 1789, 1933, 1997, 2003, 2087, 2273, 2309, 2371, 2383, 2423, 2441, 2591, 2671, 2789, 2909, 2957, ... (sequence A073277 in the OEIS).

The primes having irregular index 3 are

491, 617, 647, 1151, 1217, 1811, 1847, 2939, 3833, 4003, 4657, 4951, 6763, 7687, 8831, 9011, 10463, 10589, 12073, 13217, 14533, 14737, 14957, 15287, 15787, 15823, 16007, 17681, 17863, 18713, 18869, ... (sequence A060975 in the OEIS).

The least primes having irregular index $n$ are

2, 3, 37, 157, 491, 12613, 78233, 527377, 3238481, ... (sequence A061576 in the OEIS).

(This sequence defines "the irregular index of 2" as −1, and also starts at $n=-1$.)

== Generalizations ==
=== Euler irregular primes ===
Similarly, we can define an Euler irregular prime (or E-irregular) as a prime $p$ that divides at least one Euler number $E_{2n}$ with $0<2n\le p-3$. The first few Euler irregular primes are

19, 31, 43, 47, 61, 67, 71, 79, 101, 137, 139, 149, 193, 223, 241, 251, 263, 277, 307, 311, 349, 353, 359, 373, 379, 419, 433, 461, 463, 491, 509, 541, 563, 571, 577, 587, ... (sequence A120337 in the OEIS).

The Euler irregular pairs are

(61, 6), (277, 8), (19, 10), (2659, 10), (43, 12), (967, 12), (47, 14), (4241723, 14), (228135437, 16), (79, 18), (349, 18), (84224971, 18), (41737, 20), (354957173, 20), (31, 22), (1567103, 22), (1427513357, 22), (2137, 24), (111691689741601, 24), (67, 26), (61001082228255580483, 26), (71, 28), (30211, 28), (2717447, 28), (77980901, 28), ... .

Vandiver proved in 1940 that Fermat's Last Theorem (that $x^p+y^p=z^p$ has no solution for integers $x$, $y$, $z$ with $\gcd(xyz,p)=1$) is true for prime exponents $p$ that are Euler-regular. Gut proved that $x^{2p}+y^{2p}=z^{2p}$ has no solution if $p$ has an E-irregularity index less than 5.

== See also ==
- Wolstenholme prime
