= Table of congruences =

In number theory, a congruence is an equivalence relation on the integers. The following sections list important or interesting prime-related congruences.

== Table of congruences characterizing special primes ==
Congruence	Explanation	Known examples
$2^{p-1} \equiv 1 \pmod{p}$	special case of Fermat's little theorem, satisfied by all odd prime numbers	
$2^{p-1} \equiv 1 \pmod{p^2}$	solutions are called Wieferich primes	1093, 3511 (OEIS: A001220)
$F_{n - \left(\frac{{n}}{{5}}\right)} \equiv 0 \pmod{n}$	satisfied by all prime numbers	
$F_{p - \left(\frac{{p}}{{5}}\right)} \equiv 0 \pmod{p^2}$	solutions are called Wall–Sun–Sun primes	no examples known
${2n-1 \choose n-1} \equiv 1 \pmod{n^3}$	by Wolstenholme's theorem satisfied by all prime numbers greater than 3	
${2p-1 \choose p-1} \equiv 1 \pmod{p^4},$	solutions are called Wolstenholme primes	16843, 2124679 (OEIS: A088164)
$(n-1)!\ \equiv\ -1 \pmod n$	by Wilson's theorem a natural number n is prime if and only if it satisfies this congruence	
$(p-1)!\ \equiv\ -1 \pmod{p^2}$	solutions are called Wilson primes	5, 13, 563 (OEIS: A007540)
$4[(p-1)!+1]\ \equiv\ -p \pmod{p(p+2)}$	solutions are the twin primes	

== Other prime-related congruences ==
There are other prime-related congruences that provide necessary and sufficient conditions on the primality of certain subsequences of the natural numbers. Many of these alternate statements characterizing primality are related to Wilson's theorem, or are restatements of this classical result given in terms of other special variants of generalized factorial functions. For instance, new variants of Wilson's theorem stated in terms of the hyperfactorials, subfactorials, and superfactorials are given in.

=== Variants of Wilson's theorem ===
For integers $k \geq 1$, we have the following form of Wilson's theorem:

$$(k-1)! (p-k)! \equiv (-1)^k \pmod{p} \iff p \text{ prime. }$$

If $p$ is odd, we have that

$$\left(\frac{p-1}{2}\right)!^2 \equiv (-1)^{(p+1)/2} \pmod{p} \iff p \text{ an odd prime. }$$

=== Clement's theorem concerning the twin primes ===
Clement's congruence-based theorem characterizes the twin primes pairs of the form $(p, p+2)$ through the following conditions:

$$4[(p-1)!+1] \equiv -p \pmod{p(p+2)} \iff p,p+2 \text{ are both prime. }$$

P. A. Clement's original 1949 paper provides a proof of this interesting elementary number theoretic criteria for twin primality based on Wilson's theorem. Another characterization given in Lin and Zhipeng's article provides that

$$2 \left(\frac{p-1}{2}\right)!^2 + (-1)^{\frac{p-1}{2}} (5p+2) \equiv 0 \iff  p,p+2 \text{ are both prime. }$$

=== Characterizations of prime tuples and clusters ===
The prime pairs of the form $(p, p+2k)$ for some $k \geq 1$ include the special cases of the cousin primes (when $k=2$) and the sexy primes (when $k=3$). We have elementary congruence-based characterizations of the primality of such pairs, proved for instance in the article. Examples of congruences characterizing these prime pairs include

$$2k (2k)![(p-1)!+1] \equiv [1-(2k)!]p \pmod{p(p+2k)} \iff p,p+2k \text{ are both prime, }$$

and the alternate characterization when $p$ is odd such that $p \not{\mid} (2k-1)!!^2$ given by

$$2k(2k-1)!!^2 \left(\frac{p-1}{2}\right)!^2 + (-1)^{\frac{p-1}{2}}\left[(2k-1)!!^2(p+2k)-(-4)^k \cdot p\right] \equiv 0 \iff p,p+2k \text{ are both prime. }$$

Still other congruence-based characterizations of the primality of triples, and more general prime clusters (or prime tuples) exist and are typically proved starting from Wilson's theorem.).
