= Wolstenholme number =

Number that is the numerator of the generalized harmonic number H_(n,2)

In mathematics, a Wolstenholme number is a number that is the numerator of the generalized harmonic number H_{n,2}.

The first such numbers are 1, 5, 49, 205, 5269, 5369, 266681, 1077749, ... (sequence A007406 in the OEIS).

These numbers are named after Joseph Wolstenholme, who proved Wolstenholme's theorem on modular relations of the generalized harmonic numbers.
