= John Wilson (English judge) =

English mathematician (1741–1793)

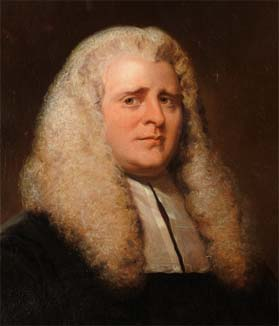
- Born: 6 August 1741; Applethwaite, Westmorland, England
- Died: 18 October 1793 (aged 52); Kendal, Westmorland, England

Sir John Wilson (6 August 1741, Applethwaite, Westmorland – 18 October 1793, Kendal, Westmorland) was an English mathematician and judge. Wilson's theorem is named after him.

Wilson attended school in Staveley, Cumbria before going up to Peterhouse, Cambridge in 1757, where he was a student of Edward Waring. He was Senior Wrangler in 1761. He was later knighted, and became a Fellow of the Royal Society in 1782. He was Judge of Common Pleas from 1786 until his death in 1793.

== See also ==
- Wilson prime
