= Waring's prime number conjecture =

In number theory, Waring's prime number conjecture is a conjecture related to Vinogradov's theorem, named after the English mathematician Edward Waring. It states that every odd number exceeding 3 is either a prime number or the sum of three prime numbers. It follows from the generalized Riemann hypothesis, and (trivially) from Goldbach's weak conjecture.

== See also ==
- Schnirelmann's constant
