= Sun's curious identity =

Identity involving binomial coefficients, first established by Zhi-Wei Sun in 2002

In combinatorics, Sun's curious identity is the following identity involving binomial coefficients, first established by Zhi-Wei Sun in 2002:

$$(x+m+1)\sum_{i=0}^m(-1)^i\dbinom{x+y+i}{m-i}\dbinom{y+2i}{i}
-\sum_{i=0}^{m}\dbinom{x+i}{m-i}(-4)^i=(x-m)\dbinom{x}{m}.$$

== Proofs ==
After Sun's publication of this identity in 2002, five other proofs were obtained by various mathematicians:

- Panholzer and Prodinger's proof via generating functions;
- Merlini and Sprugnoli's proof using Riordan arrays;
- Ekhad and Mohammed's proof by the WZ method;
- Chu and Claudio's proof with the help of Jensen's formula;
- Callan's combinatorial proof involving dominos and colorings.
