= Arthur Wieferich =

German number theorist (1884–1954)

- Born: April 27, 1884; Münster, Westphalia, German Empire
- Died: September 15, 1954 (aged 70); Meppen, West Germany
- Education: University of Münster
- Known for: Wieferich prime Wieferich pair Wieferich's theorem
- Scientific career
- Fields: Mathematics
- Academic advisors: Max Dehn

Arthur Josef Alwin Wieferich (April 27, 1884 – September 15, 1954) was a German mathematician and teacher, remembered for his work on number theory, as exemplified by a type of prime numbers named after him.

He was born in Münster, attended the University of Münster (1903–1909) and then worked as a school teacher and tutor until his retirement in 1949. He married in 1916 and had no children.

Wieferich abandoned his studies after his graduation and did not publish any paper after 1909. His mathematical reputation is founded on five papers he published while a student at Münster:

- Wieferich, Arthur (1908), "Beweis des Satzes, daß sich eine jede ganze Zahl als Summe von höchstens neun positiven Kuben darstellen läßt", Mathematische Annalen, 66 (1): 95–101, doi:10.1007/BF01450913, S2CID 121386035.
- Wieferich, Arthur (1908), "Über die Darstellung der Zahlen als Summen von Biquadraten", Mathematische Annalen, 66 (1): 106–108, doi:10.1007/BF01450915, S2CID 119483487.
- "Zur Darstellung der Zahlen als Summen von fünften und siebenten Potenzen positiver ganzer Zahlen", Mathematische Annalen, 67 (1): 61–75, 1909, doi:10.1007/BF01451870, S2CID 121732068.
- Wieferich, Arthur (1909), "Zum letzten Fermat'schen Theorem", Journal für die reine und angewandte Mathematik, 136 (3/4): 293–302, doi:10.1515/crll.1909.136.293, S2CID 118715277.
- Wieferich, Arthur (1909), "Zur Dreiecksgeometrie", Journal für die reine und angewandte Mathematik, 136 (3/4): 303–305, doi:10.1515/crll.1909.136.303, S2CID 199546790.

The first three papers are related to Waring's problem. His fourth paper led to the term Wieferich prime, which are p such that p^2 divides 2^(p-1) - 1.

== See also ==
- Wieferich pair
- Wieferich's theorem
- Wieferich prime
