= Wilson's theorem =

Theorem on prime numbers

In algebra and number theory, Wilson's theorem states that a natural number n > 1 is a prime number if and only if the product of all the positive integers less than n is one less than a multiple of n. That is (using the notations of modular arithmetic), the factorial $(n - 1)! = 1 \times 2 \times 3 \times \cdots \times (n - 1)$ satisfies

$$(n-1)!\ \equiv\; -1 \pmod n$$

exactly when n is a prime number. In other words, any integer n > 1 is a prime number if, and only if, (n − 1)! + 1 is divisible by n.

== History ==
The theorem was first stated by Ibn al-Haytham c. 1000 AD. Edward Waring announced the theorem in 1770 without proving it, crediting his student John Wilson for the discovery. Lagrange gave the first proof in 1771. There is evidence that Leibniz was also aware of the result a century earlier, but never published it.

== Example ==
For each of the values of n from 2 to 30, the following table shows the number (n − 1)! and the remainder when (n − 1)! is divided by n. (In the notation of modular arithmetic, the remainder when m is divided by n is written m mod n.) As expected, $(n-1)!\ \equiv n-1\bmod\ n$ when n is prime. The background color is blue for prime values of n, gold for composite values.

Table of factorial and its remainder modulo n
$n$	$(n-1)!$ (sequence A000142 in the OEIS)	$(n-1)!\ \bmod\ n$ (sequence A061006 in the OEIS)
2	1	1
3	2	2
4	6	2
5	24	4
6	120	0
7	720	6
8	5040	0
9	40320	0
10	362880	0
11	3628800	10
12	39916800	0
13	479001600	12
14	6227020800	0
15	87178291200	0
16	1307674368000	0
17	20922789888000	16
18	355687428096000	0
19	6402373705728000	18
20	121645100408832000	0
21	2432902008176640000	0
22	51090942171709440000	0
23	1124000727777607680000	22
24	25852016738884976640000	0
25	620448401733239439360000	0
26	15511210043330985984000000	0
27	403291461126605635584000000	0
28	10888869450418352160768000000	0
29	304888344611713860501504000000	28
30	8841761993739701954543616000000	0

== Proofs ==
As a biconditional (if and only if) statement, the proof has two halves: to show that equality does not hold when $n$ is composite, and to show that it does hold when $n$ is prime.

=== Composite modulus ===
Suppose that $n$ is composite. Therefore, it is divisible by some prime number $q$ where $2 \leq q < n$. Because $q$ divides $n$, there is an integer $k$ such that $n = qk$. Suppose for the sake of contradiction that $(n-1)!$ were congruent to $-1$ modulo ${n}$. Then $(n-1)!$ would also be congruent to $-1$ modulo ${q}$: indeed, if $(n-1)! \equiv -1 \pmod{n}$ then $(n-1)! = nm - 1 = (qk)m - 1 = q(km) - 1$ for some integer $m$, and consequently $(n-1)!$ is one less than a multiple of $q$. On the other hand, since $2 \leq q \leq n - 1$, one of the factors in the expanded product $(n - 1)! = (n - 1) \times (n - 2) \times \cdots \times 2 \times 1$ is $q$. Therefore $(n - 1)! \equiv 0 \pmod{q}$. This is a contradiction; therefore it is not possible that $(n - 1)! \equiv -1\pmod{n}$ when $n$ is composite.

In fact, more is true. With the sole exception of the case $n = 4$, where $3! = 6 \equiv 2 \pmod{4}$, if $n$ is composite then $(n - 1)!$ is congruent to 0 modulo $n$. The proof can be divided into two cases: First, if $n$ can be factored as the product of two unequal numbers, $n = ab$, where $2 \leq a < b < n$, then both $a$ and $b$ will appear as factors in the product $(n - 1)! = (n - 1)\times (n - 2) \times \cdots \times 2 \times 1$ and so $(n - 1)!$ is divisible by $ab = n$. If $n$ has no such factorization, then it must be the square of some prime $q$ larger than 2. But then $2q < q^2 = n$, so both $q$ and $2q$ will be factors of $(n-1)!$, and so $n$ divides $(n-1)!$ in this case, as well.

=== Prime modulus ===
The first two proofs below use the fact that the residue classes modulo a prime number form a finite field (specifically, a prime field).

==== Elementary proof ====
The result is trivial when $p = 2$, so assume $p$ is an odd prime, $p \geq 3$. Since the residue classes modulo $p$ form a field, every non-zero residue $a$ has a unique multiplicative inverse $a^{-1}$. Euclid's lemma implies (Note: Because if $a \equiv a^{-1} \pmod{p}$ then $a^2 -1 \equiv 0 \pmod{p}$, and if the prime $p$ divides $a^2 - 1 = (a - 1)(a + 1)$, then by Euclid's lemma it divides either $a - 1$ or $a + 1$.) that the only values of $a$ for which $a \equiv a^{-1}\pmod{p}$ are $a \equiv \pm 1 \pmod{p}$. Therefore, with the exception of $\pm 1$, the factors in the expanded form of $(p - 1)!$ can be arranged in disjoint pairs such that product of each pair is congruent to 1 modulo $p$. This proves Wilson's theorem.

For example, for $p = 11$, one has
$$10! = [(1\cdot10)]\cdot[(2\cdot6)(3\cdot4)(5\cdot9)(7\cdot8)]  \equiv [-1]\cdot[1\cdot1\cdot1\cdot1]  \equiv -1 \pmod{11}.$$

==== Proof using Fermat's little theorem ====
Again, the result is trivial for p = 2, so suppose p is an odd prime, p ≥ 3. Consider the polynomial

$$g(x)=(x-1)(x-2) \cdots (x-(p-1)).$$

g has degree p − 1, leading term x^{p − 1}, and constant term (p − 1)!. Its p − 1 roots are 1, 2, ..., p − 1.

Now consider

$$h(x)=x^{p-1}-1.$$

h also has degree p − 1 and leading term x^{p − 1}. Modulo p, Fermat's little theorem says it also has the same p − 1 roots, 1, 2, ..., p − 1.

Finally, consider

$$f(x)=g(x)-h(x).$$

f has degree at most p − 2 (since the leading terms cancel), and modulo p also has the p − 1 roots 1, 2, ..., p − 1. But Lagrange's theorem says it cannot have more than p − 2 roots. Therefore, f must be identically zero (mod p), so its constant term is (p − 1)! + 1 ≡ 0 (mod p). This is Wilson's theorem.

==== Proof using elementary Group Theory ====
Let p be an odd prime. Let $\mathbb{F}_p^\times$ denote the multiplicative group of integers modulo p, such that $(p-1)! \equiv \prod_{x \in \mathbb{F}_p^\times} x \mod p$. Since $\mathbb{F}_p^\times$ is cyclic, there exists a group isomorphism $\varphi: \mathbb{F}_p^\times \to \mathbb{Z}_{p-1}$, where $\mathbb{Z}_{p-1}$ is the additive group of integers modulo p - 1. Therefore:

$$\varphi\!\left(\prod_{x \in \mathbb{F}_p^\times} x\right) = \sum_{x \in \mathbb{F}_p^\times} \varphi(x) = \sum_{n \in \mathbb{Z}_{p-1}} n \equiv \frac{p(p-1)}{2} \mod (p-1)$$

Since p was an odd prime, $\frac{p(p-1)}{2}$ has order 2 inside $\mathbb{Z}_{p-1}$. Since isomorphisms preserve the orders of elements, it follows that $\varphi^{-1}\!\left(\frac{p(p-1)}{2}\right) = \prod_{x \in \mathbb{F}_p^\times} x$ also has order exactly 2. The only such element in $\mathbb{F}_p^\times$ is $p - 1$.

==== Proof using the Sylow theorems ====
It is possible to deduce Wilson's theorem from a particular application of the Sylow theorems. Let p be a prime. It is immediate to deduce that the symmetric group $S_p$ has exactly $(p-1)!$ elements of order p, namely the p-cycles $C_p$. On the other hand, each Sylow p-subgroup in $S_p$ is a copy of $C_p$. Hence it follows that the number of Sylow p-subgroups is $n_p=(p-2)!$. The third Sylow theorem implies

$$(p-2)! \equiv 1 \pmod p.$$

Multiplying both sides by (p − 1) gives

$$(p-1)! \equiv p-1 \equiv -1 \pmod p,$$

that is, the result.

== Applications ==
=== Primality tests ===
In practice, Wilson's theorem is useless as a primality test because computing (n − 1)! modulo n for large n is computationally complex.

=== Quadratic residues ===
Using Wilson's Theorem, for any odd prime p = 2m + 1, we can rearrange the left hand side of
$$1\cdot 2\cdots (p-1)\ \equiv\ -1\ \pmod{p}$$
to obtain the equality
$$1\cdot(p-1)\cdot 2\cdot (p-2)\cdots m\cdot (p-m)\ \equiv\ 1\cdot (-1)\cdot 2\cdot (-2)\cdots m\cdot (-m)\ \equiv\  -1 \pmod{p}.$$
This becomes
$$\prod_{j=1}^m\ j^2\ \equiv(-1)^{m+1} \pmod{p}$$
or
$$(m!)^2 \equiv(-1)^{m+1} \pmod{p}.$$
We can use this fact to prove part of a famous result: for any prime p such that p ≡ 1 (mod 4), the number (−1) is a square (quadratic residue) mod p. For this, suppose p = 4k + 1 for some integer k. Then we can take m = 2k above, and we conclude that (m!)^{2} is congruent to (−1) (mod p).

=== Formulas for primes ===
Wilson's theorem has been used to construct formulas for primes, but they are too slow to have practical value.

=== p-adic gamma function ===
Wilson's theorem allows one to define the p-adic gamma function.

== Gauss's generalization ==
Gauss proved that
$$\prod_{k = 1 \atop \gcd(k,m)=1}^{m-1} \!\!k \ \equiv
\begin{cases}
-1      \pmod{m}  & \text{if } m=4,\;p^\alpha,\;2p^\alpha \\
\;\;\,1 \pmod{m}  & \text{otherwise}
\end{cases}$$
where p represents an odd prime and $\alpha$ a positive integer. That is, the product of the positive integers less than m and relatively prime to m is one less than a multiple of m when m is equal to 4, or a power of an odd prime, or twice a power of an odd prime; otherwise, the product is one more than a multiple of m. The values of m for which the product is −1 are precisely the ones where there is a primitive root modulo m.

== See also ==
- Wilson prime
- Table of congruences
- Agoh–Giuga conjecture
