= Zhi-Hong Sun =

Chinese mathematician

Zhi-Hong Sun (Chinese: 孙智宏; pinyin: Sūn Zhìhóng; Wade–Giles: Sun Chihhung, born October 16, 1965) is a Chinese mathematician, working primarily on number theory, combinatorics, and graph theory.

Sun and his twin brother Zhi-Wei Sun proved a theorem about what are now known as the Wall–Sun–Sun primes that guided the search for counterexamples to Fermat's Last Theorem.
