= Joseph Wolstenholme =

British mathematician (1829–1891)

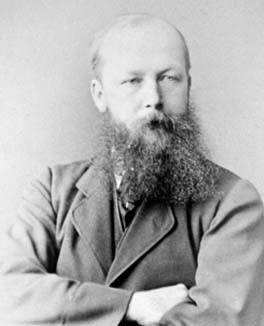
- Born: 30 September 1829; Eccles, Greater Manchester
- Died: 18 November 1891 (aged 62)
- Education: St John's College, Cambridge
- Known for: Wolstenholme primes Wolstenholme's theorem Wolstenholme numbers
- Scientific career
- Fields: Mathematics
- Workplaces: Royal Indian Engineering College

Joseph Wolstenholme (30 September 1829 – 18 November 1891) was an English mathematician.

Wolstenholme was born in Eccles near Salford, Lancashire, England, the son of a Methodist minister, Joseph Wolstenholme, and his wife, Elizabeth, née Clarke. He graduated from St John's College, Cambridge as Third Wrangler in 1850 and was elected a fellow of Christ's College in 1852. Collaborating with Percival Frost, a Treatise on Solid Geometry was published in 1863.

Wolstenholme served as Examiner in 1854, 1856, and 1863 for Cambridge Mathematical Tripos, and according to Andrew Forsyth his book Mathematical Problems made a significant contribution to mathematical education:

...gathered together from many examination papers to form a volume, which was considerably amplified in later editions, they exercised a very real influence upon successive generations of undergraduates; and "Wolstenholme's Problems" have proved a help and stimulus to many students.

In 1869 he resigned his fellowship to marry Térèse Kraus, his Swiss bride. He became a professor of mathematics at the Royal Indian Engineering College at Cooper's Hill, Egham, Surrey from 1871 to 1889. In 1878 he published an expanded version of Mathematical Problems, and in 1888 Examples for Practice in the Use of Seven-figure Logarithms.

He was a close friend of Leslie Stephen from his undergraduate studies at Cambridge. Virginia Woolf used his personality for the character Augustus Carmichael in her novel To the Lighthouse. His sister was the feminist Elizabeth Clarke Wolstenholme Elmy.
