= Zhi-Wei Sun =

Chinese mathematician

Zhi-Wei Sun (Chinese: 孙智伟; pinyin: Sūn Zhìwěi; Wade–Giles: Sun Chih-wei, born October 16, 1965) is a Chinese mathematician, working primarily in number theory, combinatorics, and group theory. He is a professor at Nanjing University.

== Biography ==
Zhi-Wei Sun was born in Huai'an, Jiangsu. Sun and his twin brother Sun Zhihong proved a theorem about what are now known as the Wall–Sun–Sun primes.

Sun proved Sun's curious identity in 2002. In 2003, he presented a unified approach to three topics of Paul Erdős in combinatorial number theory: covering systems, restricted sumsets, and zero-sum problems or EGZ Theorem.

With Stephen Redmond, he posed the Redmond–Sun conjecture in 2006.

In 2013, he published a paper containing many conjectures on primes, one of which states that for any positive integer $m$ there are consecutive primes $p_k,\ldots,p_n\ (k<n)$ not exceeding $2m+2.2\sqrt{m}$ such that $m=p_n-p_{n-1}+...+(-1)^{n-k}p_k$, where $p_j$ denotes the $j$-th prime.

He is the Editor-in-Chief of the Journal of Combinatorics and Number Theory.

== Publications ==
- Sun, Zhi-Wei (14 April 2000). "On Hilbert's Tenth Problem and Related Topics" (PDF). maths.nju.edu.cn.
- Sun, Zhi-Wei (2002), "A curious identity involving binomial coefficients" (PDF), INTEGERS: The Electronic Journal of Combinatorial Number Theory, 2: A04
- Sun, Zhi-Wei (2003). "Unification of zero-sum problems, subset sums and covers of Z" (PDF). Electronic Research Announcements. 9: 51–60. Archived from the original (PDF) on 17 March 2007.
- Sun, Zhi-Wei (2013). "On functions taking only prime values". Journal of Number Theory. 133 (8): 2794–2812. arXiv:1202.6589. doi:10.1016/j.jnt.2013.02.003.
