= Wall–Sun–Sun prime =

Type of prime number conjectured to exist

- Named after: Donald Dines Wall, Zhi Hong Sun and Zhi Wei Sun
- Publication year: 1992
- No. of known terms: 0
- Conjectured no. of terms: Infinite

In number theory, a Wall–Sun–Sun prime or Fibonacci–Wieferich prime is a certain kind of prime number which is conjectured to exist, although none are known.

== Definition ==
Let $p$ be a prime number. When each term in the sequence of Fibonacci numbers $F_n$ is reduced modulo $p$ (i.e. subtracted by the largest multiple of $p$ less than it), the result is a periodic sequence. The (minimal) period length of this sequence is called the Pisano period and denoted $\pi(p)$. Since $F_0 = 0$, it follows that p divides $F_{\pi(p)}$. A prime p such that p^{2} divides $F_{\pi(p)}$ is called a Wall–Sun–Sun prime.

Non-Wall–Sun–Sun primes
p	Periodic sequence	$\pi(p)$	$F_{\pi(p)}$	Quotient of $F_{\pi(p)}$/p^{2}
2	0, 1, 1	3	2	0.5
3	0, 1, 1, 2, 0, 2, 2, 1	8	21	2.3̅
5	0, 1, 1, 2, 3, 0, 3, 3, 1, 4, 0, 4, 4, 3, 2, 0, 2, 2, 4, 1	20	6,765	270.6
7	0, 1, 1, 2, 3, 5, 1, 6, 0, 6, 6, 5, 4, 2, 6, 1	16	987	20.1̅4̅2̅8̅5̅7̅
11	0, 1, 1, 2, 3, 5, 8, 2, 10, 1	10	55	0.4̅5̅

A prime $p$ is a Wall–Sun–Sun prime if and only if the quotient of $F_{\pi(p)}$ divided by p^{2} is a natural number.

=== Equivalent definitions ===
If $\alpha(m)$ denotes the rank of apparition modulo $m$ (i.e., $\alpha(m)$ is the smallest positive index such that $m$ divides $F_{\alpha(m)}$), then a Wall–Sun–Sun prime can be equivalently defined as a prime $p$ such that $p^2$ divides $F_{\alpha(p)}$.

For a prime p ≠ 2, 5, the rank of apparition $\alpha(p)$ is known to divide $p - \left(\tfrac{p}{5}\right)$, where the Legendre symbol $\textstyle\left(\frac{p}{5}\right)$ has the values

$$\left(\frac{p}{5}\right) = \begin{cases} 1 &\text{if }p \equiv \pm1 \pmod 5;\\ -1 &\text{if }p \equiv \pm2 \pmod 5.\end{cases}$$

This observation gives rise to an equivalent characterization of Wall–Sun–Sun primes as primes $p$ such that $p^2$ divides the Fibonacci number $F_{p - \left(\frac{p}{5}\right)}$.

A prime $p$ is a Wall–Sun–Sun prime if and only if $\pi(p^2) = \pi(p)$.

A prime $p$ is a Wall–Sun–Sun prime if and only if $L_p \equiv 1 \pmod{p^2}$, where $L_p$ is the $p$-th Lucas number.

McIntosh and Roettger establish several equivalent characterizations of Lucas–Wieferich primes. In particular, let $\epsilon = \left(\tfrac{p}{5}\right)$; then the following are equivalent:

- $F_{p - \epsilon} \equiv 0 \pmod{p^2}$
- $L_{p - \epsilon} \equiv 2\epsilon \pmod{p^4}$
- $L_{p - \epsilon} \equiv 2\epsilon \pmod{p^3}$
- $F_p \equiv \epsilon \pmod{p^2}$
- $L_p \equiv 1 \pmod{p^2}$

== Existence ==
Unsolved problem in mathematics
Are there any Wall–Sun–Sun primes? If yes, are there an infinite number of them?
More unsolved problems in mathematics

In a study of the Pisano period $k(p)$, Donald Dines Wall determined that there are no Wall–Sun–Sun primes less than $10000$. In 1960, he wrote:

The most perplexing problem we have met in this study concerns the hypothesis $k(p^2) \neq k(p)$. We have run a test on digital computer which shows that $k(p^2) \neq k(p)$ for all $p$ up to $10000$; however, we cannot prove that $k(p^2) = k(p)$ is impossible. The question is closely related to another one, "can a number $x$ have the same order mod $p$ and mod $p^2$?", for which rare cases give an affirmative answer (e.g., $x=3, p=11$; $x=2, p=1093$); hence, one might conjecture that equality may hold for some exceptional $p$.

It has since been conjectured that there are infinitely many Wall–Sun–Sun primes.

In 2007, Richard J. McIntosh and Eric L. Roettger showed that if any exist, they must be > 2×10^{14}. Dorais and Klyve extended this range to 9.7×10^{14} without finding such a prime.

In December 2011, another search was started by the PrimeGrid project; however, it was suspended in May 2017. In November 2020, PrimeGrid started another project that searches for Wieferich and Wall–Sun–Sun primes simultaneously. The project ended in December 2022, proving that any Wall–Sun–Sun prime must exceed $2^{64}$ (about $1.8\cdot 10^{19}$).

== History ==
Wall–Sun–Sun primes are named after Donald Dines Wall, Zhi Hong Sun and Zhi Wei Sun; Z. H. Sun and Z. W. Sun showed in 1992 that if the first case of Fermat's Last Theorem was false for a certain prime p, then p would have to be a Wall–Sun–Sun prime. As a result, prior to Wiles's proof of Fermat's Last Theorem, the search for Wall–Sun–Sun primes was also the search for a potential counterexample to this centuries-old conjecture.

== Generalizations ==
A tribonacci–Wieferich prime is a prime p satisfying h(p) = h(p^{2}), where h(m) is the least positive integer k satisfying [T_{k},T_{k+1},T_{k+2}] ≡ [T_{0}, T_{1}, T_{2}] (mod m) and T_{n} denotes the n-th tribonacci number. No tribonacci–Wieferich prime exists below 10^{11}.

A Pell–Wieferich prime is a prime p satisfying p^{2} divides P_{p−1}, when p congruent to 1 or 7 (mod 8), or p^{2} divides P_{p+1}, when p congruent to 3 or 5 (mod 8), where P_{n} denotes the n-th Pell number. For example, 13, 31, and 1546463 are Pell–Wieferich primes, and no others below 10^{9} (sequence A238736 in the OEIS). In fact, Pell–Wieferich primes are 2-Wall–Sun–Sun primes.

=== Near-Wall–Sun–Sun primes ===
A prime p such that $F_{p - \left(\frac{p}{5}\right)} \equiv Ap \pmod{p^2}$ with small |A| is called near-Wall–Sun–Sun prime. Near-Wall–Sun–Sun primes with A = 0 would be Wall–Sun–Sun primes. PrimeGrid recorded cases with |A| ≤ 1000. A dozen cases are known where A = ±1 (sequence A347565 in the OEIS).

=== Wall–Sun–Sun primes with discriminant D ===
Wall–Sun–Sun primes can be considered for the field $Q_{\sqrt{D}}$ with discriminant D. For the conventional Wall–Sun–Sun primes, D = 5. In the general case, a Lucas–Wieferich prime p associated with (P, Q) is a Wieferich prime to base Q and a Wall–Sun–Sun prime with discriminant D = P^{2} − 4Q. In this definition, the prime p should be odd and not divide D.

It is conjectured that for every fundamental discriminant D not equal to 1, there are infinitely many Wall–Sun–Sun primes with discriminant D.

The case of $(P,Q) = (k,-1)$ corresponds to the k-Wall–Sun–Sun primes, for which Wall–Sun–Sun primes represent the special case k = 1. The k-Wall–Sun–Sun primes can be explicitly defined as primes p such that p^{2} divides the k-Fibonacci number $F_k(\pi_k(p))$, where F_{k}(n) = U_{n}(k, −1) is a Lucas sequence of the first kind with discriminant D = k^{2} + 4 and $\pi_k(p)$ is the Pisano period of k-Fibonacci numbers modulo p. For a prime p ≠ 2 and not dividing D, this condition is equivalent to either of the following.

- p^{2} divides $F_k\left(p - \left(\tfrac{D}{p}\right)\right)$, where $\left(\tfrac{D}{p}\right)$ is the Legendre symbol;
- V_{p}(k, −1) ≡ k (mod p^{2}), where V_{n}(k, −1) is a Lucas sequence of the second kind.

The smallest k-Wall–Sun–Sun primes for k = 2, 3, ... are

13, 241, 2, 3, 191, 5, 2, 3, 2683, ... (sequence A271782 in the OEIS)

== See also ==
- Wieferich prime
- Wolstenholme prime
- Wilson prime
- PrimeGrid
- Fibonacci prime
- Pisano period
- Table of congruences
