= Wolstenholme prime =

Special type of prime number

- Named after: Joseph Wolstenholme
- Publication year: 1995
- Author of publication: McIntosh, R. J.
- No. of known terms: 2
- Conjectured no. of terms: Infinite
- Subsequence of: Irregular primes
- First terms: 16843, 2124679
- Largest known term: 2124679
- OEIS index: A088164; Wolstenholme primes: primes p such that binomial(2p-1,p-1) == 1 (mod p^4)

In number theory, a Wolstenholme prime is a special type of prime number satisfying a stronger version of Wolstenholme's theorem. Wolstenholme's theorem is a congruence relation satisfied by all prime numbers greater than 3. Wolstenholme primes are named after mathematician Joseph Wolstenholme, who first described this theorem in the 19th century.

Interest in these primes first arose due to their connection with Fermat's Last Theorem. Wolstenholme primes are also related to other special classes of numbers, studied in the hope to be able to generalize a proof for the truth of the theorem to all positive integers greater than two.

The only two known Wolstenholme primes are 16843 and 2124679 (sequence A088164 in the OEIS). There are no other Wolstenholme primes less than 10^{11}.

== Definition ==
Unsolved problem in mathematics
Are there any Wolstenholme primes other than 16843 and 2124679?
More unsolved problems in mathematics

Wolstenholme prime can be defined in a number of equivalent ways.

=== Definition via binomial coefficients ===
A Wolstenholme prime is a prime number p > 7 that satisfies the congruence

$${2p-1 \choose p-1} \equiv 1 \pmod{p^4},$$

where the expression in left-hand side denotes a binomial coefficient. In comparison, Wolstenholme's theorem states that for every prime p > 3 the following congruence holds:

$${2p-1 \choose p-1} \equiv 1 \pmod{p^3}.$$

=== Definition via Bernoulli numbers ===
A Wolstenholme prime is a prime p that divides the numerator of the Bernoulli number B_{p−3}, or equivalently,

$$B_{p-3} \equiv 0 \pmod p$$

The Wolstenholme primes therefore form a subset of the irregular primes.

=== Definition via irregular pairs ===
A Wolstenholme prime is a prime p such that (p, p−3) is an irregular pair.

=== Definition via harmonic numbers ===
A Wolstenholme prime is a prime p such that

$$H_{p - 1} \equiv 0 \pmod{p^3}\, ,$$

i.e. the numerator of the harmonic number $H_{p-1}$ expressed in lowest terms is divisible by p^{3}.

== Properties ==
A prime p > 7 is a Wolstenholme prime if and only if

$$\sum_{k=\lfloor p/6\rfloor+1}^{\lfloor p/4\rfloor}\frac1{k^3}\equiv0\pmod p$$

== Search and current status ==
The search for Wolstenholme primes began in the 1960s and continued over the following decades, with the latest results published in 2022. The first Wolstenholme prime 16843 was found in 1964, although it was not explicitly reported at that time. The 1964 discovery was later independently confirmed in the 1970s. This remained the only known example of such a prime for almost 20 years, until the discovery announcement of the second Wolstenholme prime 2124679 in 1993. Up to 1.2×10^{7}, no further Wolstenholme primes were found. This was later extended to 2×10^{8} by McIntosh in 1995 and Trevisan and Weber were able to reach 2.5×10^{8}. The latest result as of 2022 is that there are only those two Wolstenholme primes up to 10^{11}.

== Expected number of Wolstenholme primes ==
It is conjectured that infinitely many Wolstenholme primes exist. It is conjectured that the number of Wolstenholme primes less than $x$ is about $\log\log x$. For each prime $p\geq 5$, the Wolstenholme quotient is defined as

$$W_p = \frac{{2p-1 \choose p-1}-1}{p^3}.$$

Clearly, $p$ is a Wolstenholme prime if and only if $W_p\equiv 0\!\pmod{p}$. Empirically, one may assume that the remainders of $W_p$ modulo $p$ are uniformly distributed in the set $\{0,1,\dots,p-1\}$. By this reasoning, the probability that the remainder takes on a particular value (e.g., 0) is about $1/p$.

== See also ==
- Wieferich prime
- Wall–Sun–Sun prime
- Wilson prime
- Table of congruences
