= Pisano period =

Period of the Fibonacci sequence modulo an integer

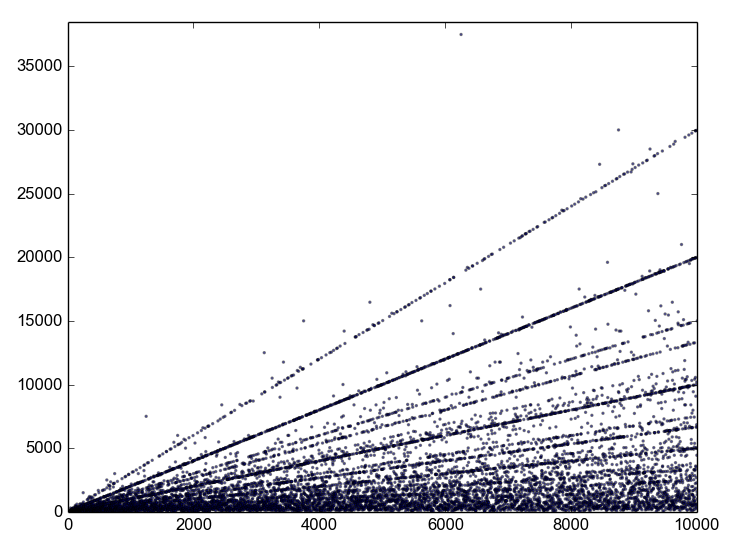
Plot of the first 10,000 Pisano periods.

In number theory, the nth Pisano period, written as π(n), is the period with which the sequence of Fibonacci numbers taken modulo n repeats. Pisano periods are named after Leonardo Pisano, better known as Fibonacci. The existence of periodic functions in Fibonacci numbers was noted by Joseph Louis Lagrange in 1774.

== Definition ==
The Fibonacci numbers are the numbers in the integer sequence:

0, 1, 1, 2, 3, 5, 8, 13, 21, 34, 55, 89, 144, 233, 377, 610, 987, 1597, 2584, 4181, 6765, 10946, 17711, 28657, 46368, ... (sequence A000045 in the OEIS)

defined by the recurrence relation

$$F_0 = 0$$
$$F_1 = 1$$
$$F_i = F_{i-1} + F_{i-2}.$$

For any integer n, the sequence of Fibonacci numbers F_{i} taken modulo n is periodic. The Pisano period, denoted π(n), is the length of the period of this sequence. For example, the sequence of Fibonacci numbers modulo 3 begins:

0, 1, 1, 2, 0, 2, 2, 1, 0, 1, 1, 2, 0, 2, 2, 1, 0, 1, 1, 2, 0, 2, 2, 1, 0, ... (sequence A082115 in the OEIS)

This sequence has period 8, so π(3) = 8.

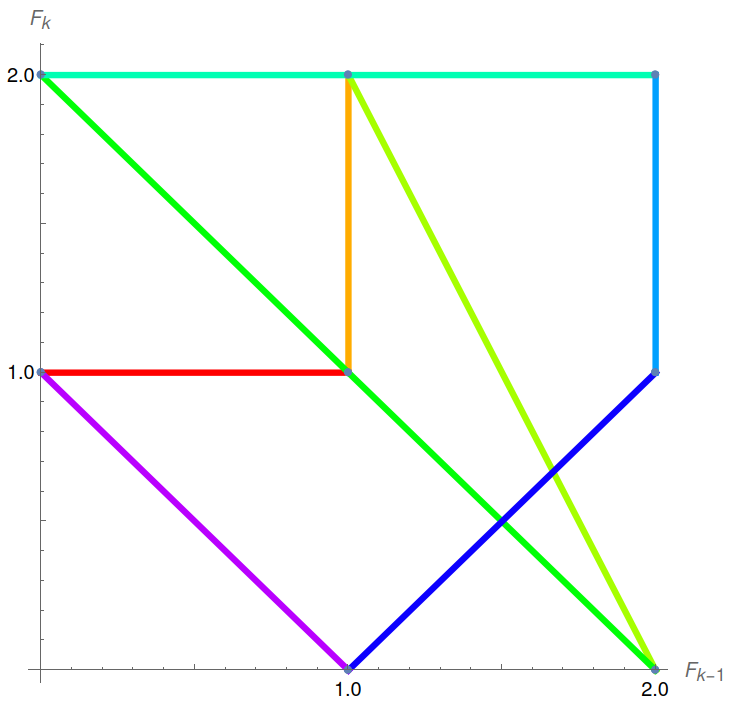
For n = 3, this is a visualization of the Pisano period in the two-dimensional state space of the recurrence relation. The axes could also have been called "previous" and "current." The journey begins at (previous, current) = (0, 1) with red color, and then progresses through the colors of the rainbow eventually reaching (1, 0) and then returning to (0, 1). We see π(3) = 8.

== Properties ==
=== Parity ===
With the exception of π(2) = 3, the Pisano period π(n) is always even.

This follows by observing that π(n) is equal to the order of the Fibonacci matrix

$$\mathbf Q = \begin{bmatrix} 1 & 1\\1 & 0 \end{bmatrix}$$

in the general linear group $\text{GL}_2(\mathbb{Z}_n)$of invertible 2 by 2 matrices in the finite ring $\mathbb{Z}_n$of integers modulo n. Since Q has determinant −1, the determinant of Q^{π(n)} is (−1)^{π(n)}, which is equal to 1 when either n ≤ 2 or π(n) is even.

=== Pisano periods of composite numbers ===
If m and n are coprime, then π(mn) is the least common multiple of π(m) and π(n). This follows from Chinese remainder theorem.

Thus the Pisano periods of composite numbers can be computed by looking at the Pisano periods of prime powers q = p^{k}, for k ≥ 1.

If p is prime, π(p^{k}) divides p^{k–1} π(p). It is unknown if $\pi(p^k) = p^{k-1}\pi(p)$ for every prime p and integer k > 1. Any prime p providing a counterexample would necessarily be a Wall–Sun–Sun prime, and conversely every Wall–Sun–Sun prime p gives a counterexample (set k = 2).

For p = 2 and 5, the exact values of the Pisano periods are known. The periods of powers of these prime powers are as follows:

- If n = 2^{k}, then $\pi(n) = 3 \cdot 2^{k-1} = \frac{3n}2$
- if n = 5^{k}, then $\pi(n) = 4 \cdot 5^k = 4n$

From these it follows that if n = $2^a 5^b$ then $\pi(n) = \left\{ \begin{array}{ll} 6n & a = 1 \\ 3n & a = 2 \\ \frac{3}{2}n & a\geq 3 \\ \end{array} \right.$

=== Pisano periods of prime numbers ===
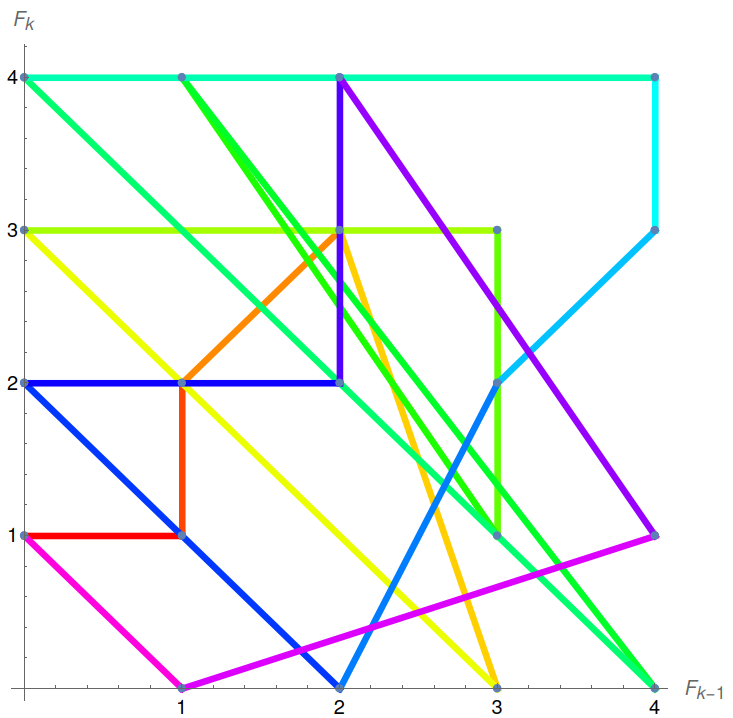
State space visualization of the Pisano period for n = 5

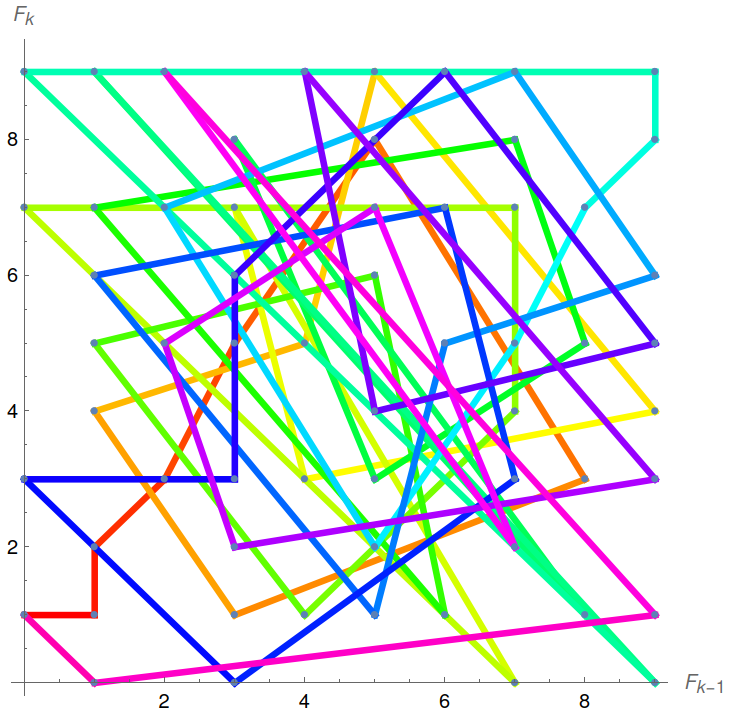
State space visualization of the Pisano period for n = 10

If prime p is different from 2 and 5, then π(p) is a divisor of p^{2} − 1. This follows from the modulo p analogue of Binet's formula, which implies that π(p) is the multiplicative order of a root of x^{2} − x − 1 modulo p.

Every p other than 2 and 5 lie in the residue classes $p \equiv \pm 1\ (\mathrm{mod}\ 10)$ or $p \equiv \pm 3\ (\mathrm{mod}\ 10)$.

- If $p \equiv \pm 1\ (\mathrm{mod}\ 10)$, then π(p) divides p − 1.
- If $p \equiv \pm 3\ (\mathrm{mod}\ 10)$, then π(p) divides 2(p + 1).

The former can be proven by observing that if $p \equiv \pm 1\ (\mathrm{mod}\ 10)$, then the roots of x^{2} − x − 1 modulo p belong to $\mathbb{F}_{p} = \mathbb{Z}/p\mathbb{Z}$ (by quadratic reciprocity). Thus their order, π(p) is a divisor of p − 1.

To prove the latter, if $p \equiv \pm 3\ (\mathrm{mod}\ 10),$ the roots modulo p of x^{2} − x − 1 do not belong to $\mathbb{F}_{p}$ (by quadratic reciprocity again), and belong to the finite field $\mathbb{F}_{p}[x]/(x^2 - x - 1).$ As the Frobenius automorphism $x \mapsto x^p$ exchanges these roots, it follows that, denoting them by r and s, we have r^{p} = s, and thus r^{p+1} = –1. That is r^{2(p+1)} = 1, and the Pisano period, which is the order of r, is the quotient of 2(p + 1) by an odd divisor.

It follows from above results, that if n = p^{k} is an odd prime power such that π(n) > n, then π(n)/4 is an integer that is not greater than n. The multiplicative property of Pisano periods imply thus that

π(n) ≤ 6n, with equality if and only if n = 2 · 5^{r}, for r ≥ 1.

If n is not of the form 2 · 5^{r}, then π(n) ≤ 4n.

== Tables ==
The first twelve Pisano periods (sequence A001175 in the OEIS) and their cycles (with spaces before the zeros for readability) are (using A and B for ten and eleven, respectively):

n	π(n)	number of zeros in the cycle ((sequence A001176 in the OEIS))	cycle ((sequence A161553 in the OEIS))	OEIS sequence for the cycle
1	1	1	0	A000004
2	3	1	011	A011655
3	8	2	0112 0221	A082115
4	6	1	011231	A079343
5	20	4	01123 03314 04432 02241	A082116
6	24	2	011235213415 055431453251	A082117
7	16	2	01123516 06654261	A105870
8	12	2	011235 055271	A079344
9	24	2	011235843718 088764156281	A007887
10	60	4	011235831459437 077415617853819 099875279651673 033695493257291	A003893
11	10	1	01123582A1	A105955
12	24	2	011235819A75 055A314592B1	A089911

The first 144 Pisano periods are shown in the following table:

π(n)	+1	+2	+3	+4	+5	+6	+7	+8	+9	+10	+11	+12
0+	1	3	8	6	20	24	16	12	24	60	10	24
12+	28	48	40	24	36	24	18	60	16	30	48	24
24+	100	84	72	48	14	120	30	48	40	36	80	24
36+	76	18	56	60	40	48	88	30	120	48	32	24
48+	112	300	72	84	108	72	20	48	72	42	58	120
60+	60	30	48	96	140	120	136	36	48	240	70	24
72+	148	228	200	18	80	168	78	120	216	120	168	48
84+	180	264	56	60	44	120	112	48	120	96	180	48
96+	196	336	120	300	50	72	208	84	80	108	72	72
108+	108	60	152	48	76	72	240	42	168	174	144	120
120+	110	60	40	30	500	48	256	192	88	420	130	120
132+	144	408	360	36	276	48	46	240	32	210	140	24

== Pisano periods of Fibonacci numbers ==
If n = F(2k) (k ≥ 2), then π(n) = 4k; if n = F(2k + 1) (k ≥ 2), then π(n) = 8k + 4. That is, if the modulo base is a Fibonacci number (≥ 3) with an even index, the period is twice the index and the cycle has two zeros. If the base is a Fibonacci number (≥ 5) with an odd index, the period is four times the index and the cycle has four zeros.

k	F(k)	π(F(k))	first half of cycle (for even k ≥ 4) or first quarter of cycle (for odd k ≥ 4) or all cycle (for k ≤ 3) (with selected second halves or second quarters)
1	1	1	0
2	1	1	0
3	2	3	0, 1, 1
4	3	8	0, 1, 1, 2, (0, 2, 2, 1)
5	5	20	0, 1, 1, 2, 3, (0, 3, 3, 1, 4)
6	8	12	0, 1, 1, 2, 3, 5, (0, 5, 5, 2, 7, 1)
7	13	28	0, 1, 1, 2, 3, 5, 8, (0, 8, 8, 3, 11, 1, 12)
8	21	16	0, 1, 1, 2, 3, 5, 8, 13, (0, 13, 13, 5, 18, 2, 20, 1)
9	34	36	0, 1, 1, 2, 3, 5, 8, 13, 21, (0, 21, 21, 8, 29, 3, 32, 1, 33)
10	55	20	0, 1, 1, 2, 3, 5, 8, 13, 21, 34, (0, 34, 34, 13, 47, 5, 52, 2, 54, 1)
11	89	44	0, 1, 1, 2, 3, 5, 8, 13, 21, 34, 55, (0, 55, 55, 21, 76, 8, 84, 3, 87, 1, 88)
12	144	24	0, 1, 1, 2, 3, 5, 8, 13, 21, 34, 55, 89, (0, 89, 89, 34, 123, 13, 136, 5, 141, 2, 143, 1)
13	233	52	0, 1, 1, 2, 3, 5, 8, 13, 21, 34, 55, 89, 144
14	377	28	0, 1, 1, 2, 3, 5, 8, 13, 21, 34, 55, 89, 144, 233
15	610	60	0, 1, 1, 2, 3, 5, 8, 13, 21, 34, 55, 89, 144, 233, 377
16	987	32	0, 1, 1, 2, 3, 5, 8, 13, 21, 34, 55, 89, 144, 233, 377, 610
17	1597	68	0, 1, 1, 2, 3, 5, 8, 13, 21, 34, 55, 89, 144, 233, 377, 610, 987
18	2584	36	0, 1, 1, 2, 3, 5, 8, 13, 21, 34, 55, 89, 144, 233, 377, 610, 987, 1597
19	4181	76	0, 1, 1, 2, 3, 5, 8, 13, 21, 34, 55, 89, 144, 233, 377, 610, 987, 1597, 2584
20	6765	40	0, 1, 1, 2, 3, 5, 8, 13, 21, 34, 55, 89, 144, 233, 377, 610, 987, 1597, 2584, 4181
21	10946	84	0, 1, 1, 2, 3, 5, 8, 13, 21, 34, 55, 89, 144, 233, 377, 610, 987, 1597, 2584, 4181, 6765
22	17711	44	0, 1, 1, 2, 3, 5, 8, 13, 21, 34, 55, 89, 144, 233, 377, 610, 987, 1597, 2584, 4181, 6765, 10946
23	28657	92	0, 1, 1, 2, 3, 5, 8, 13, 21, 34, 55, 89, 144, 233, 377, 610, 987, 1597, 2584, 4181, 6765, 10946, 17711
24	46368	48	0, 1, 1, 2, 3, 5, 8, 13, 21, 34, 55, 89, 144, 233, 377, 610, 987, 1597, 2584, 4181, 6765, 10946, 17711, 28657

== Pisano periods of Lucas numbers ==
If n = L(2k) (k ≥ 1), then π(n) = 8k; if n = L(2k + 1) (k ≥ 1), then π(n) = 4k + 2. That is, if the modulo base is a Lucas number (≥ 3) with an even index, the period is four times the index. If the base is a Lucas number (≥ 4) with an odd index, the period is twice the index.

k	L(k)	π(L(k))	first half of cycle (for odd k ≥ 2) or first quarter of cycle (for even k ≥ 2) or all cycle (for k = 1) (with selected second halves or second quarters)
1	1	1	0
2	3	8	0, 1, (1, 2)
3	4	6	0, 1, 1, (2, 3, 1)
4	7	16	0, 1, 1, 2, (3, 5, 1, 6)
5	11	10	0, 1, 1, 2, 3, (5, 8, 2, 10, 1)
6	18	24	0, 1, 1, 2, 3, 5, (8, 13, 3, 16, 1, 17)
7	29	14	0, 1, 1, 2, 3, 5, 8, (13, 21, 5, 26, 2, 28, 1)
8	47	32	0, 1, 1, 2, 3, 5, 8, 13, (21, 34, 8, 42, 3, 45, 1, 46)
9	76	18	0, 1, 1, 2, 3, 5, 8, 13, 21, (34, 55, 13, 68, 5, 73, 2, 75, 1)
10	123	40	0, 1, 1, 2, 3, 5, 8, 13, 21, 34, (55, 89, 21, 110, 8, 118, 3, 121, 1, 122)
11	199	22	0, 1, 1, 2, 3, 5, 8, 13, 21, 34, 55, (89, 144, 34, 178, 13, 191, 5, 196, 2, 198, 1)
12	322	48	0, 1, 1, 2, 3, 5, 8, 13, 21, 34, 55, 89, (144, 233, 55, 288, 21, 309, 8, 317, 3, 320, 1, 321)
13	521	26	0, 1, 1, 2, 3, 5, 8, 13, 21, 34, 55, 89, 144
14	843	56	0, 1, 1, 2, 3, 5, 8, 13, 21, 34, 55, 89, 144, 233
15	1364	30	0, 1, 1, 2, 3, 5, 8, 13, 21, 34, 55, 89, 144, 233, 377
16	2207	64	0, 1, 1, 2, 3, 5, 8, 13, 21, 34, 55, 89, 144, 233, 377, 610
17	3571	34	0, 1, 1, 2, 3, 5, 8, 13, 21, 34, 55, 89, 144, 233, 377, 610, 987
18	5778	72	0, 1, 1, 2, 3, 5, 8, 13, 21, 34, 55, 89, 144, 233, 377, 610, 987, 1597
19	9349	38	0, 1, 1, 2, 3, 5, 8, 13, 21, 34, 55, 89, 144, 233, 377, 610, 987, 1597, 2584
20	15127	80	0, 1, 1, 2, 3, 5, 8, 13, 21, 34, 55, 89, 144, 233, 377, 610, 987, 1597, 2584, 4181
21	24476	42	0, 1, 1, 2, 3, 5, 8, 13, 21, 34, 55, 89, 144, 233, 377, 610, 987, 1597, 2584, 4181, 6765
22	39603	88	0, 1, 1, 2, 3, 5, 8, 13, 21, 34, 55, 89, 144, 233, 377, 610, 987, 1597, 2584, 4181, 6765, 10946
23	64079	46	0, 1, 1, 2, 3, 5, 8, 13, 21, 34, 55, 89, 144, 233, 377, 610, 987, 1597, 2584, 4181, 6765, 10946, 17711
24	103682	96	0, 1, 1, 2, 3, 5, 8, 13, 21, 34, 55, 89, 144, 233, 377, 610, 987, 1597, 2584, 4181, 6765, 10946, 17711, 28657

For even k, the cycle has two zeros. For odd k, the cycle has only one zero, and the second half of the cycle, which is of course equal to the part on the left of 0, consists of alternatingly numbers F(2m + 1) and n − F(2m), with m decreasing.

== Number of zeros in the cycle ==
The number of occurrences of 0 per cycle is 1, 2, or 4. Let p be the number after the first 0 after the combination 0, 1. Let the distance between the 0s be q.

- There is one 0 in a cycle, obviously, if p = 1. This is only possible if q is even or n is 1 or 2.
- Otherwise there are two 0s in a cycle if p^{2} ≡ 1. This is only possible if q is even.
- Otherwise there are four 0s in a cycle. This is the case if q is odd and n is not 1 or 2.

For generalized Fibonacci sequences (satisfying the same recurrence relation, but with other initial values, e.g. the Lucas numbers) the number of occurrences of 0 per cycle is 0, 1, 2, or 4.

The ratio of the Pisano period of n and the number of zeros modulo n in the cycle gives the rank of apparition or Fibonacci entry point of n. That is, smallest index k such that n divides F(k). They are:

1, 3, 4, 6, 5, 12, 8, 6, 12, 15, 10, 12, 7, 24, 20, 12, 9, 12, 18, 30, 8, 30, 24, 12, 25, 21, 36, 24, 14, 60, 30, 24, 20, 9, 40, 12, 19, 18, 28, 30, 20, 24, 44, 30, 60, 24, 16, 12, ... (sequence A001177 in the OEIS)

In Renault's paper the number of zeros is called the "order" of F mod m, denoted $\omega(m)$, and the "rank of apparition" is called the "rank" and denoted $\alpha(m)$.

According to Wall's conjecture, $\alpha(p^e) = p^{e-1} \alpha(p)$. If $m$ has prime factorization $m = p_1^{e_1} p_2^{e_2} \dots p_n^{e_n}$ then $\alpha(m) = \operatorname{lcm}(\alpha(p_1^{e_1}), \alpha(p_2^{e_2}), \dots, \alpha(p_n^{e_n}))$.

== Generalizations ==
The Pisano periods of Lucas numbers are

1, 3, 8, 6, 4, 24, 16, 12, 24, 12, 10, 24, 28, 48, 8, 24, 36, 24, 18, 12, 16, 30, 48, 24, 20, 84, 72, 48, 14, 24, 30, 48, 40, 36, 16, 24, 76, 18, 56, 12, 40, 48, 88, 30, 24, 48, 32, ... (sequence A106291 in the OEIS)

The Pisano periods of Pell numbers (or 2-Fibonacci numbers) are

1, 2, 8, 4, 12, 8, 6, 8, 24, 12, 24, 8, 28, 6, 24, 16, 16, 24, 40, 12, 24, 24, 22, 8, 60, 28, 72, 12, 20, 24, 30, 32, 24, 16, 12, 24, 76, 40, 56, 24, 10, 24, 88, 24, 24, 22, 46, 16, ... (sequence A175181 in the OEIS)

The Pisano periods of 3-Fibonacci numbers are

1, 3, 2, 6, 12, 6, 16, 12, 6, 12, 8, 6, 52, 48, 12, 24, 16, 6, 40, 12, 16, 24, 22, 12, 60, 156, 18, 48, 28, 12, 64, 48, 8, 48, 48, 6, 76, 120, 52, 12, 28, 48, 42, 24, 12, 66, 96, 24, ... (sequence A175182 in the OEIS)

The Pisano periods of Jacobsthal numbers (or (1,2)-Fibonacci numbers) are

1, 1, 6, 2, 4, 6, 6, 2, 18, 4, 10, 6, 12, 6, 12, 2, 8, 18, 18, 4, 6, 10, 22, 6, 20, 12, 54, 6, 28, 12, 10, 2, 30, 8, 12, 18, 36, 18, 12, 4, 20, 6, 14, 10, 36, 22, 46, 6, ... (sequence A175286 in the OEIS)

The Pisano periods of (1,3)-Fibonacci numbers are

1, 3, 1, 6, 24, 3, 24, 6, 3, 24, 120, 6, 156, 24, 24, 12, 16, 3, 90, 24, 24, 120, 22, 6, 120, 156, 9, 24, 28, 24, 240, 24, 120, 48, 24, 6, 171, 90, 156, 24, 336, 24, 42, 120, 24, 66, 736, 12, ... (sequence A175291 in the OEIS)

The Pisano periods of Tribonacci numbers (or 3-step Fibonacci numbers) are

1, 4, 13, 8, 31, 52, 48, 16, 39, 124, 110, 104, 168, 48, 403, 32, 96, 156, 360, 248, 624, 220, 553, 208, 155, 168, 117, 48, 140, 1612, 331, 64, 1430, 96, 1488, 312, 469, 360, 2184, 496, 560, 624, 308, 440, 1209, 2212, 46, 416, ... (sequence A046738 in the OEIS)

The Pisano periods of Tetranacci numbers (or 4-step Fibonacci numbers) are

1, 5, 26, 10, 312, 130, 342, 20, 78, 1560, 120, 130, 84, 1710, 312, 40, 4912, 390, 6858, 1560, 4446, 120, 12166, 260, 1560, 420, 234, 1710, 280, 1560, 61568, 80, 1560, 24560, 17784, 390, 1368, 34290, 1092, 1560, 240, 22230, 162800, 120, 312, 60830, 103822, 520, ... (sequence A106295 in the OEIS)

See also generalizations of Fibonacci numbers.

== Number theory ==
Pisano periods can be analyzed using algebraic number theory.

Let $\pi_k(n)$ be the n-th Pisano period of the k-Fibonacci sequence F_{k}(n) (k can be any natural number, these sequences are defined as F_{k}(0) = 0, F_{k}(1) = 1, and for any natural number n > 1, F_{k}(n) = kF_{k}(n−1) + F_{k}(n−2)). If m and n are coprime, then $\pi_k(m\cdot n) = \mathrm{lcm}(\pi_k(m),\pi_k(n))$, by the Chinese remainder theorem: two numbers are congruent modulo mn if and only if they are congruent modulo m and modulo n, assuming these latter are coprime. For example, $\pi_1(3)=8$ and $\pi_1(4)=6,$ so $\pi_1(12=3\cdot 4) = \mathrm{lcm}(\pi_1(3),\pi_1(4))= \mathrm{lcm}(8,6)=24.$ Thus it suffices to compute Pisano periods for prime powers $q=p^n.$ (Usually, $\pi_k(p^n) = p^{n-1}\cdot \pi_k(p)$, unless p is k-Wall–Sun–Sun prime, or k-Fibonacci–Wieferich prime, that is, p^{2} divides F_{k}(p − 1) or F_{k}(p + 1), where F_{k} is the k-Fibonacci sequence, for example, 241 is a 3-Wall–Sun–Sun prime, since 241^{2} divides F_{3}(242).)

For prime numbers p, these can be analyzed by using Binet's formula:

$F_k\left(n\right) = {{\varphi_k^n-(k-\varphi_k)^n} \over {\sqrt {k^2+4}}}={{\varphi_k^{n}-(-1/\varphi_k)^{n}} \over {\sqrt {k^2+4}}},\,$ where $\varphi_k$ is the kth metallic mean
$$\varphi_k = \frac{k + \sqrt{k^2+4}}{2}.$$

If k^{2} + 4 is a quadratic residue modulo p (where p > 2 and p does not divide k^{2} + 4), then $\sqrt{k^2+4}, 1/2,$ and $k/\sqrt{k^2+4}$ can be expressed as integers modulo p, and thus Binet's formula can be expressed over integers modulo p, and thus the Pisano period divides the totient $\phi(p)=p-1$, since any power (such as $\varphi_k^n$) has period dividing $\phi(p),$ as this is the order of the group of units modulo p.

For k = 1, this first occurs for p = 11, where 4^{2} = 16 ≡ 5 (mod 11) and 2 · 6 = 12 ≡ 1 (mod 11) and 4 · 3 = 12 ≡ 1 (mod 11) so 4 = √5, 6 = 1/2 and 1/√5 = 3, yielding φ = (1 + 4) · 6 = 30 ≡ 8 (mod 11) and the congruence

$$F_1\left(n\right) \equiv 3\cdot \left(8^n - 4^n\right) \pmod{11}.$$

Another example, which shows that the period can properly divide p − 1, is π_{1}(29) = 14.

If k^{2} + 4 is not a quadratic residue modulo p, then Binet's formula is instead defined over the quadratic extension field $(\mathbb{Z}/p)[\sqrt{k^2+4}]$, which has p^{2} elements and whose group of units thus has order p^{2} − 1, and thus the Pisano period divides p^{2} − 1. For example, for p = 3 one has π_{1}(3) = 8 which equals 3^{2} − 1 = 8; for p = 7, one has π_{1}(7) = 16, which properly divides 7^{2} − 1 = 48.

This analysis fails for p = 2 and p is a divisor of the squarefree part of k^{2} + 4, since in these cases are zero divisors, so one must be careful in interpreting 1/2 or $\sqrt{k^2+4}$. For p = 2, k^{2} + 4 is congruent to 1 mod 2 (for k odd), but the Pisano period is not p − 1 = 1, but rather 3 (in fact, this is also 3 for even k). For p divides the squarefree part of k^{2} + 4, the Pisano period is π_{k}(k^{2} + 4) = p^{2} − p = p(p − 1), which does not divide p − 1 or p^{2} − 1.

== Fibonacci integer sequences modulo n ==
One can consider Fibonacci integer sequences and take them modulo n, or put differently, consider Fibonacci sequences in the ring Z/nZ. The period is a divisor of π(n). The number of occurrences of 0 per cycle is 0, 1, 2, or 4. If n is not a prime the cycles include those that are multiples of the cycles for the divisors. For example, for n = 10 the extra cycles include those for n = 2 multiplied by 5, and for n = 5 multiplied by 2.

Table of the extra cycles: (the original Fibonacci cycles are excluded) (using A and B for ten and eleven, respectively)

n	multiples	other cycles	number of cycles (including the original Fibonacci cycles)
1			1
2	0		2
3	0		2
4	0, 022	033213	4
5	0	1342	3
6	0, 0224 0442, 033		4
7	0	02246325 05531452, 03362134 04415643	4
8	0, 022462, 044, 066426	033617 077653, 134732574372, 145167541563	8
9	0, 0336 0663	022461786527 077538213472, 044832573145 055167426854	5
10	0, 02246 06628 08864 04482, 055, 2684	134718976392	6
11	0	02246A5492, 0336942683, 044819A874, 055A437A65, 0661784156, 0773A21347, 0885279538, 0997516729, 0AA986391A, 14593, 18964A3257, 28A76	14
12	0, 02246A42682AA, 0AA8628A64A2, 033693, 0448 0884, 066, 099639	07729B873A1B 0BBA974B3257, 1347B65B437A538B761783B2, 156B5491AB98516718952794	10

Number of Fibonacci integer cycles mod n are:

1, 2, 2, 4, 3, 4, 4, 8, 5, 6, 14, 10, 7, 8, 12, 16, 9, 16, 22, 16, 29, 28, 12, 30, 13, 14, 14, 22, 63, 24, 34, 32, 39, 34, 30, 58, 19, 86, 32, 52, 43, 58, 22, 78, 39, 46, 70, 102, ... (sequence A015134 in the OEIS)
