= Edward Waring =

English mathematician (1736–1798)

Edward Waring FRS
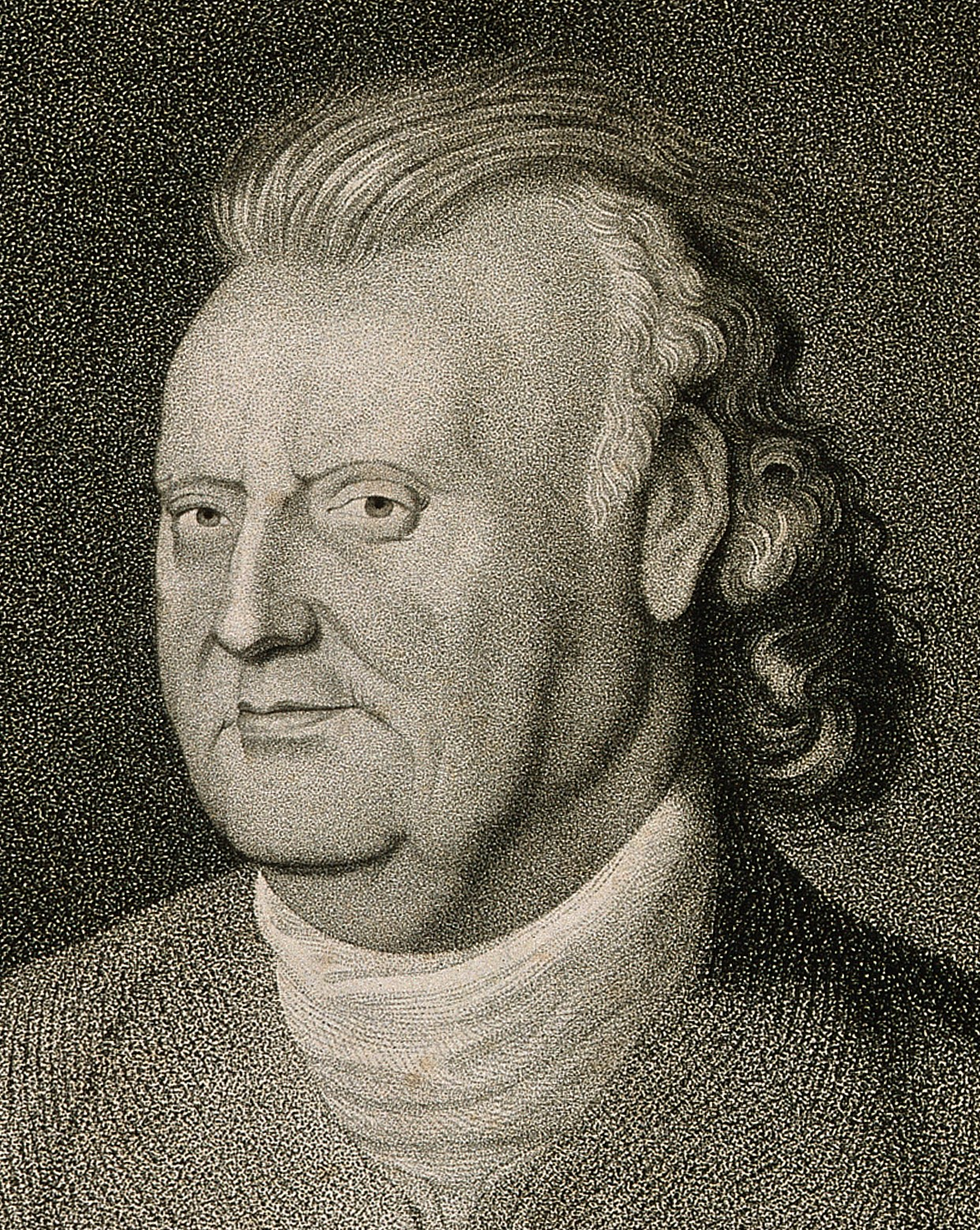
- Waring (ca. 1736–1798). Portrait by Thomas Kerrich, 1794.
- Born: c. 1736; Old Heath, Shropshire, England, Kingdom of Great Britain
- Died: 15 August 1798 (aged 62); Plealey, Pontesbury, Shropshire, England
- Education: Magdalene College, Cambridge
- Known for: Waring's problem Waring's prime number conjecture
- Awards: Copley Medal (1784)
- Scientific career
- Fields: Mathematics
- Institutions: University of Cambridge
- Notable students: John Wilson; John Dawson

Edward Waring (c. 1736 – 15 August 1798) was a British mathematician. He entered Magdalene College, Cambridge as a sizar and became Senior wrangler in 1757. He was elected a fellow of Magdalene and in 1760 Lucasian Professor of Mathematics, holding the chair until his death. He made the assertion known as Waring's problem without proof in his writings Meditationes Algebraicae. Waring was elected a fellow of the Royal Society in 1763 and awarded the Copley Medal in 1784.

== Early years ==
Waring was the eldest son of John and Elizabeth Waring, a prosperous farming couple. He received his early education in Shrewsbury School under a Mr Hotchkin and was admitted as a sizar at Magdalene College, Cambridge, on 24 March 1753, being also Millington exhibitioner.

His extraordinary talent for mathematics was recognised from his early years in Cambridge. In 1757 he graduated BA as senior wrangler and on 24 April 1758 was elected to a fellowship at Magdalene. He belonged to the Hyson Club, whose members included William Paley.

== Career ==
At the end of 1759 Waring published the first chapter of Miscellanea Analytica. On 28 January the next year he was appointed Lucasian professor of mathematics, one of the highest positions in Cambridge. William Samuel Powell, then tutor in St John's College, Cambridge opposed Waring's election and instead supported the candidacy of William Ludlam. In the polemic with Powell, Waring was backed by John Wilson. In fact Waring was very young and did not hold the MA, necessary for qualifying for the Lucasian chair, but this was granted him in 1760 by royal mandate. In 1762 he published the full Miscellanea Analytica, mainly devoted to the theory of numbers and algebraic equations. In 1763 he was elected to the Royal Society. He was awarded its Copley Medal in 1784 but withdrew from the society in 1795, after he had reached sixty, 'on account of [his] age'. Waring was also a member of the academies of sciences of Göttingen and Bologna. In 1767 he took an MD degree, but his activity in medicine was quite limited. He carried out dissections with Richard Watson, professor of chemistry and later bishop of Llandaff. From about 1770 he was physician at Addenbrooke's Hospital at Cambridge, and he also practised at St Ives, Huntingdonshire, where he lived for some years after 1767. His career as a physician was not very successful since he was seriously short-sighted and a very shy man.

== Personal life ==
Waring had a younger brother, Humphrey, who obtained a fellowship at Magdalene in 1775. In 1776 Waring married Mary Oswell, sister of a draper in Shrewsbury; they moved to Shrewsbury and then retired to Plealey, 8 miles out of the town, where Waring owned an estate of 215 acres in 1797

== Work ==
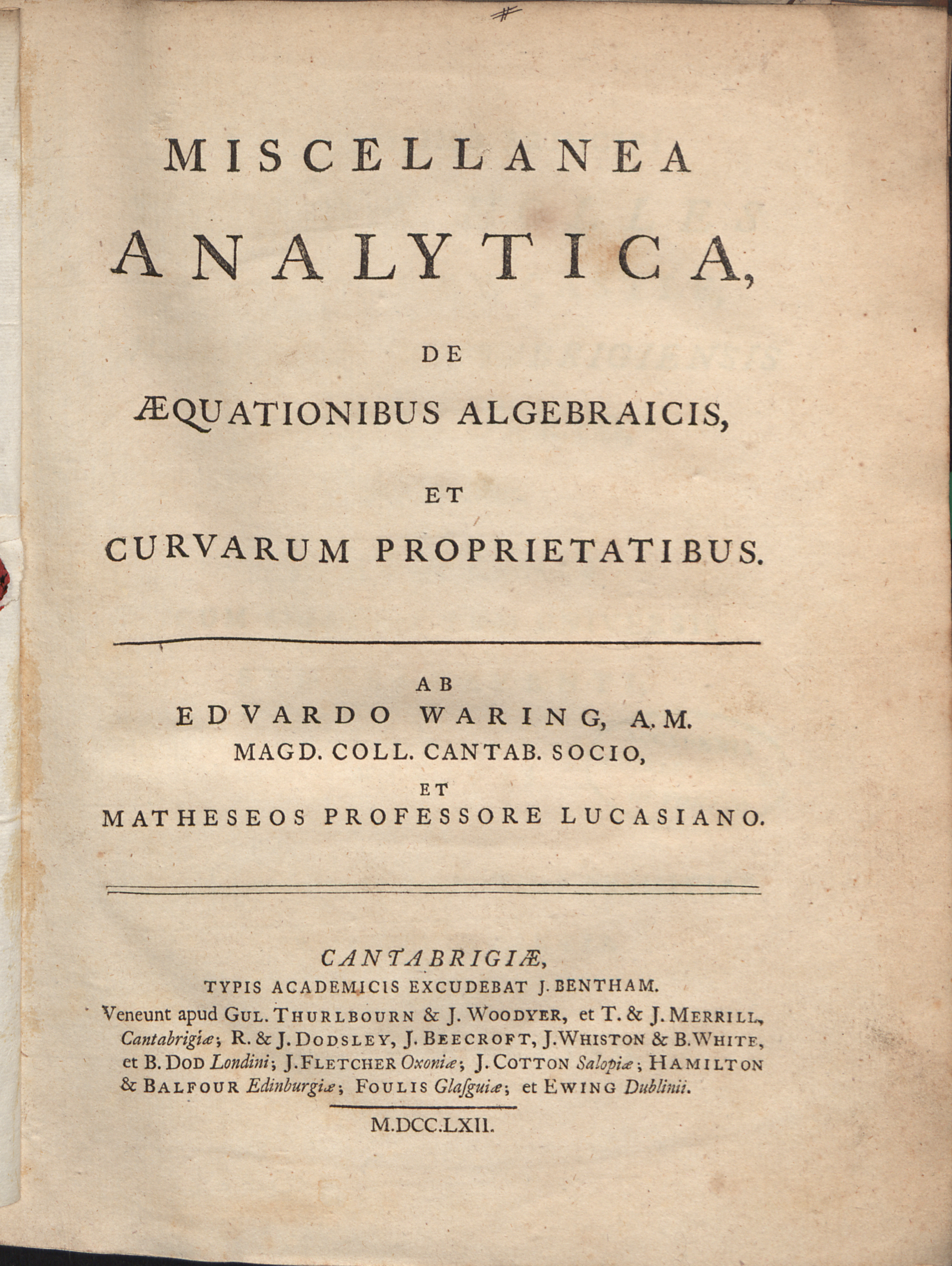
Miscellanea analytica, 1762

Waring wrote a number of papers in the Philosophical Transactions of the Royal Society, dealing with the resolution of algebraic equations, number theory, series, approximation of roots, interpolation, the geometry of conic sections, and dynamics. The Meditationes Algebraicae (1770), where many of the results published in Miscellanea Analytica were reworked and expanded, was described by Joseph-Louis Lagrange as 'a work full of excellent researches'. In this work Waring published many theorems concerning the solution of algebraic equations which attracted the attention of continental mathematicians, but his best results are in number theory. Included in this work was the so-called Goldbach conjecture (every even integer is the sum of two primes), and also the following conjecture: every odd integer is a prime or the sum of three primes. Lagrange had proved that every positive integer is the sum of not more than four squares; Waring suggested that every positive integer is either a cube or the sum of not more than nine cubes. He also advanced the hypothesis that every positive integer is either a biquadrate (fourth power) or the sum of not more than nineteen biquadrates. These hypotheses form what is known as Waring's problem. He also published a theorem, due to his friend John Wilson, concerning prime numbers; it was later proven rigorously by Lagrange.

In Proprietates Algebraicarum Curvarum (1772) Waring reissued in a much revised form the first four chapters of the second part of Miscellanea Analytica. He devoted himself to the classification of higher plane curves, improving results obtained by Isaac Newton, James Stirling, Leonhard Euler, and Gabriel Cramer. In 1794 he published a few copies of a philosophical work entitled An Essay on the Principles of Human Knowledge, which were circulated among his friends.

Waring's mathematical style is highly analytical. In fact he criticised those British mathematicians who adhered too strictly to geometry. It is indicative that he was one of the subscribers of John Landen's Residual Analysis (1764), one of the works in which the tradition of the Newtonian fluxional calculus was more severely criticised. In the preface of Meditationes Analyticae Waring showed a good knowledge of continental mathematicians such as Alexis Clairaut, Jean le Rond d'Alembert, and Euler. He lamented the fact that in Great Britain mathematics was cultivated with less interest than on the continent, and clearly desired to be considered as highly as the great names in continental mathematics—there is no doubt that he was reading their work at a level never reached by any other eighteenth-century British mathematician. Most notably, at the end of chapter three of Meditationes Analyticae Waring presents some partial fluxional equations (partial differential equations in Leibnizian terminology); such equations are a mathematical instrument of great importance in the study of continuous bodies which was almost completely neglected in Britain before Waring's researches. One of the most interesting results in Meditationes Analyticae is a test for the convergence of series generally attributed to d'Alembert (the 'ratio test'). The theory of convergence of series (the object of which is to establish when the summation of an infinite number of terms can be said to have a finite 'sum') was not much advanced in the eighteenth century.

Waring's work was known both in Britain and on the continent, but it is difficult to evaluate his impact on the development of mathematics. His work on algebraic equations contained in Miscellanea Analytica was translated into Italian by Vincenzo Riccati in 1770. Waring's style is not systematic and his exposition is often obscure. It seems that he never lectured and did not habitually correspond with other mathematicians. After Jérôme Lalande in 1796 observed, in Notice sur la vie de Condorcet, that in 1764 there was not a single first-rate analyst in England, Waring's reply, published after his death as 'Original letter of Dr Waring' in the Monthly Magazine, stated that he had given 'somewhere between three and four hundred new propositions of one kind or another'.

== Death ==
During his last years he sank into a deep religious melancholy, and a violent cold caused his death, in Plealey, on 15 August 1798. He was buried in the churchyard at Fitz, Shropshire.

== See also ==
- Lagrange polynomial
