= Wieferich prime =

Prime such that p^2 divides 2^(p-1)-1

- Named after: Arthur Wieferich
- Publication year: 1909
- Author of publication: Wieferich, A.
- No. of known terms: 2
- Conjectured no. of terms: Infinite
- Subsequence of: Crandall numbers; Wieferich numbers; Lucas–Wieferich primes; near-Wieferich primes
- First terms: 1093, 3511
- Largest known term: 3511
- OEIS index: A001220

In number theory, a Wieferich prime is a prime number p such that p^{2} divides 2^{p − 1} − 1, therefore connecting these primes with Fermat's little theorem, which states that every odd prime p divides 2^{p − 1} − 1. Wieferich primes were first described by Arthur Wieferich in 1909 in works pertaining to Fermat's Last Theorem, at which time both of Fermat's theorems were already well known to mathematicians.

Since then, connections between Wieferich primes and various other topics in mathematics have been discovered, including other types of numbers and primes, such as Mersenne and Fermat numbers, specific types of pseudoprimes and some types of numbers generalized from the original definition of a Wieferich prime. Over time, those connections discovered have extended to cover more properties of certain prime numbers as well as more general subjects such as number fields and the abc conjecture.

As of 2026, the only known Wieferich primes are 1093 and 3511 (sequence A001220 in the OEIS).

== History and search status ==
Unsolved problem in mathematics
Are there infinitely many Wieferich primes?
More unsolved problems in mathematics

In 1902, Meyer proved a theorem about solutions of the congruence a^{p − 1} ≡ 1 (mod p^{r}). Later in that decade Arthur Wieferich showed specifically that if the first case of Fermat's last theorem has solutions for an odd prime exponent, then that prime must satisfy that congruence for a = 2 and r = 2. In other words, if there exist solutions to x^{p} + y^{p} + z^{p} = 0 in integers x, y, z and p an odd prime with p ∤ xyz, then p satisfies 2^{p − 1} ≡ 1 (mod p^{2}). In 1913, Bachmann examined the residues of $\tfrac{2^{p-1}-1}{p}\,\bmod\,p$. He asked the question when this residue vanishes and tried to find expressions for answering this question.

The prime 1093 was found to be a Wieferich prime by W. Meissner in 1913 and confirmed to be the only such prime below 2000. He calculated the smallest residue of $\tfrac{2^{t}-1}{p}\,\bmod\,p$ for all primes p < 2000 and found this residue to be zero for t = 364 and p = 1093, thereby providing a counterexample to a conjecture by Grave about the impossibility of the Wieferich congruence. E. Haentzschel later ordered verification of the correctness of Meissner's congruence via only elementary calculations. Inspired by an earlier work of Euler, he simplified Meissner's proof by showing that 1093^{2} | (2^{182} + 1) and remarked that (2^{182} + 1) is a factor of (2^{364} − 1). It was also shown that it is possible to prove that 1093 is a Wieferich prime without using complex numbers contrary to the method used by Meissner, although Meissner himself hinted at that he was aware of a proof without complex values.

The prime 3511 was first found to be a Wieferich prime by N. G. W. H. Beeger in 1922 and another proof of it being a Wieferich prime was published in 1965 by Guy. In 1960, Kravitz doubled a previous record set by Fröberg and in 1961 Riesel extended the search to 500000 with the aid of the computer BESK. Around 1980, Lehmer was able to reach the search limit of 6×10^{9}. This limit was extended to over 2.5×10^{15} in 2006, finally reaching 3×10^{15}. Eventually, it was shown that if any other Wieferich primes exist, they must be greater than 6.7×10^{15}.

In 2007–2016, a search for Wieferich primes was performed by the distributed computing project Wieferich@Home. In 2011–2017, another search was performed by the PrimeGrid project, although later the work done in this project was claimed wasted. While these projects reached search bounds above 1×10^{17}, neither of them reported any sustainable results.

In 2020, PrimeGrid started another project that searched for Wieferich and Wall–Sun–Sun primes simultaneously. The new project used checksums to enable independent double-checking of each subinterval, thus minimizing the risk of missing an instance because of faulty hardware. The project ended in December 2022, definitely proving that a third Wieferich prime must exceed 2^{64} (about 18×10^{18}).

It has been conjectured (as for Wilson primes) that infinitely many Wieferich primes exist, and that the number of Wieferich primes below x is approximately log(log(x)), which is a heuristic result that follows from the plausible assumption that for a prime p, the (p − 1)-th degree roots of unity modulo p^{2} are uniformly distributed in the multiplicative group of integers modulo p^{2}.

== Properties ==
=== Connection with Fermat's Last Theorem ===
The following theorem connecting Wieferich primes and Fermat's Last Theorem was proven by Wieferich in 1909:

Let p be prime, and let x, y, z be integers such that x^{p} + y^{p} + z^{p} = 0. Furthermore, assume that p does not divide the product xyz. Then p is a Wieferich prime.

The above case (where p does not divide any of x, y or z) is commonly known as the first case of Fermat's Last Theorem (FLTI) and FLTI is said to fail for a prime p, if solutions to the Fermat equation exist for that p, otherwise FLTI holds for p. In 1910, Mirimanoff expanded the theorem by showing that, if the preconditions of the theorem hold true for some prime p, then p^{2} must also divide 3^{p − 1} − 1. Granville and Monagan further proved that p^{2} must actually divide m^{p − 1} − 1 for every prime m ≤ 89. Suzuki extended the proof to all primes m ≤ 113.

Let H_{p} be a set of pairs of integers with 1 as their greatest common divisor, p being prime to x, y and x + y, (x + y)^{p−1} ≡ 1 (mod p^{2}), (x + ξy) being the pth power of an ideal of K with ξ defined as cos 2π/p + i sin 2π/p. K = Q(ξ) is the field extension obtained by adjoining all polynomials in the algebraic number ξ to the field of rational numbers (such an extension is known as a number field or in this particular case, where ξ is a root of unity, a cyclotomic number field). From uniqueness of factorization of ideals in Q(ξ) it follows that if the first case of Fermat's last theorem has solutions x, y, z then p divides x+y+z and (x, y), (y, z) and (z, x) are elements of H_{p}. Granville and Monagan showed that (1, 1) ∈ H_{p} if and only if p is a Wieferich prime.

=== Connection with the abc conjecture and non-Wieferich primes ===
A non-Wieferich prime is a prime p satisfying $2^{p-1}\not\equiv 1\bmod{p^2}$. J. H. Silverman showed in 1988 that if the abc conjecture holds, then there exist infinitely many non-Wieferich primes. More precisely he showed that the abc conjecture implies the existence of a constant only depending on α such that the number of non-Wieferich primes to base α with p less than or equal to a variable X is greater than log(X) as X goes to infinity. Numerical evidence suggests that very few of the prime numbers in a given interval are Wieferich primes. The set of Wieferich primes and the set of non-Wieferich primes, sometimes denoted by W_{2} and W_{2}^{c} respectively, are complementary sets, so if one of them is shown to be finite, the other one would necessarily have to be infinite. It was later shown that the existence of infinitely many non-Wieferich primes already follows from a weaker version of the abc conjecture, called the ABC-(k, ε) conjecture. Additionally, the existence of infinitely many non-Wieferich primes would also follow if there exist infinitely many square-free Mersenne numbers as well as if there exists a real number ξ such that the set {n ∈ N : λ(2^{n} − 1) < 2 − ξ} is of density one, where the index of composition λ(n) of an integer n is defined as $\tfrac{\log n}{\log \gamma (n)}$ and $\gamma (n) = \prod_{p \mid n} p$, meaning $\gamma (n)$ gives the product of all prime factors of n.

=== Connection with Mersenne and Fermat primes ===
It is known that the nth Mersenne number M_{n} = 2^{n} − 1 is prime only if n is prime. Fermat's little theorem implies that if p > 2 is prime, then M_{p−1} (= 2^{p − 1} − 1) is always divisible by p. Since Mersenne numbers of prime indices M_{p} and M_{q} are co-prime,

A prime divisor p of M_{q}, where q is prime, is a Wieferich prime if and only if p^{2} divides M_{q}.

Thus, a Mersenne prime cannot also be a Wieferich prime. A notable open problem is to determine whether or not all Mersenne numbers of prime index are square-free. If q is prime and the Mersenne number M_{q} is not square-free, that is, there exists a prime p for which p^{2} divides M_{q}, then p is a Wieferich prime. Therefore, if there are only finitely many Wieferich primes, then there will be at most finitely many Mersenne numbers with prime index that are not square-free. Rotkiewicz showed a related result: if there are infinitely many square-free Mersenne numbers, then there are infinitely many non-Wieferich primes.

Similarly, if p is prime and p^{2} divides some Fermat number F_{n} = 2^{2^{n}} + 1, then p must be a Wieferich prime.

For the primes 1093 and 3511, it was shown that neither of them is a divisor of any Mersenne number with prime index nor a divisor of any Fermat number, because 364 and 1755 are neither prime nor powers of 2.

=== Connection with other equations ===
Scott and Styer showed that the equation p^{x} − 2^{y} = d has at most one solution in positive integers (x, y), unless when p^{4} | 2^{ord_{p} 2} − 1 if p ≢ 65 (mod 192) or unconditionally when p^{2} | 2^{ord_{p} 2} − 1, where ord_{p} 2 denotes the multiplicative order of 2 modulo p. They also showed that a solution to the equation ±a^{x_{1}} ± 2^{y_{1}} = ±a^{x_{2}} ± 2^{y_{2}} = c must be from a specific set of equations but that this does not hold, if a is a Wieferich prime greater than 1.25 × 10^{15}.

=== Binary periodicity of p − 1 ===
Johnson observed that the two known Wieferich primes are one greater than numbers with periodic binary expansions (1092 = 010001000100_{2}=444_{16}; 3510 = 110110110110_{2}=6666_{8}). The Wieferich@Home project searched for Wieferich primes by testing numbers that are one greater than a number with a periodic binary expansion, but up to a "bit pseudo-length" of 3500 of the tested binary numbers generated by combination of bit strings with a bit length of up to 24 it has not found a new Wieferich prime.

=== Abundancy of p − 1 ===
The known Wieferich primes are one greater than mutually friendly numbers (the shared abundancy index being 112/39).

=== Connection with pseudoprimes ===
It was observed that the two known Wieferich primes are the square factors of all non-square free base-2 Fermat pseudoprimes up to 25×10^{9}. Later computations showed that the only repeated factors of the pseudoprimes up to 10^{12} are 1093 and 3511. In addition, the following connection exists:

Let n be a base 2 pseudoprime and p be a prime divisor of n. If $\tfrac{2^{n-1}-1}{n}\not\equiv 0 \pmod{p}$, then also $\tfrac{2^{p-1}-1}{p}\not\equiv 0 \pmod{p}$.

=== Connection with directed graphs ===
For all primes p up to 100000, L(p^{n+1}) = L(p^{n}) only in two cases: L(1093^{2}) = L(1093) = 364 and L(3511^{2}) = L(3511) = 1755, where L(m) is the number of vertices in the cycle of 1 in the doubling diagram modulo m. Here the doubling diagram represents the directed graph with the non-negative integers less than m as vertices and with directed edges going from each vertex x to vertex 2x reduced modulo m. It was shown, that for all odd prime numbers either L(p^{n+1}) = p · L(p^{n}) or L(p^{n+1}) = L(p^{n}).

=== Properties related to number fields ===
It was shown that $\chi_{D_{0}} \big(p \big) = 1$ and $\lambda\,\!_p \big( \mathbb{Q} \big(\sqrt{D_{0}} \big) \big) = 1$ if and only if 2^{p − 1} ≢ 1 (mod p^{2}) where p is an odd prime and $D_{0} < 0$ is the fundamental discriminant of the imaginary quadratic field $\mathbb{Q} \big(\sqrt{1 - p^2} \big)$. Furthermore, the following was shown: Let p be a Wieferich prime. If p ≡ 3 (mod 4), let $D_{0} < 0$ be the fundamental discriminant of the imaginary quadratic field $\mathbb{Q} \big(\sqrt{1 - p} \big)$ and if p ≡ 1 (mod 4), let $D_{0} < 0$ be the fundamental discriminant of the imaginary quadratic field $\mathbb{Q} \big(\sqrt{4 - p} \big)$. Then $\chi_{D_{0}} \big(p \big) = 1$ and $\lambda\,\!_p \big( \mathbb{Q} \big(\sqrt{D_{0}} \big) \big) = 1$ (χ and λ in this context denote Iwasawa invariants).

Furthermore, the following result was obtained: Let q be an odd prime number, k and p are primes such that p = 2k + 1, k ≡ 3 (mod 4), p ≡ −1 (mod q), p ≢ −1 (mod q^{3}) and the order of q modulo k is $\tfrac{k-1}{2}$. Assume that q divides h^{+}, the class number of the real cyclotomic field $\mathbb{Q} \big( \zeta\,\!_p + \zeta\,\!_p^{-1} \big)$, the cyclotomic field obtained by adjoining the sum of a p-th root of unity and its reciprocal to the field of rational numbers. Then q is a Wieferich prime. This also holds if the conditions p ≡ −1 (mod q) and p ≢ −1 (mod q^{3}) are replaced by p ≡ −3 (mod q) and p ≢ −3 (mod q^{3}) as well as when the condition p ≡ −1 (mod q) is replaced by p ≡ −5 (mod q) (in which case q is a Wall–Sun–Sun prime) and the incongruence condition replaced by p ≢ −5 (mod q^{3}).

== Generalizations ==
=== Near-Wieferich primes ===
A prime p satisfying the congruence 2^{(p−1)/2} ≡ ±1 + Ap (mod p^{2}) with small |A| is commonly called a near-Wieferich prime (sequence A195988 in the OEIS). Near-Wieferich primes with A = 0 represent Wieferich primes. Recent searches, in addition to their primary search for Wieferich primes, also tried to find near-Wieferich primes.

=== Wieferich pairs ===
A Wieferich pair is a pair of primes p and q that satisfy

p^{q − 1} ≡ 1 (mod q^{2}) and q^{p − 1} ≡ 1 (mod p^{2})

so that a Wieferich prime p ≡ 1 (mod 4) will form such a pair (p, 2): the only known instance in this case is p = 1093. There are only 7 known Wieferich pairs.

(2, 1093), (3, 1006003), (5, 1645333507), (5, 188748146801), (83, 4871), (911, 318917), and (2903, 18787) (sequence OEIS: A282293 in OEIS)

=== Wieferich numbers ===
A Wieferich number is an odd natural number n satisfying the congruence 2^{φ(n)} ≡ 1 (mod n^{2}), where φ denotes the Euler's totient function (according to Euler's theorem, 2^{φ(n)} ≡ 1 (mod n) for every odd natural number n). If Wieferich number n is prime, then it is a Wieferich prime. The first few Wieferich numbers are:

1, 1093, 3279, 3511, 7651, 10533, 14209, 17555, 22953, 31599, 42627, 45643, 52665, 68859, 94797, 99463, ... (sequence A077816 in the OEIS)

It can be shown that if there are only finitely many Wieferich primes, then there are only finitely many Wieferich numbers. In particular, if the only Wieferich primes are 1093 and 3511, then there exist exactly 104 Wieferich numbers, which matches the number of Wieferich numbers currently known.

More generally, a natural number n is a Wieferich number to base a, if a^{φ(n)} ≡ 1 (mod n^{2}).

Another definition specifies a Wieferich number as odd natural number n such that n and $\tfrac{2^m-1}{n}$ are not coprime, where m is the multiplicative order of 2 modulo n. The first of these numbers are:

21, 39, 55, 57, 105, 111, 147, 155, 165, 171, 183, 195, 201, 203, 205, 219, 231, 237, 253, 273, 285, 291, 301, 305, 309, 327, 333, 355, 357, 385, 399, ... (sequence A182297 in the OEIS)

As above, if Wieferich number q is prime, then it is a Wieferich prime.

=== Wieferich places ===
Let K be a global field, i.e. a number field or a function field in one variable over a finite field and let E be an elliptic curve. If v is a non-archimedean place of norm q_{v} of K and a ∈ K, with v(a) = 0 then v(a^{q_{v} − 1} − 1) ≥ 1. v is called a Wieferich place for base a, if v(a^{q_{v} − 1} − 1) > 1, an elliptic Wieferich place for base P ∈ E, if N_{v}P ∈ E_{2} and a strong elliptic Wieferich place for base P ∈ E if n_{v}P ∈ E_{2}, where n_{v} is the order of P modulo v and N_{v} gives the number of rational points (over the residue field of v) of the reduction of E at v.

== See also ==
- Wall–Sun–Sun prime – another type of prime number related to FLT
- Wolstenholme prime – another type of prime number related to FLT
- Wilson prime – prime number $p$ such that $p^2$ divides $(p-1)!+1$
- Table of congruences – lists other congruences satisfied by prime numbers
