= Pernicious number =

Number with prime Hamming weight

In number theory, a pernicious number is a positive integer such that the Hamming weight of its binary representation is prime, that is, there is a prime number of 1s when it is written as a binary number.

== Examples ==
The first pernicious number is 3, since 3 = 11_{2} and 1 + 1 = 2, which is a prime. The next pernicious number is 5, since 5 = 101_{2}, followed by 6 (110_{2}), 7 (111_{2}) and 9 (1001_{2}). The sequence of pernicious numbers begins

3, 5, 6, 7, 9, 10, 11, 12, 13, 14, 17, 18, 19, 20, 21, 22, 24, ... (sequence A052294 in the OEIS).

== Properties ==
No power of two is a pernicious number. This is trivially true, because powers of two in binary form are represented as a one followed by zeros. So each power of two has a Hamming weight of one, and one is not considered to be a prime. On the other hand, every number of the form $2^n+1$ with $n>1$, including every Fermat number, is a pernicious number. This is because the sum of the digits in binary form is 2, which is a prime number.

A Mersenne number $2^n-1$ has a binary representation consisting of $n$ ones, and is pernicious when $n$ is prime. Every Mersenne prime is a Mersenne number for prime $n$, and is therefore pernicious. By the Euclid–Euler theorem, the even perfect numbers take the form $2^{n-1}(2^n-1)$ for a Mersenne prime $2^n-1$; the binary representation of such a number consists of a prime number $n$ of ones, followed by $n-1$ zeros. Therefore, every even perfect number is pernicious.

== Related numbers ==
- Odious numbers are numbers with an odd number of 1s in their binary expansion (OEIS: A000069).
- Evil numbers are numbers with an even number of 1s in their binary expansion (OEIS: A001969).
