= Largest prime =

Largest prime may refer to:

- Euclid's theorem, a statement that there are infinitely many prime numbers, and therefore no absolute largest
- Largest known prime number, the record-holder currently or historically

== See also ==
- Mersenne prime
