= Double Mersenne number =

Number of form 2^(2^p-1)-1 with prime exponent

In mathematics, a double Mersenne number is a Mersenne number of the form $M_{M_p} = 2^{2^p-1}-1$ where $p$ is prime.

== Examples ==
The first four terms of the sequence of double Mersenne numbers are (sequence A077586 in the OEIS):

$$M_{M_2} = M_3 = 7$$
$$M_{M_3} = M_7 = 127$$
$$M_{M_5} = M_{31} = 2147483647$$
$$M_{M_7} = M_{127} = 170141183460469231731687303715884105727$$

== Double Mersenne primes ==
Double Mersenne primes
- No. of known terms: 4
- Conjectured no. of terms: 4
- First terms: 7, 127, 2147483647
- Largest known term: 170141183460469231731687303715884105727
- OEIS index: A077586; a(n) = 2^(2^prime(n) − 1) − 1

A double Mersenne number that is prime is called a double Mersenne prime. Since a Mersenne number M_{p} can be prime only if p is prime, (see Mersenne prime for a proof), a double Mersenne number $M_{M_p}$ can be prime only if M_{p} is itself a Mersenne prime. For the first values of p for which M_{p} is prime, $M_{M_{p}}$ is known to be prime for p = 2, 3, 5, and 7 while explicit factors of $M_{M_{p}}$ have been found for p = 13, 17, 19, and 31.

$p$	$M_{p} = 2^p-1$	$M_{M_{p}} = 2^{2^p-1}-1$	factorization of $M_{M_{p}}$
2	3	prime	7
3	7	prime (triple)	127
5	31	prime	2147483647
7	127	prime (quadruple)	170141183460469231731687303715884105727
11	not prime	not prime	47 × 131009 × 178481 × 724639 × 2529391927 × 70676429054711 × 618970019642690137449562111 × ...
13	8191	not prime	338193759479 × 210206826754181103207028761697008013415622289 × ...
17	131071	not prime	231733529 × 64296354767 × ...
19	524287	not prime	62914441 × 5746991873407 × 2106734551102073202633922471 × 824271579602877114508714150039 × 65997004087015989956123720407169 × 4565880376922810768406683467841114102689 × ...
23	not prime	not prime	2351 × 4513 × 13264529 × 285212639 × 76899609737 × ...
29	not prime	not prime	1399 × 2207 × 135607 × 622577 × 16673027617 × 52006801325877583 × 4126110275598714647074087 × ...
31	2147483647	not prime (triple mersenne number)	295257526626031 × 87054709261955177 × 242557615644693265201 × 178021379228511215367151 × ...
37	not prime	not prime	
41	not prime	not prime	
43	not prime	not prime	
47	not prime	not prime	
53	not prime	not prime	
59	not prime	not prime	
61	2305843009213693951	unknown	

Thus, the smallest candidate for the next double Mersenne prime is $M_{M_{61}}$, or 2^{2305843009213693951} − 1. Being approximately 1.695×10^{694127911065419641}, this number is far too large for any currently known primality test. It has no prime factor below 1 × 10^{36}. There are probably no other double Mersenne primes than the four known.

Smallest prime factor of $M_{M_{p}}$ (where p is the nth prime) are

7, 127, 2147483647, 170141183460469231731687303715884105727, 47, 338193759479, 231733529, 62914441, 2351, 1399, 295257526626031, 18287, 106937, 863, 4703, 138863, 22590223644617, ... (next term is > 1 × 10^{36}) (sequence A309130 in the OEIS)

== Catalan–Mersenne number conjecture ==
The recursively defined sequence

$$c_0 = 2$$
$$c_{n+1} = 2^{c_n}-1 = M_{c_n}$$

is called the sequence of Catalan–Mersenne numbers. The first terms of the sequence (sequence A007013 in the OEIS) are:

$$c_0 = 2$$
$$c_1 = 2^2-1 = 3$$
$$c_2 = 2^3-1 = 7$$
$$c_3 = 2^7-1 = 127$$
$$c_4 = 2^{127}-1 = 170141183460469231731687303715884105727$$
$$c_5 = 2^{170141183460469231731687303715884105727}-1 \approx 5.45431 \times 10^{51217599719369681875006054625051616349} \approx 10^{10^{37.70942}}$$

Catalan discovered this sequence after the discovery of the primality of $M_{127}=c_4$ by Lucas in 1876.^{p. 22} Catalan conjectured that they are prime "up to a certain limit". Although the first five terms are prime, no known methods can prove that any further terms are prime (in any reasonable time) simply because they are too huge. However, if $c_5$ is not prime, there is a chance to discover this by computing $c_5$ modulo some small prime $p$ (using recursive modular exponentiation). If the resulting residue is zero, $p$ represents a factor of $c_5$ and thus would disprove its primality. Since $c_5$ is a Mersenne number, such a prime factor $p$ would have to be of the form $2kc_4 +1$. Additionally, because $2^n-1$ is composite when $n$ is composite, the discovery of a composite term in the sequence would preclude the possibility of any further primes in the sequence.

If $c_5$ were prime, it would also contradict the New Mersenne conjecture. It is known that $\frac{2^{c_4} + 1}{3}$ is composite, with factor $886407410000361345663448535540258622490179142922169401 = 5209834514912200c_4 + 1$.

== In popular culture ==
In the Futurama movie The Beast with a Billion Backs, the double Mersenne number $M_{M_7}$ is briefly seen in "an elementary proof of the Goldbach conjecture". In the movie, this number is known as a "Martian prime".

== See also ==
- Cunningham chain
- Double exponential function
- Fermat number
- Perfect number
- Wieferich prime
