= 8192 =

← 8191	8192	8193 →
- List of numbers; Integers; ← 0 1k 2k 3k 4k 5k 6k 7k 8k 9k →
- Cardinal: eight thousand one hundred ninety-two
- Ordinal: 8192nd (eight thousand one hundred ninety-second)
- Factorization: 2^{13}
- Divisors: 1, 2, 4, 8, 16, 32, 64, 128, 256, 512, 1024, 2048, 4096, 8192
- Greek numeral: ,ΗΡϞΒ´
- Roman numeral: V̅MMMCXCII, or V̅I̅I̅I̅CXCII
- Binary: 10000000000000_{2}
- Ternary: 102020102_{3}
- Senary: 101532_{6}
- Octal: 20000_{8}
- Duodecimal: 48A8_{12}
- Hexadecimal: 2000_{16}

8192 (eight thousand one hundred [and] ninety-two) is the natural number following 8191 thats a Mersenne prime and preceding 8193.

It is an even composite number and a power of two: $2^{13}$ (2 to the 13th power).

== In mathematics ==
8192 is a Friedman number.

Since 8192 it is two times a sixth power (8192 = 2 × 4^{6}), it is also a Bhaskara twin. That is, 8192 has the property that twice its square is a cube and twice its cube is a square.

== In computing ==
- 8192 (2^{13}) is the maximum number of fragments for IPv4 datagram.
