= Gillies' conjecture =

In number theory, Gillies' conjecture is a conjecture about the distribution of prime factors of Mersenne numbers. It was made by Donald B. Gillies in a 1964 paper in which he also announced the discovery of three new Mersenne primes. The conjecture is a specialization of the prime number theorem and is a refinement of conjectures due to I. J. Good and Daniel Shanks.

Several papers have given empirical support to the conjecture, but it disagrees with the widely accepted (but also open) Lenstra–Pomerance–Wagstaff conjecture.

== The conjecture ==
Let $p$ be a prime number and $M_p=2^p-1$ the corresponding Mersenne prime. If $A < B < \sqrt{M_p}$, as $B/A$ and $M_p \rightarrow \infty$, the number of prime divisors of $M$ in the interval $[A, B]$ is Poisson distributed with expected value

$$\begin{cases}
\log(\log B /\log A) & \text{ if }A \geq 2p, \\[1pt]
\log(\log B/\log 2p) & \text{ if } A < 2p.
\end{cases}$$

The conjecture implies that

1. The number of Mersenne primes less than $x$ is asymptotically $\textstyle\frac{2\log\log x}{\log 2}$.
2. The expected number of Mersenne primes $M_p$ with $x \le p \le 2x$ is $2$.
3. The probability that $M_p$ is prime is $\textstyle\frac{2 \log 2p }{p\log 2}$.

== Incompatibility with Lenstra–Pomerance–Wagstaff conjecture ==
The Lenstra–Pomerance–Wagstaff conjecture gives different values:

1. The number of Mersenne primes less than $x$ is asymptotically $\textstyle\frac{e^\gamma}{\log 2} \log\log x$.
2. The expected number of Mersenne primes $M_p$ with $x \le p \le 2x$ is $e^\gamma$.
3. The probability that $M_p$ is prime is $\textstyle\frac{e^\gamma\log ap}{p\log 2}$, where $a=2$ if $p=3 \!\!\pmod{4}$ and $a=6$ otherwise.

Asymptotically, these values are about 11% smaller.

== Results ==
While Gillie's conjecture remains open, several papers have added empirical support to its validity.
