= Ivan Pervushin =

Russian clergyman and mathematician

Ivan Mikheevich Pervushin
- Иван Михеевич Первушин
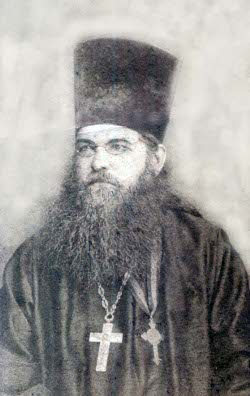
- Born: 27 January [O.S. 15 January] 1827; Lysva, Permsky Uyezd, Perm Governorate, Russian Empire (now Perm Krai, Russian Federation)
- Died: June 30, 1900 (aged 73); Mehonskoe, Shadrinsky Uyezd, Perm Governorate, Russian Empire (now Shatrovsky District, Kurgan Oblast, Russian Federation)
- Citizenship: Russian Empire
- Education: Kazan Theological Academy

Ivan Mikheevich Pervushin (Russian: Иван Михеевич Первушин, sometimes transliterated as Pervusin or Pervouchine) (15 January 1827—17 June 1900) was a Russian clergyman and mathematician of the second half of the 19th century, known for his achievements in number theory. He discovered the ninth perfect number and its odd prime factor, the ninth Mersenne prime. Also, he proved that two Fermat numbers, the 12th and 23rd, were composite.

A contemporary of Pervushin's, writer A. D. Nosilov, wrote: "... this is the modest unknown worker of science ... All of his spacious study is filled up with the different mathematical books, ... here are the books of famous mathematicians: Chebyshev, Legendre, Riemann; not including all modern mathematical publications, which were sent to him by Russian and foreign scientific and mathematical societies. It seemed I was not in a study of the village priest, but in a study of an old mathematics professor ... Besides being a mathematician, he is also a statistician, a meteorologist, and a correspondent".

== Life ==
Ivan Pervushin was born on 27 January [O.S. 15 January] 1827 in Lysva, Permsky Uyezd, Perm Governorate, a district in the east of European Russia. He claimed his birthplace to be the town of Lysva (where his grandfather, John Pervushin, was a priest) but other sources suggest Pashii, in Gornozavodsk. Though, according to recently found archival parish registers of 1827 from Lysva church, he was born in Lysva. He graduated from Kazan clerical academy in 1852. Upon graduation, Pervushin was required to become a priest; he stayed for some time in Perm, then moved to a remote village of Zamaraevo, some 150 miles from Ekaterinburg, where he lived for 25 years.

In Zamaraevo, Pervushin founded a rural school in 1859. He moved to the nearby town of Shadrinsk in 1883, where he published an article that ridiculed the local government. As a punishment, he was exiled to the village of Mehonskoe in 1887.

Ivan Pervushin died on 30 June [O.S. 17 June] 1900 in Mehonskoe at the age of 73.

== Number theory ==
The priest's job provided for Pervushin's life and left him plenty of free time to spend on mathematics. Pervushin was particularly interested in number theory. In 1877 and in the beginning of 1878 he presented two papers to the Russian Academy of Sciences. In these papers, he proved that the 12th and 23rd Fermat numbers are composite:

$2^{2^{12}} + 1$ is divisible by $7\times2^{14}+1=114689$

and

$2^{2^{23}} + 1$ is divisible by $5\times2^{25}+1=167772161.$

In 1883 Pervushin demonstrated that the number

$$2^{61}-1 = 2305843009213693951$$

is a Mersenne prime, and that correspondingly

$$2^{60}(2^{61}-1) = 2658455991569831744654692615953842176$$

is a perfect number. At the time, these were the second largest known prime number, and the second largest known perfect number, after $2^{127}-1$ and $2^{126}(2^{127}-1)$, proved prime and perfect by Édouard Lucas seven years earlier. They remained the second largest until 1911, when Ralph Ernest Powers proved that $2^{89}-1$ is prime and $2^{88}(2^{89}-1)$ is perfect.

Pervushin was a contributor to the International World Congress of Mathematicians of 1893, a part of the World's Columbian Exposition in Chicago that became a precursor to the later International Congresses of Mathematicians. However, he did not attend.
