= Renate Scheidler =

German and Canadian computational number theorist

Renate Scheidler (born 1960) is a German and Canadian mathematician and computer scientist specializing in computational number theory and its applications in cryptography. She is a professor at the University of Calgary, in the Department of Mathematics & Statistics and the Department of Computer Science. She is the co-editor-in-chief of Contributions to Discrete Mathematics and one of the founders of the Women in Number Theory research community and the Women in Numbers conference series.

== Education and career ==
Scheidler was born in 1960. She earned a diplom (the German equivalent of a combined bachelor's and master's degree) in mathematics at the University of Cologne in 1987. She first came to Canada for doctoral study in mathematics at the University of Manitoba, where she completed her Ph.D. in 1993. Her dissertation, Applications of Algebraic Number Theory to Cryptography, was supervised by Hugh C. Williams.

She joined the mathematics faculty at the University of Delaware in 1993, adding a courtesy appointment in the university's Department of Computer & Information Sciences in 1995. She was promoted to associate professor there in 1999. In 2001 she moved to her present position, jointly appointed to the Department of Mathematics & Statistics and the Department of Computer Science at the University of Calgary; she has been a full professor since 2008. In 2022 she was Helene Lange Visiting Professor at the University of Oldenburg in Germany.

In 2008, with Kristin Lauter and Rachel Justine Pries, she became one of the founders of the Women in Numbers conference, which became the first of a series of conferences for the Women in Number Theory research community. She has been co-editor-in-chief of Contributions to Discrete Mathematics since 2023.

== Recognition ==
Scheidler was named as a Fellow of the Association for Women in Mathematics in 2022, recognizing her "for her vision and role in founding the Women in Numbers Research Network; for her continuing leadership in that research community; and for impactful work mentoring women at all career stages". In 2025, she was elected as a Fellow of the Canadian Mathematical Society.

She is the 2024 recipient of the Krieger–Nelson Prize, given "in recognition of her important and significant contributions to research, particularly in the fields of computational number theory and algebraic number theory".
