= Harry L. Nelson =

American mathematician and computer programmer (born 1932)

- Born: January 8, 1932 (age 94); Topeka, Kansas
- Known for: Co-creation of "Cray Blitz"

Harry Lewis Nelson (born January 8, 1932) is an American mathematician and computer programmer. He was a member of the team that won the World Computer Chess Championship in 1983 and 1986, and was a co-discoverer of the 27th Mersenne prime in 1979 (at the time, the largest known prime number). He also served as editor of the Journal of Recreational Mathematics for five years. Most of his professional career was spent at Lawrence Livermore National Laboratory where he worked with some of the earliest supercomputers. He was particularly noted as one of the world's foremost experts in writing optimized assembly language routines for the Cray-1 and Cray X-MP computers. Nelson had a lifelong interest in puzzles of all types, and founded the MiniMax Game Company, a small venture that helps puzzle inventors to develop and market their products.

In 1994, Nelson donated his correspondence from his days as editor of the Journal of Recreational Mathematics to the University of Calgary Library as part of the Eugène Strens Recreational Mathematics Special Collection.

== Biography ==
=== Early years ===
Nelson was born on January 8, 1932, in Topeka, Kansas, the third of four children. He attended local schools and was active in the Boy Scouts, earning the rank of Eagle Scout. Nelson attended Harvard University as a freshman, but then had to drop out for financial reasons. He attended the University of Kansas as a sophomore, but was able to return to Harvard for his junior and senior years, receiving a bachelor's degree in mathematics from Harvard in 1953. In 1952, just before the start of his senior year, he married his high school sweetheart, Claire (née Rachael Claire Ensign). After graduating, he was inducted into the U.S. Army, but was never deployed overseas. He was honorably discharged in 1955, having attained the rank of sergeant. He enrolled in graduate studies at the University of Kansas, earning a master's degree in mathematics in 1957. It was during this period that he became fascinated by the then-new programmable digital computer. Nelson worked towards a Ph.D. until 1959, but the combination of his GI Bill educational benefits running out, needing to support a wife and three children, and the mathematics department rejecting his proposal to do his thesis on computers convinced him to leave the university without completing his Ph.D., and to get a job.

Initially, Nelson worked for Autonetics, an aerospace company in southern California. In 1960 he went to work for the Lawrence Radiation Laboratory (later renamed Lawrence Livermore National Laboratory or LLNL), in Livermore, California. He remained working there until his retirement in 1991. Nelson worked on a variety of computers at LLNL, beginning with the IBM 7030 (nicknamed Stretch). In the 1960s, early units of a new computer were typically delivered as "bare metal," i.e. no software of any kind, including no compiler and no operating system. Programs needed to be written in assembly language, and the programmer needed to have intimate and detailed knowledge of the machine. A lifelong puzzle enthusiast, Nelson sought to understand every detail of the hardware, and earned a reputation as an expert on the features and idiosyncrasies of each new machine. Over time he became the principal person at LLNL in charge of doing acceptance testing of new hardware.

=== 27th Mersenne prime ===
During the process of acceptance testing, a new supercomputer would typically run diagnostic programs at night to ensure stability and reliability of its hardware and controlling software. During the acceptance testing of LLNL's first Cray-1 computer, Nelson teamed up with Cray employee David Slowinski to devise a program that would hunt for the next Mersenne prime, while simultaneously being a legitimate diagnostic program. On April 8, 1979, the team found the 27th Mersenne prime: 2^{44497} - 1, the largest prime number known at that time.

=== Computer chess ===
In 1980, Nelson came across a copy of the chess program Cray Blitz written by Robert Hyatt. Using his detailed knowledge of the Cray-1 architecture, Nelson re-wrote a key routine in assembly language and was able to significantly speed up the program. The two began collaborating along with a third team member, Albert Gower, a strong correspondence chess player. In 1983, Cray Blitz won the World Computer Chess Championship, and successfully defended its title in 1986.

The 1986 Championship was marred by controversy when the HiTech team, led by Hans Berliner, accused the Cray Blitz team of cheating. The charge was investigated for a few months by the tournament director, David Levy, and dismissed. Despite the dismissal, the experience somewhat soured the computer chess scene for Nelson, although he remained active until the ACM discontinued the annual computer chess tournaments in 1994.

== Puzzles and problems ==
Nelson was active with the International Puzzle Party, and was a longtime contributor to the Journal of Recreational Mathematics. He served as Editor of the Journal for 5 years, and sat on its editorial board for many years after stepping down as Editor.
