= Williams number =

Class of numbers in number theory

In number theory, a Williams number base b is a natural number of the form $(b-1) \cdot b^n-1$ for integers b ≥ 2 and n ≥ 1. The Williams numbers base 2 are exactly the Mersenne numbers.

A Williams prime is a Williams number that is prime. They were considered by Hugh C. Williams.

It is conjectured that for every b ≥ 2, there are infinitely many Williams primes for base b.

== See also ==
- Thabit number
