= 2,147,483,647 =

2147483647
- List of numbers; Integers; ← 10^{0} 10^{1} 10^{2} 10^{3} 10^{4} 10^{5} 10^{6} 10^{7} 10^{8} 10^{9} 10^{10} 10^{11} 10^{12} 10^{13}
- Cardinal: two billion one hundred forty-seven million four hundred eighty-three thousand six hundred forty-seven
- Ordinal: 2147483647th (two billion one hundred forty-seven million four hundred eighty-three thousand six hundred forty-seventh)
- Factorization: prime
- Prime: 105,097,565th
- Greek numeral: $\stackrel{\kappa\alpha\delta\psi\mu\eta}{\Mu}$͵γχμζ´
- Roman numeral: N/A, n/a
- Binary: 1111111111111111111111111111111_{2}
- Ternary: 12112122212110202101_{3}
- Senary: 553032005531_{6}
- Octal: 17777777777_{8}
- Duodecimal: 4BB2308A7_{12}
- Hexadecimal: 7FFFFFFF_{16}

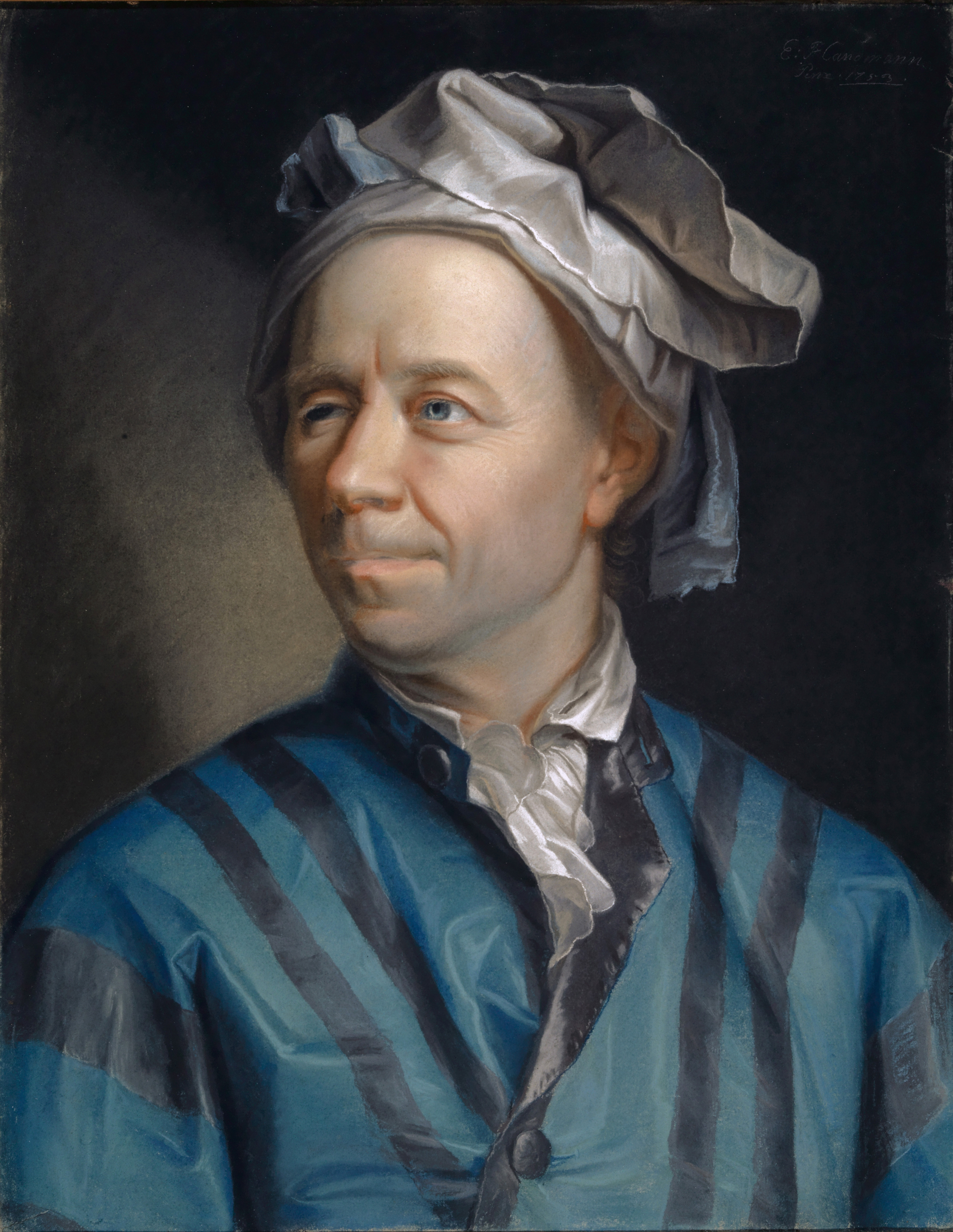
By 1772, Leonhard Euler had proven that 2,147,483,647 is a prime.

The number 2147483647 (Note: Pronounced two billion one hundred forty-seven million four hundred eighty-three thousand six hundred forty-seven.) is the eighth Mersenne prime, equal to 2^{31} − 1. It is one of only four known double Mersenne primes.

The primality of this number was proven by Leonhard Euler, who reported the proof in a letter to Daniel Bernoulli written in 1772. Euler used trial division, improving on Pietro Cataldi's method, so that at most 372 divisions were needed. It thus improved upon the previous record-holding prime, 6,700,417 – also discovered by Euler – forty years earlier. The number 2,147,483,647 remained the largest known prime until 1867.

In computing, this number is the largest value that a signed 32-bit integer field can hold.

== Barlow's prediction ==
At the time of its discovery, 2,147,483,647 was the largest known prime number. In 1811, Peter Barlow wrote (in An Elementary Investigation of the Theory of Numbers):

Euler ascertained that 2^{31} − 1 = 2147483647 is a prime number; and this is the greatest at present known to be such, and, consequently, the last of the above perfect numbers [i.e., 2^{30}(2^{31} − 1)], which depends upon this, is the greatest perfect number known at present, and probably the greatest that ever will be discovered; for as they are merely curious, without being useful, it is not likely that any person will attempt to find one beyond it.

He repeated this prediction in his work from 1814, A New Mathematical and Philosophical Dictionary. In 1867, the number 3,203,431,780,337 was proven to be prime.

== In computing ==
The number 2,147,483,647 (or hexadecimal 7FFFFFFF_{16}) is the maximum positive value for a 32-bit signed binary integer in computing. It is therefore the maximum value for variables declared as integers (e.g., as int) in many programming languages.

The data type time_t, used on operating systems such as Unix, is a signed integer counting the number of seconds since the start of the Unix epoch (midnight UTC of 1 January 1970), and is often implemented as a 32-bit integer. The latest time that can be represented in this form is 03:14:07 UTC on Tuesday, 19 January 2038 (corresponding to 2,147,483,647 seconds since the start of the epoch). This means that systems using a 32-bit time_t type are susceptible to the Year 2038 problem.

On 1 January 2022, a bug was reported for Microsoft Exchange systems where email delivery would fail. An internal malware scanner (enabled by default since 2013) used the date and time as a signed 32-bit integer. The integer would change during the new year to 2,201,010,001 (with the first two digits representing the year), surpassing the maximum value for this data type.

=== In video games ===
The number 2,147,483,647 often becomes a hard limit for various statistics in video games, such as points or money, if they are represented by signed 32-bit integers (rather than floating-point, double-precision or arbitrary-precision). Going over this limit by legitimate means, or by modding or hacking the game, results in many different outcomes caused by integer overflow. The most common outcome is the number "wrapping" into the negatives. Another potential outcome is game crashing, thus meaning there was no failsafe implemented in the event the value exceeds the signed 32-bit limit—generally if the underlying engine has undefined behavior, instead of a wraparound behavior, for integer overflow. A well-known example in video games is that of Old School RuneScape and Grand Theft Auto V, where the number is used as the maximum amount of coins (or any other item) that a player can hold at once with normal methods, known as a "max cash stack". In similar cases, where an unsigned instead of signed 32-bit integer is used, the limit might be extended to 4,294,967,295.
