= Hugh C. Williams =

Canadian mathematician (born 1943)

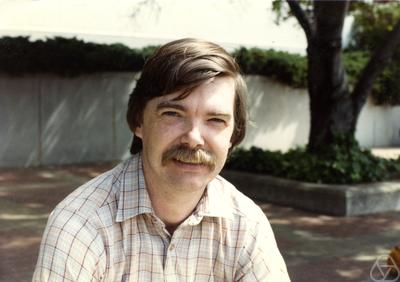
- Williams in 1984
- Born: 23 July 1943 (age 83); London, Ontario, Canada
- Education: University of Waterloo
- Occupation: Mathematician
- Scientific career
- Fields: Number theory; Cryptography
- Institutions: York University; University of Manitoba; University of Calgary
- Thesis: A Generalization of the Lucas Functions (1969)
- Doctoral advisors: Ronald C. Mullin; Ralph Gordon Stanton
- Doctoral students: Renate Scheidler

Hugh Cowie Williams (born 23 July 1943) is a Canadian mathematician. He deals with number theory and cryptography.

== Early life ==
Williams studied mathematics at the University of Waterloo (bachelor's degree 1966, master's degree 1967), where he received his doctorate in 1969 in computer science under Ronald C. Mullin and Ralph Gordon Stanton (A generalization of the Lucas functions). He was a post-doctoral student at York University.

== Career ==
In 1970 he became assistant professor at the University of Manitoba, where in 1972 he attained associate professor status and professor in 1979.

In 2001 he became a professor at the University of Calgary, and professor emeritus since 2004. Since 2001 he has held the "iCore Chair" in Algorithmic Number Theory and Cryptography.

Together with Rei Safavi-Naini he heads the Institute for Security, Privacy and Information Assurance (ISPIA) - formerly Centre for Information Security and Cryptography - at Calgary. Between 1998 and 2001 he was an adjunct professor at the University of Waterloo. He was a visiting scholar at the University of Bordeaux, at Macquarie University and at University of Leiden. From 1978 to January 2007 he was associate editor of the journal Mathematics of Computation.

Among other things Williams dealt with primality tests; Williams primes were named for him. He developed custom hardware for number-theoretical calculations, for example the MSSU in 1995. In cryptography, he developed in 1994 with Renate Scheidler and Johannes Buchmann a method of public key cryptography based on real quadratic number fields. Williams developed algorithms for calculating invariants of algebraic number fields such as class numbers and regulators.

Williams deals with math history and wrote a book about the history of primality tests. In it, he showed among other things that Édouard Lucas worked shortly before his early death on a test similar to today's elliptic curve method. He reconstructed the method that Fortuné Landry used in 1880 (at the age of 82) to factor the sixth Fermat number (a 20-digit number).

Together with Jeffrey Shallit and François Morain he discovered a forgotten mechanical number sieve created by Eugène Olivier Carissan, the first such device from the beginning of the 20th century (1912), and described it in detail.

== Publications ==
- The influence of computers in the development of number theory. In: Computational Mathematics with Applications. Band 8, 1982, S. 75–93.
- Factoring on a computer. Mathematical Intelligencer, 1984, Nr. 3.
- with Attila Pethö, Horst-Günter Zimmer, Michael Pohst (Hrsg.): Computational Number Theory. de Gruyter 1991.
- with J. O. Shallit: Factoring integers before computers. In: W. Gautschi (Hrsg.): Mathematics of computation – 50 years of computational mathematics 1943–1993. Proc. Symposium Applied Math., Band 48. American Mathematical Society, 1994, S. 481–531.
- Édouard Lucas and primality testing. Wiley 1998. (Canadian Mathematical Society Series of Monographs and Advanced Texts. Band 22.)
- with M. J. Jacobson: Solving the Pell Equation. Springer 2008.
