= Mersenne conjectures =

Mathematical conjectures about Mersenne primes

In mathematics, the Mersenne conjectures concern the characterization of a kind of prime numbers called Mersenne primes, meaning prime numbers that are a power of two minus one.

== Original Mersenne conjecture ==
The original, called Mersenne's conjecture, was a statement by Marin Mersenne in his Cogitata Physico-Mathematica (1644; see e.g. Dickson 1919) that the numbers $2^n - 1$ were prime for n = 2, 3, 5, 7, 13, 17, 19, 31, 67, 127 and 257 (sequence A109461 in the OEIS), and were composite for all other positive integers n ≤ 257. The first seven entries of his list ($2^n - 1$ for n = 2, 3, 5, 7, 13, 17, 19) had already been proven to be primes by trial division before Mersenne's time; only the last four entries were new claims by Mersenne. Due to the size of those last numbers, Mersenne did not and could not test all of them, nor could his peers in the 17th century. It was eventually determined, after three centuries and the availability of new techniques such as the Lucas–Lehmer test, that Mersenne's conjecture contained five errors, namely two entries are composite (those corresponding to the primes n = 67, 257) and three primes are missing (those corresponding to the primes n = 61, 89, 107). The correct list for n ≤ 257 is: n = 2, 3, 5, 7, 13, 17, 19, 31, 61, 89, 107 and 127.

While Mersenne's original conjecture is false, it may have led to the New Mersenne conjecture.

== New Mersenne conjecture ==
The New Mersenne conjecture or Bateman, Selfridge and Wagstaff conjecture (Bateman et al. 1989) states that for any odd natural number p, if any two of the following conditions hold, then so does the third:

1. p = 2^{k} ± 1 or p = 4^{k} ± 3 for some natural number k. ((sequence A122834 in the OEIS))
2. 2^{p} − 1 is prime (a Mersenne prime). ((sequence A000043 in the OEIS))
3. (2^{p} + 1)/3 is prime (a Wagstaff prime). ((sequence A000978 in the OEIS))

If p is an odd composite number, then 2^{p} − 1 and (2^{p} + 1)/3 are both composite. Therefore it is only necessary to test primes to verify the truth of the conjecture.

Currently, there are nine known numbers for which all three conditions hold: 3, 5, 7, 13, 17, 19, 31, 61, 127 (sequence A107360 in the OEIS). Bateman et al. expected that no number greater than 127 satisfies all three conditions, and showed that heuristically no greater number would even satisfy two conditions, which would make the New Mersenne conjecture trivially true.

If at least one of the double Mersenne numbers MM61 and MM127 is prime, then the New Mersenne conjecture would be false, since both M61 and M127 satisfy the first condition (since they are Mersenne primes themselves), but (2^M61+1)/3 and (2^M127+1)/3 are both composite, they are divisible by 1328165573307087715777 and 886407410000361345663448535540258622490179142922169401, respectively.

As of 2026, all the Mersenne primes up to 2^{82589933} − 1 are known, and for none of these does the first condition or the third condition hold except for the ones just mentioned. Primes which satisfy at least one condition are

2, 3, 5, 7, 11, 13, 17, 19, 23, 31, 43, 61, 67, 79, 89, 101, 107, 127, 167, 191, 199, 257, 313, 347, 521, 607, 701, 1021, 1279, 1709, 2203, 2281, 2617, 3217, 3539, 4093, 4099, 4253, 4423, 5807, 8191, 9689, 9941, ... (sequence A120334 in the OEIS)

Note that the two primes for which the original Mersenne conjecture is false (67 and 257) satisfy the first condition of the new conjecture (67 = 4^{3} + 3, 257 = 2^{8} + 1), but not the other two. 89 and 107, which were missed by Mersenne, satisfy the second condition but not the other two. Mersenne may have thought that 2^{p} − 1 is prime only if p = 2^{k} ± 1 or p = 4^{k} ± 3 for some natural number k, but if he thought it was "if and only if" he would have included 61.

Status of new Mersenne conjecture for the first 100 primes
2	3	5	7	11	13	17	19	23	29
31	37	41	43	47	53	59	61	**67**	71
73	79	83	89	97	101	103	107	109	113
127	131	137	139	149	151	157	163	167	173
179	181	191	193	197	199	211	223	227	229
233	239	241	251	**257**	263	269	271	277	281
283	293	307	311	313	317	331	337	347	349
353	359	367	373	379	383	389	397	401	409
419	421	431	433	439	443	449	457	461	463
467	479	487	491	499	503	509	521	523	541

Red: p is of the form 2^{n}±1 or 4^{n}±3	Cyan background: 2^{p}−1 is prime	Italics: (2^{p}+1)/3 is prime	**Bold: p satisfies at least one condition**

The New Mersenne conjecture can be thought of as an attempt to salvage the centuries-old Mersenne's conjecture, which is false. However, according to Robert D. Silverman, John Selfridge agreed that the New Mersenne conjecture is "obviously true" as it was chosen to fit the known data and counter-examples beyond those cases are exceedingly unlikely. It may be regarded more as a curious observation than as an open question in need of proving.

Prime Pages shows that the New Mersenne conjecture is true for all integers less than or equal to 10000000 by systematically listing all primes for which it is already known that one of the conditions holds. In fact, currently it is known that the New Mersenne conjecture is true for all integers less than or equal to the current search limit of the Mersenne primes (see this page for the current search limit of the Mersenne primes), also currently it is known that the New Mersenne conjecture is true for all integers less than 1073741827 which satisfy the first condition, also currently it is known that the New Mersenne conjecture is true for all known integers which satisfy the second or third condition.

== Lenstra–Pomerance–Wagstaff conjecture ==
Lenstra, Pomerance, and Wagstaff have conjectured that there are infinitely many Mersenne primes, and, more precisely, that the number of Mersenne primes less than x is asymptotically approximated by

$e^\gamma\cdot\log_2 \log_2(x),$

where γ is the Euler–Mascheroni constant. In other words, the number of Mersenne primes with exponent p less than y is asymptotically

$e^\gamma\cdot\log_2(y).$

This means that there should on average be about $e^\gamma\cdot\log_2(10)$ ≈ 5.92 primes p of a given number of decimal digits such that $M_p$ is prime. The conjecture is fairly accurate for the first 40 Mersenne primes (up to 2^{20,996,011}), but between 2^{20,000,000} and 2^{85,000,000} there are at least 12, rather than the expected number which is around 3.7.

More generally, the number of primes p ≤ y such that $\frac{a^p-b^p}{a-b}$ is prime (where a, b are coprime integers, a > 1, −a < b < a, a and b are not both perfect r-th powers for any natural number r > 1, and −4ab is not a perfect fourth power) is asymptotically

$$(e^\gamma+m\cdot\log_e(2))\cdot\log_a(y).$$

where m is the largest nonnegative integer such that a and −b are both perfect 2^{m}-th powers. The case of Mersenne primes is one case of (a, b) = (2, 1).

== See also ==
- Gillies' conjecture on the distribution of numbers of prime factors of Mersenne numbers
- Lucas–Lehmer primality test
- Lucas primality test
- Catalan's Mersenne conjecture
- Mersenne's laws
