= Ibn Fallus =

Egyptian mathematician (1194–1252)

Shams ad-Din Ibn Fallus al-Ḥanafī al-Māridīnī
- Born: Ismāʽīl ibn-Ibrāhīm ibn-Ġāzī ibn-ʽAlī ibn Muhammad; 1194; Mardin
- Died: 1252 (aged 57–58)
- Other name: Ismāʽīl ibn-Fullūs
- Occupation: Mathematician

Shams ad-Dīn Abû’t-Tāhir Ismāʽīl ibn-Ibrāhīm ibn-Ġāzī ibn-ʽAlī ibn Muhammad al-Ḥanafī al-Māridīnī (1194–1252), often called Ismāʽīl ibn-Fullūs or Ibn Fallus, was an Arab Egyptian mathematician of the Islamic Golden Age. Whilst on pilgrimage to Mecca, he tells of an epitome he wrote on number theory (extant in manuscript), which building on the work of Nicomachus, added three new perfect numbers (33,550,336; 8,589,869,056; and 137,438,691,328) to the four already discovered by the Greeks.

His table also included seven other supposed perfect numbers which are now known to be incorrect. Roshdi Rashed believes the errors emerged from over-reliance on Nicomachus' method.

This work did not reach Europe, and these three perfect numbers were only rediscovered there during the Renaissance, including by Pietro Cataldi.

== See also ==
- Regiomontanus
- Johannes Scheubel
- Pietro Cataldi
