= 8191 (number) =

| ← 8190 | 8191 | 8192 → |
- List of numbers; Integers; ← 0 1k 2k 3k 4k 5k 6k 7k 8k 9k →
- Cardinal: eight thousand one hundred ninety-one
- Ordinal: 8191st (eight thousand one hundred ninety-first)
- Factorization: prime
- Divisors: 1, 8191
- Greek numeral: ,ΗΡϞΑ´
- Roman numeral: V̅MMMCXCI, v̅mmmcxci
- Binary: 1111111111111_{2}
- Ternary: 102020101_{3}
- Senary: 101531_{6}
- Octal: 17777_{8}
- Duodecimal: 48A7_{12}
- Hexadecimal: 1FFF_{16}

8191 (eight thousand one hundred [and] ninety-one) is the natural number following 8190, and preceding 8192. It is also known as M(13). (Note: M(13) is the mathematical notation for the 13th Mersenne prime (M_{p} = 2^{p} − 1) where the exponent number is 13.)

== In mathematics ==
8191 is an odd number and the 1028th prime number. It is also a Jacobsthal-Lucas number. It is a palindrome and repdigit in base 2, which has 13 repeated digits of the number one.

=== Mersenne prime ===
It is most notable for being a Mersenne prime, specifically the fifth one. Since it is a Mersenne prime, it can be expressed as 2^{13} − 1. And since the exponent number is prime, it is considered one. It was discovered anonymously before 1461.

== In astronomy ==
8191 Mersenne is an asteroid located in the main-belt. The asteroid is named after Marin Mersenne, the same person known for his discovery of prime numbers of the form 2^{n-1} and that n is then necessarily also prime, which lead those types of primes being named after him.
