= Curtis Cooper (mathematician) =

American mathematician

- Education: Iowa State
- Scientific career
- Fields: Mathematics, Computer Science
- Workplaces: Central Missouri
- Doctoral advisor: Robert Joe Lambert

Curtis Niles Cooper is an American mathematician who was a professor at the University of Central Missouri, in the Department of Mathematics and Computer Science.

== GIMPS ==
Using software from the GIMPS project, Cooper and Steven Boone found the 43rd known Mersenne prime on their 700 PC cluster on December 15, 2005. The prime, 2^{30,402,457} − 1, is 9,152,052 digits long and is the ninth Mersenne prime for GIMPS.

Cooper and Boone became the first GIMPS contributors to find two primes when they also found the 44th known Mersenne prime, 2^{32,582,657} − 1 (or M_{32,582,657}), which has 9,808,358 digits. This prime was discovered on September 4, 2006, using a PC cluster of over 850 machines. This is the tenth Mersenne prime for GIMPS.

On January 25, 2013, Cooper found his third Mersenne prime of 2^{57,885,161} − 1.

On September 17, 2015, Cooper's computer reported yet another Mersenne prime, 2^{74,207,281} − 1, which was the largest known prime number at 22,338,618 decimal digits. The report was, however, unnoticed until January 7, 2016.

== Areas of research ==
Cooper's own work has mainly been in elementary number theory, especially work related to digital representations of numbers. He collaborated extensively with Robert E. Kennedy. They have worked with Niven numbers, among other results, showing that no 21 consecutive integers can all be Niven numbers, and introduced the notion of tau numbers, numbers whose total number of divisors are itself a divisor of the number. Independent of Kennedy, Cooper has also done work about generalizations of geometric series, and their application to probability.

Cooper is also the editor of the publication Fibonacci Quarterly.
