= Donald B. Gillies =

Canadian computer scientist and mathematician

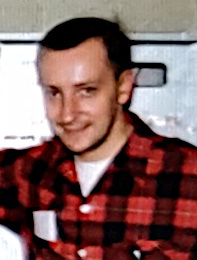
- ca. 1957
- Born: Donald Bruce Gillies; October 15, 1928; Toronto, Ontario, Canada
- Died: July 17, 1975 (aged 46); Urbana, Illinois, US
- Education: University of Toronto; University of Illinois at Urbana-Champaign; Princeton University
- Scientific career
- Fields: Mathematics, Computer Science
- Workplaces: University of Illinois, Stanford University (sabbatical), National Research Development Corporation (UK)
- Doctoral advisor: John von Neumann

Donald Bruce Gillies (October 15, 1928 – July 17, 1975) was a Canadian computer scientist and mathematician who worked in the fields of computer design, game theory, and minicomputer programming environments.

== Early life and education ==
Donald B. Gillies was born in Toronto, Ontario, Canada, to John Zachariah Gillies (a Canadian) and Anne Isabelle Douglas MacQueen (an American). He attended the University of Toronto Schools, a laboratory school originally affiliated with the university. Gillies completed his undergraduate degree at the University of Toronto.

Gillies ranked among the top ten participants in the William Lowell Putnam Mathematical Competition held in 1950.. He was not expected to do so well and was not included in the official University of Toronto team. Meanwhile, admissions for the fall of 1950 had already been determined.

He began his graduate education at the University of Illinois and helped with the checkout of ORDVAC computer in the summer of 1951. Jim Mayberry, a close friend of Gillies from The University of Toronto, encouraged Gillies in his second year to transfer to Princeton to work under John von Neumann. There he developed the first theorems of core (game theory) in his PhD thesis.

== Career ==
Gillies moved to England for two years to work for the National Research Development Corporation. He returned to the US in 1956, married Alice E. Dunkle, and began a job as a professor at the University of Illinois at Urbana-Champaign.

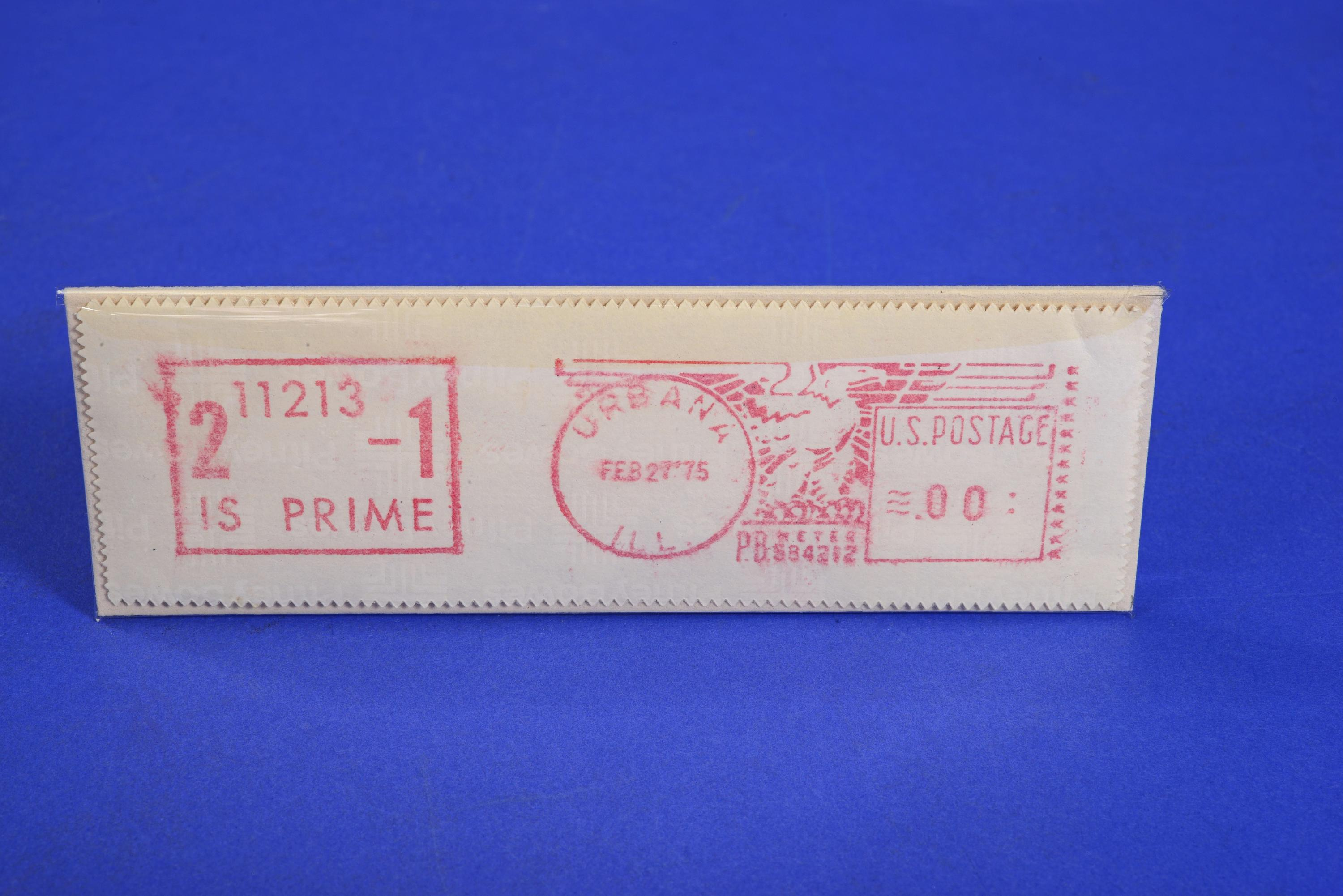
The Math Department at UIUC celebrated the largest of the new primes with a postal meter cancellation stamp — until Appel and Haken proved the Four-color theorem in 1976. This example is from 1975.

Starting in 1957, Gillies designed the three-stage pipeline control of the ILLIAC II supercomputer at the University of Illinois. The pipelined stages were named "advanced control", "delayed control", and "interplay". The work wascompeted with the IBM 7030 Stretch computer and is in the public domain. Gillies presented a talk on ILLIAC II at the University of Michigan Engineering Summer Conference in 1962. During checkout of ILLIAC II, Gillies found three new Mersenne primes (M_{21-23}), one of which was the largest prime number known at the time (M_{23}). For more than a decade after Gillies' discovery all postage originating from the university's Mathematics Department bore a legend announcing that the largest of the three was prime.

In 1969, Gillies launched a project to build the first Pascal compiler written in North America, a fast-turnaround, in-memory, 2-pass compiler. The compiler, for the PDP-11/20 minicomputer, was completed by February 1975.

In 1974, Gillies became the first source code licensee for the Bell Labs UNIX operating system.

== Death and legacy ==
Gillies died unexpectedly at age 46 on July 17, 1975, of a rare viral infection.

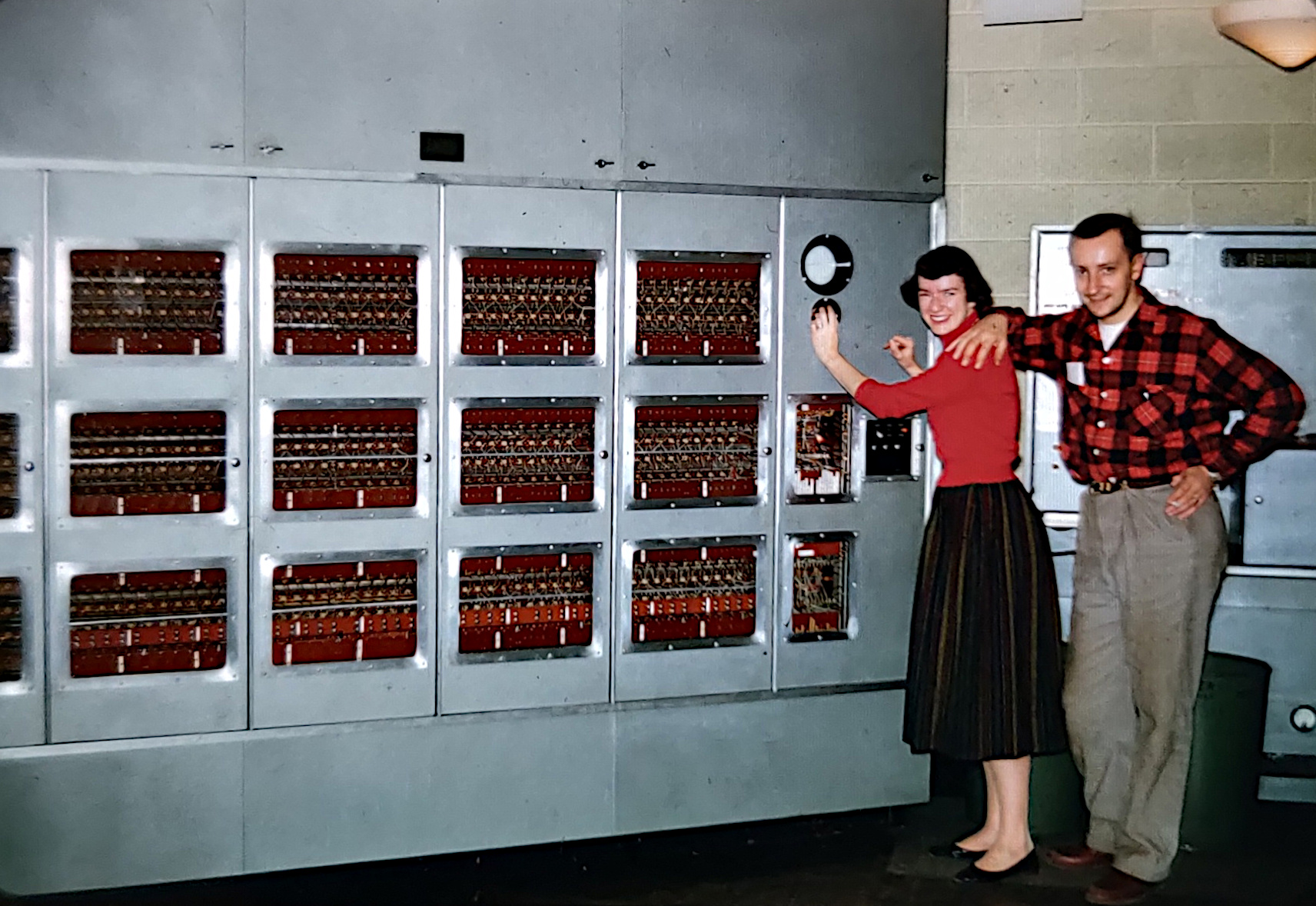
Alice (Betsy) E. D. Gillies and Donald B. Gillies with the ILLIAC I at the Digital Computer Lab, Urbana Illinois, circa 1957

In 1975, the Donald B. Gillies Memorial lecture was established at the University of Illinois, with one leading researcher from computer science appearing every year. The first lecturer was Alan Perlis.

In 2006, the Donald B. Gillies Chair Professorship was established in the Department of Computer Science at the University of Illinois. Vikram Adve was invested as the second chair professor of the endowment in 2018. The Department of Computer Science awarded a Memorial Achievement Award to Gillies in 2011.

== See also ==
- History of computing
- Largest known prime number
