= David Slowinski =

American mathematician

David Slowinski is a mathematician involved in prime numbers. His career highlights have included the discovery of seven Mersenne primes:

- 2^{44497}−1 (M27) (with H. L. Nelson) on April 8, 1979
- 2^{86243}−1 (M28) on September 25, 1982
- 2^{132049}−1 (M30) on September 19, 1983
- 2^{216091}−1 (M31) on September 1, 1985
- 2^{756839}−1 (M32) (with P. Gage) on February 17, 1992
- 2^{859433}−1 (M33) (with P. Gage) on January 4, 1994
- 2^{1257787}−1 (M34) (with P. Gage) on September 3, 1996,

He has also written several textbooks on the subject.

Slowinski was a software engineer for Cray Research.
