= University of Central Missouri =

Public university in Warrensburg, Missouri, US

- Former names: Normal School No. 2 (1871–1919); Central Missouri State Teachers College (1919–1945); Central Missouri State College (1945–1972); Central Missouri State University (1972–2006)
- Motto: Education for Service
- Type: Public university
- Established: 1871; 155 years ago
- Endowment: $42.89 million (2017)
- President: Roger Best
- Provost: Tim Crowley
- Academic staff: 424 full-time and 156 part-time
- Students: 13,734 (spring 2024)
- Undergraduates: 8,019 (spring 2024)
- Postgraduates: 5,715 (spring 2024)
- Location: Warrensburg, Missouri, United States; 38.757°N 93.741°W
- Campus: 1,561 acres (631.7 ha)
- Colors: Cardinal and black
- Nickname: Mules and Jennies
- Sporting affiliations: NCAA Division II – The MIAA
- Mascot: Mo the Mule
- Website: ucmo.edu

The University of Central Missouri (UCM) is a public university in Warrensburg, Missouri, United States.

In 2024, enrollment was 13,734 students from 48 states and 52 countries on its 1,561-acre campus. UCM offers 150 programs of study, including 10 pre-professional programs, 27 areas of teacher certification, and 37 graduate programs.

== History ==
The university was founded in 1871 as Normal School No. 2 and became known as Warrensburg Teachers College. The name was changed to Central Missouri State Teachers College in 1919, Central Missouri State College in 1945 and Central Missouri State University in 1972. In 1965, the institution established a graduate school. In 2006, the name was changed to the University of Central Missouri.

There are 150 majors and minors, 32 professional accreditations and 45 graduate programs. UCM has a high-tech, STEM-focused facility called the Missouri Innovation Campus in Lee's Summit, Missouri and provides numerous online courses and programs.

== Academics ==
The university is considered a Center for Academic Excellence in Cyber Defense.

College of Arts, Humanities, and Social Sciences departments include:

- School of Visual and Performing Arts
  - Music
  - Theatre and Dance
  - Art and Design
- Government, International Studies and Languages
  - Political Science
- English and Philosophy
- History and Anthropology
- Communication and Sociology
- Religious Studies
- Women's Studies

'The Harmon College of Business and Professional Studies' is accredited by AACSB International. Other accreditations include Aviation Accreditation Board International and the Council on Social Work Education. Departments include:

- School of Business Administration
  - Economics, Finance and Marketing
  - School of Accountancy and Computer Information Systems
  - Management
- School of Professional Studies
  - Aviation
  - Criminal Justice
  - Communication Disorders and Social Work
  - Military Science and Leadership

College of Education departments include:

- Career and Technology Education
- Educational Leadership and Human Development
- Educational Foundations and Literacy
- Elementary and Early Childhood Education

College of Health, Science, and Technology academic units include:

- School of Nursing
- School of Industrial Sciences and Technology
- Agriculture
- Biological and Clinical Sciences
- Computer Science and Cybersecurity
- Mathematics, Actuarial Science and Statistics
- Nutrition, Kinesiology and Health
- Occupational Risk and Safety Sciences
- Physical Sciences
- Psychological Science

The Honors College: Benefits of being an Honors College student include early enrollment, one-on-one advising, smaller classes, Honors-only courses and colloquia.

=== GIMPS ===
The University of Central Missouri continues to hold an important role in the Great Internet Mersenne Prime Search. The GIMPS project at UCM is a university-wide effort managed by Curtis Cooper and Steven Boone. As of 2022, UCM's team (curtisc) is currently the 10th place contributor to that project in terms of CPU power devoted to the project, and is the only GIMPS team that has discovered four Mersenne primes: M43 2^{30402457} - 1 with 9,152,052 digits, M44 2^{32582657} - 1 with 9,808,358 digits, M48 2^{57,885,161}-1 with 17,425,170 digits, and M49 2^{74,207,281}-1 with 22,338,618 digits.

== Student life ==
Undergraduate demographics as of fall 2023
Race and ethnicity	Total
White	76%
Black	9%
Hispanic	7%
Two or more races	5%
International student	2%
Asian	1%
Unknown	1%
Economic diversity
Low-income (Note: The percentage of students who received an income-based federal Pell grant intended for low-income students.)	32%
Affluent (Note: The percentage of students who are a part of the American middle class at the bare minimum.)	68%

The university has more than 185 student organizations, with academic, cultural, recreational, community service and special interest clubs and associations. There are more than 20 intramural sports, free movie nights on campus and a bowling alley and movie theater in the student union.

Freshman and sophomore students are required to live in one of the nine residence halls in their first year, to help ease the adjustment from high school to college. Students may also live in one of ten Learning Communities, which places students with the same program of study together in the residence halls.

=== Greek life ===
The University of Central Missouri is home to 26 Greek organizations. Ten percent of UCM students are involved in Greek life.

== Media ==
The UCM newspaper is called The Muleskinner. An online publication called digitalburg.com covers the Johnson County area. These publications are entirely student-operated. The university also houses KMOS-TV.

== Athletics ==
UCM athletic teams compete in the Mid–America Intercollegiate Athletics Association, or MIAA. The athletic division includes basketball, baseball, women's bowling, American football, golf, women's soccer, softball, cross-country, track, volleyball and wrestling. UCM's athletic teams are called Mules (men) and Jennies (women). UCM has two mascots, a costumed anthropomorphic mule named Mo, and live mules named Tammy and Molly.

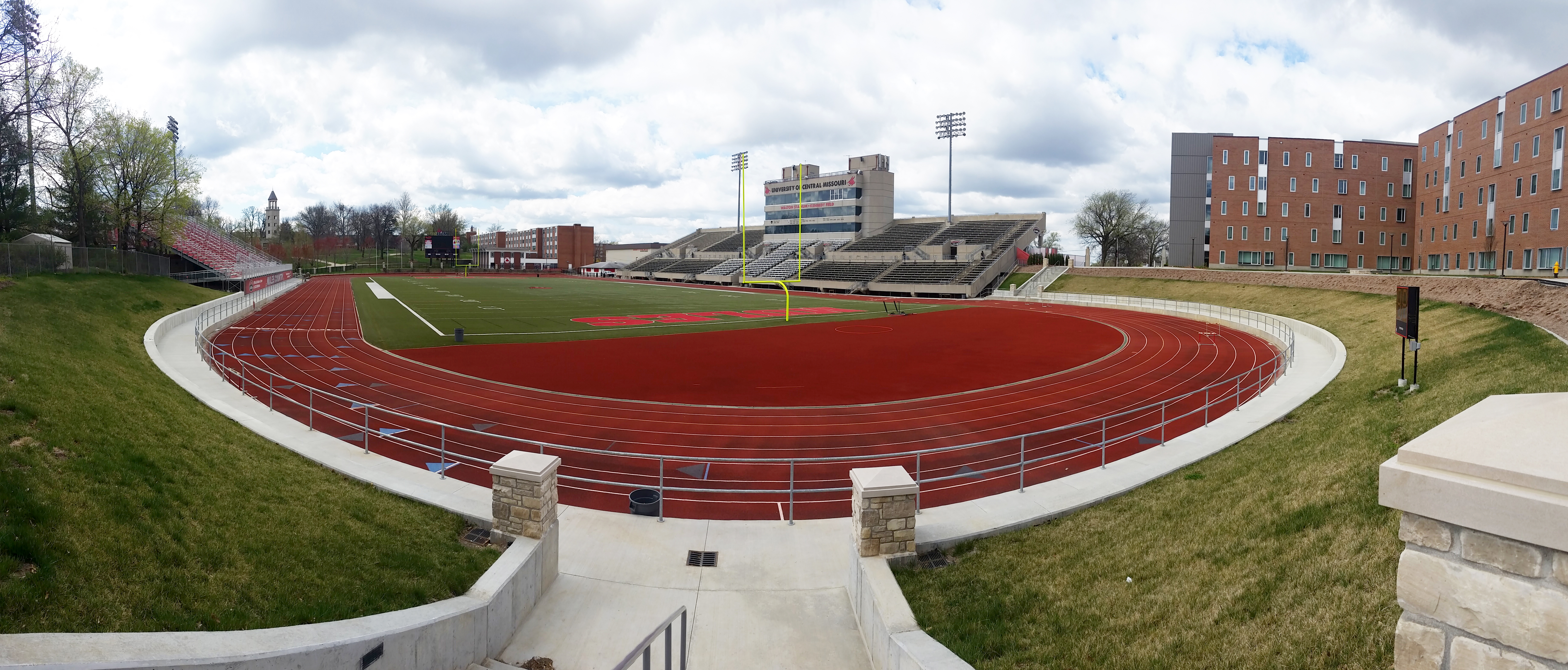
Audrey J. Walton Stadium overlooking the Northeast corner

Basketball games are played in the UCM Multipurpose Building, renamed in February 2024 for longtime athletic director Jerry Hughes as the Jerry M. Hughes Athletics Center. Built in 1976, The Multi, as it is known to students and alumni, has a seating capacity of 6,500 for basketball and volleyball games. Football games are played on Vernon Kennedy Field at Audrey J. Walton Stadium. The stadium was erected in 1928 and underwent a major facelift in 1995. The stadium officially holds 11,000 people, but crowds often approach 12,000.

Keth Memorial Golf Course within Pertle Springs Park on the campus of the University of Central Missouri is an 18-hole grass greens course complete with a fully equipped pro shop. Keth Memorial also is home for UCM golf and cross country competitions.

== Library ==
The James C. Kirkpatrick Library (JCKL) is the library of the University of Central Missouri. It was named for James C. Kirkpatrick, who was secretary of state of Missouri from 1965 to 1985. It includes over 480,000 circulating volumes.
