= Euclid–Euler theorem =

Characterization of even perfect numbers

The Euclid–Euler theorem is a theorem in number theory that relates perfect numbers to Mersenne primes. It states that an even number is perfect if and only if it has the form 2^{p−1}(2^{p} − 1), where 2^{p} − 1 is a prime number. The theorem is named after mathematicians Euclid and Leonhard Euler, who respectively proved the "if" and "only if" aspects of the theorem.

It has been conjectured that there are infinitely many Mersenne primes, although the truth of this conjecture remains unknown. It is equivalent, by the Euclid–Euler theorem, to the conjecture that there are infinitely many even perfect numbers. However, it is also unknown whether there exists even a single odd perfect number.

== Statement and examples ==
A perfect number is a natural number that equals the sum of its proper divisors, the numbers that are less than it and divide it evenly (with remainder zero). For instance, the proper divisors of 6 are 1, 2, and 3, which sum to 6, so 6 is perfect.

A Mersenne prime is a prime number of the form M_{p} = 2^{p} − 1, one less than a power of two. For a number of this form to be prime, p itself must also be prime, but not all primes give rise to Mersenne primes in this way. For instance, 2^{3} − 1 = 7 is a Mersenne prime, but 2^{11} − 1 = 2047 = 23 × 89 is not.

The Euclid–Euler theorem states that an even natural number is perfect if and only if it has the form 2^{p−1}M_{p}, where M_{p} is a Mersenne prime. The perfect number 6 comes from p = 2 in this way, as 2^{2−1}M_{2} = 2 × 3 = 6, and the Mersenne prime 7 corresponds in the same way to the perfect number 28.

== History ==
Euclid proved that 2^{p−1}(2^{p} − 1) is an even perfect number whenever 2^{p} − 1 is prime. This is the final result on number theory in Euclid's Elements; the later books in the Elements instead concern irrational numbers, solid geometry, and the golden ratio. Euclid expresses the result by stating that if a finite geometric series beginning at 1 with ratio 2 has a prime sum q, then this sum multiplied by the last term t in the series is perfect. Expressed in these terms, the sum q of the finite series is the Mersenne prime 2^{p} − 1 and the last term t in the series is the power of two 2^{p−1}. Euclid proves that qt is perfect by observing that the geometric series with ratio 2 starting at q, with the same number of terms, is proportional to the original series; therefore, since the original series sums to q = 2t − 1, the second series sums to q(2t − 1) = 2qt − q, and both series together add to 2qt, two times the supposed perfect number. However, these two series are disjoint from each other and (by the primality of q) exhaust all the divisors of qt, so qt has divisors that sum to 2qt, showing that it is perfect.

Over a millennium after Euclid, Alhazen c. 1000 CE conjectured that every even perfect number is of the form 2^{p−1}(2^{p} − 1) where 2^{p} − 1 is prime, but he was not able to prove this result. It was not until the 18th century, over 2000 years after Euclid, that Leonhard Euler proved that the formula 2^{p−1}(2^{p} − 1) will yield all the even perfect numbers. Thus, there is a one-to-one relationship between even perfect numbers and Mersenne primes; each Mersenne prime generates one even perfect number, and vice versa. After Euler's proof of the Euclid–Euler theorem, other mathematicians have published different proofs, including Victor-Amédée Lebesgue, Robert Daniel Carmichael, Leonard Eugene Dickson, John Knopfmacher, and Wayne L. McDaniel. Dickson's proof, in particular, has been commonly used in textbooks.

This theorem was included in a web listing of the "top 100 mathematical theorems", dating from 1999, which later became used by Freek Wiedijk as a benchmark set to test the power of different proof assistants. As of April 2025, the proof of the Euclid–Euler theorem had been formalized in 7 of the 12 proof assistants recorded by Wiedijk.

== Proof ==
Euler's proof is short and depends on the fact that the sum of divisors function σ is multiplicative; that is, if a and b are any two relatively prime integers, then σ(ab) = σ(a)σ(b). For this formula to be valid, the sum of divisors of a number must include the number itself, not just the proper divisors. A number is perfect if and only if its sum of divisors is twice its value.

=== Sufficiency ===
One direction of the theorem (the part already proved by Euclid) immediately follows from the multiplicative property: every Mersenne prime gives rise to an even perfect number. When 2^{p} − 1 is prime, $\sigma(2^{p-1}(2^p - 1)) = \sigma(2^{p-1})\sigma(2^p - 1).$ The divisors of 2^{p−1} are 1, 2, 4, 8, ..., 2^{p−1}. The sum of these divisors is a geometric series whose sum is 2^{p} − 1. Next, since 2^{p} − 1 is prime, its only divisors are 1 and itself, so the sum of its divisors is 2^{p}.

Combining these,
$$\begin{align}
\sigma(2^{p-1}(2^p - 1)) &= \sigma(2^{p-1})\sigma(2^p - 1) \\
&= (2^p - 1)(2^p) \\
&= 2(2^{p-1})(2^p - 1).
\end{align}$$
Therefore, 2^{p−1}(2^{p} − 1) is perfect.

=== Necessity ===
In the other direction, suppose that an even perfect number has been given, and partially factor it as 2^{k}x, where x is odd. For 2^{k}x to be perfect, the sum of its divisors must be twice its value:

$2^{k+1}x = \sigma(2^k x) = (2^{k+1} - 1)\sigma(x).$	∗

The odd factor 2^{k+1} − 1 on the right side of (∗) is at least 3, and it must divide x, the only odd factor on the left side, so x/(2^{k+1} − 1) is a proper divisor of x. Dividing both sides of (∗) by the common factor 2^{k+1} − 1 and taking into account the known divisors x and x/(2^{k+1} − 1) of x gives

$2^{k+1}x/(2^{k+1}-1) = \sigma(x) = x + x/(2^{k+1}-1) + {}$other divisors${} = 2^{k+1}x/(2^{k+1}-1) + {}$other divisors.

For this equality to be true, there can be no other divisors. Therefore, x/(2^{k+1} − 1) must be 1, and x must be a prime of the form 2^{k+1} − 1.
