= Ralph Ernest Powers =

American mathematician (1875–1952)

Ralph Ernest Powers (April 27, 1875 – January 31, 1952) was an American amateur mathematician who worked on prime numbers.

He is credited with discovering the Mersenne primes M_{89} and M_{107}, in 1911 and 1914 respectively. In 1934 he verified that the Mersenne number M_{241} is composite.

== Life ==
Powers was born in Fountain, Colorado Territory. Details of his life are little-known, though he appears to have been an employee of the Denver and Rio Grande Western Railroad.

Soon after Powers announced the discovery of M_{107}, the Frenchman E. Fauquembergue claimed that he had discovered it earlier, but many of Fauquembergue's other claims were later demonstrated as erroneous; thus, many prefer recognizing Powers as the discoverer, including the well-known Internet resource the PrimePages.

After his own discoveries of Mersenne primes in 1911 and 1914, no Mersenne primes were discovered until Raphael M. Robinson used a computer to find the next two, on January 30, 1952, the night before Powers's death.

== Works ==
- ‘The Tenth Perfect Number', American Mathematical Monthly, Vol. 18 (1911), pp. 195–7
- ’On Mersenne's Numbers', Proceedings of the London Mathematical Society, Vol. 13 (1914), p. xxxix
- 'A Mersenne Prime', Bulletin of the American Mathematical Society, Vol. 20, No. 10 (1914), p. 531
- ’Certain composite Mersenne's numbers', Proceedings of the London Mathematical Society Vol. 15 (1916), p. xxii
- (with D. H. Lehmer) 'On Factoring Large Numbers', Bulletin of the American Mathematical Society, Vol. 37. No. 10 (1931), pp. 770–76
- ’Note on a Mersenne Number', Bulletin of the American Mathematical Society, Vol. 40, No. 12 (1934), p. 883

== See also ==
- Continued fraction factorization
