= Pietro Cataldi =

Italian mathematician (1548–1626)

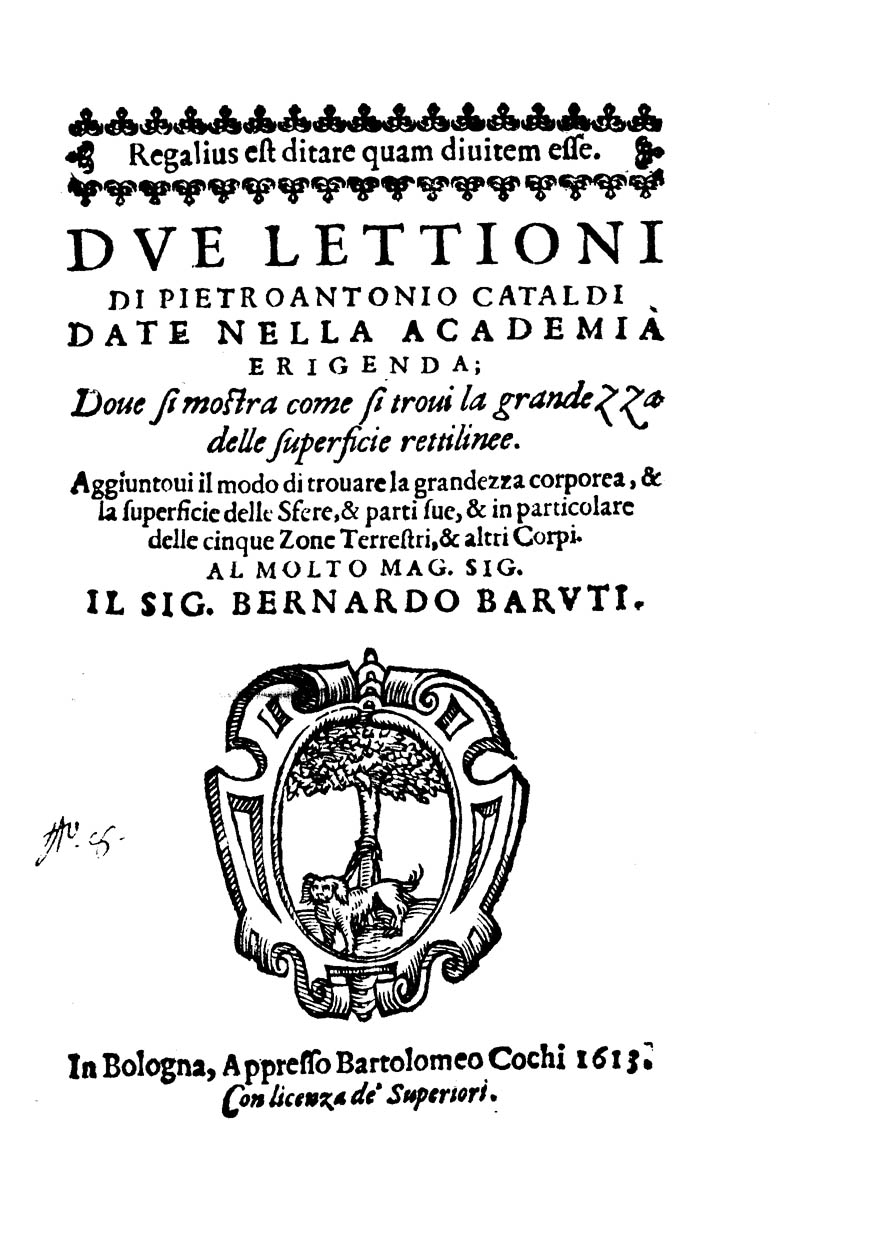
Due lettioni, 1613

Pietro Antonio Cataldi (15 April 1548, Bologna – 11 February 1626, Bologna) was an Italian mathematician. A citizen of Bologna, he taught mathematics and astronomy and also worked on military problems. His work included the development of simple continued fractions and a method for their representation. He was one of many mathematicians who attempted to prove Euclid's fifth postulate.

Cataldi discovered the sixth and seventh perfect numbers by 1588. His discovery of the 6th, that corresponding to p=17 in the formula M_{p}=2^{p}-1, exploded a many-times repeated number-theoretical myth that the perfect numbers had units digits that invariably alternated between 6 and 8. (Until Cataldi, 19 authors going back to Nicomachus are reported to have made the claim, with a few more repeating this afterward, according to L.E.Dickson's History of the Theory of Numbers). Cataldi's discovery of the 7th (for p=19) held the record for the largest known prime for almost two centuries, until Leonhard Euler discovered that 2^{31} − 1 was the eighth Mersenne prime. Although Cataldi incorrectly claimed that p=23, 29, 31 and 37 all also generate Mersenne primes (and perfect numbers), when in fact only p=31 does among those four numbers, his text's clear demonstration shows that he had genuinely established primality through p=19.

== See also ==
- Ibn Fallus, who discovered the sixth and seventh perfect numbers more than 300 years earlier, but also included non-perfect numbers in his list
