= Largest known prime number =

The largest known prime number as of November 2026 is 2^{136,279,841} − 1, a number that has 41,024,320 digits when written in the decimal system. It was found on October 12, 2024, on a cloud-based virtual machine volunteered by Luke Durant, a researcher from San Jose, California, to the Great Internet Mersenne Prime Search (GIMPS).

A plot of the number of digits in the largest known prime by year since the advent of the electronic computer. The vertical scale is logarithmic.

A prime number is a natural number greater than 1 with no divisors other than 1 and itself. Euclid's theorem proves that for any given prime number, there will always be a higher one, and thus there are infinitely many; there is no largest prime.

Many of the largest known primes are Mersenne primes, numbers that are one less than a power of two, because they can be verified by a specialized primality test that is faster than the general one. As of October 2024, the seven largest known primes are Mersenne primes. The last 18 record primes were Mersenne primes. The binary representation of any Mersenne prime is composed of all ones, since the binary form of 2^{k} − 1 is simply k ones.

Finding larger prime numbers is sometimes presented as a means to stronger encryption, but this is not true. While large primes with hundreds of digits are indeed used for cryptography, primes with millions of digits are not.

== Current record ==
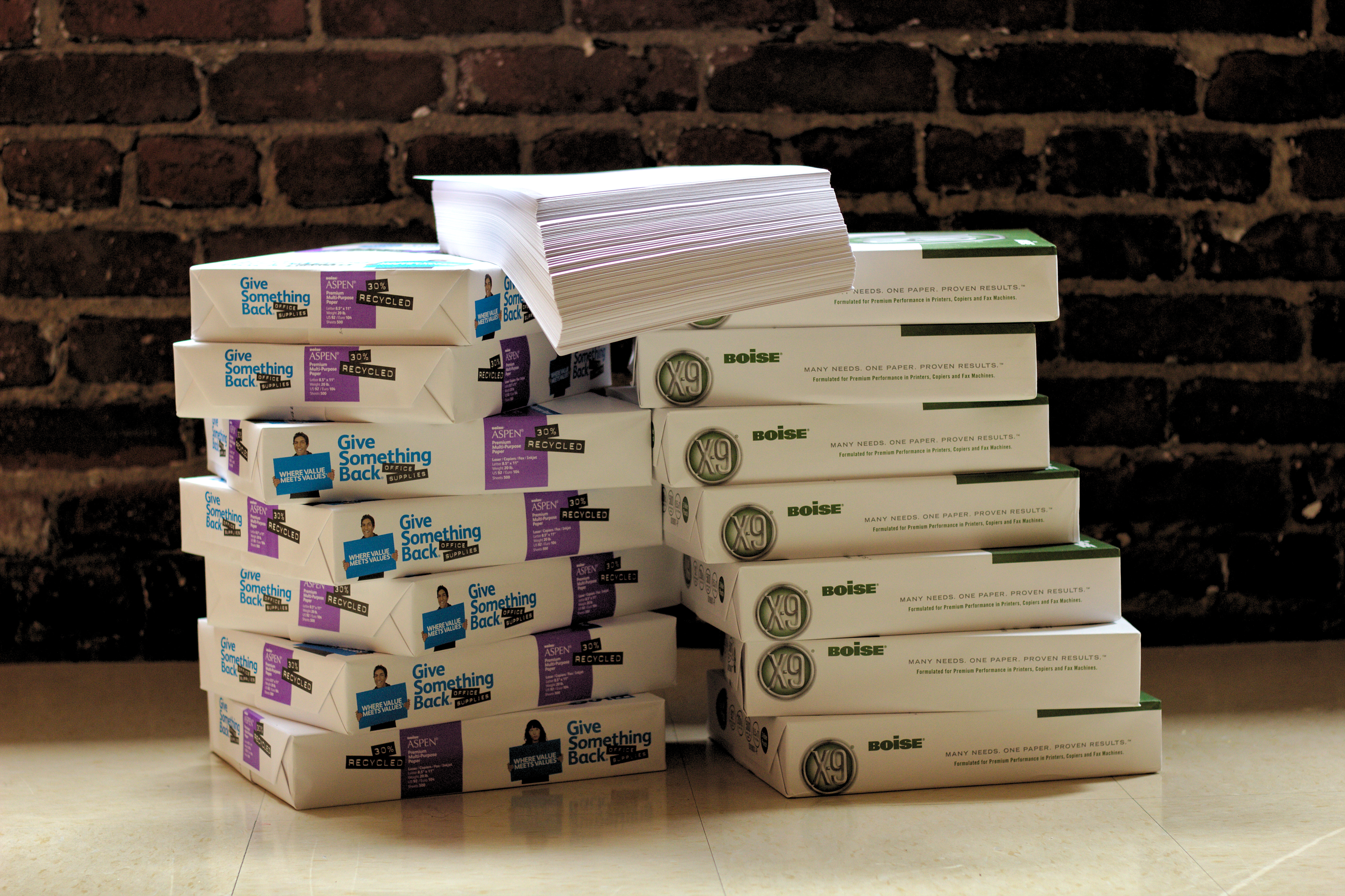
Using standard A4 paper format of 50 lines per page and 75 characters per line, it would require 10,940 single-sided pages to print this prime number, or approximately 22 reams of paper. (15 are shown here.)

The record is held by 2^{136,279,841} − 1 with 41,024,320 digits, found by GIMPS on October 12, 2024. Its first and last 120 digits are:

881694327503833265553939100378117358971207354509066041067156376412422630694756841441725990347723283108837509739959776874...

[41,024,080 digits skipped]

...852806517931459412567957568284228288124096109707961148305849349766085764170715060409404509622104665555076706219486871551

== Prizes ==
The Electronic Frontier Foundation (EFF) offers several prizes for record primes. A prime with one million digits was found in 1999, earning the discoverer a $50,000 prize. In 2008, a ten-million-digit prime won a $100,000 prize and a Cooperative Computing Award from the EFF. Time called this prime the 29th top invention of 2008.

Both these primes were discovered through the Great Internet Mersenne Prime Search (GIMPS), which coordinates long-range search efforts among tens of thousands of computers and thousands of volunteers. The $50,000 prize went to the discoverer and the $100,000 prize went to GIMPS. GIMPS will split the $150,000 prize for the first prime of over 100 million digits with the winning participant. A $250,000 prize awaits the first prime with one billion digits.

GIMPS also offers a $3,000 research discovery award for participants who discover a new Mersenne prime of fewer than 100 million digits.

== History ==
Commemorative postmark used by the UIUC Math Department after proving that M_{11213} is prime

The following table lists the progression of the largest known prime number in ascending order. Here M_{p} = 2^{p} − 1 is the Mersenne number with exponent p, where p is a prime number. The longest record-holder was M_{19} = 524,287, which held the record for 184 years.

The primes up to and including $\tfrac{2^{148}+1}{17}$ were found without a computer, while the primes starting with 180×(M_{127})^{2}+1 were found using computers.

GIMPS volunteers found the 16 latest records, all of them Mersenne primes. They were found on ordinary personal computers until the most recent one, found by ex-Nvidia employee Luke Durant using a network of thousands of dedicated graphics processing units (GPUs). Durant spent about a year and $2 million on the hunt. This is the first time a Mersenne prime has been discovered using GPUs instead of central processing units (CPUs).

Largest known prime by year
Number	Digits	Year found	Discoverer
M_{17}	6	1588	Pietro Cataldi
M_{19}	6	1588	Pietro Cataldi
M_{31}	10	1772	Leonhard Euler
$\mathsf{\tfrac{M_{59}}{179951}}$	13	1867	Fortuné Landry
M_{127}	39	1876	Édouard Lucas
$\mathsf{\tfrac{2^{148}+1}{17}}$	44	1951	Aimé Ferrier, with a mechanical calculator. The largest record not set by computer.
180×(M_{127})^{2}+1	79	1951	J. C. P. Miller and D. J. Wheeler using Cambridge's EDSAC computer
M_{521}	157	1952	Raphael M. Robinson
M_{607}	183	1952	Raphael M. Robinson
M_{1279}	386	1952	Raphael M. Robinson
M_{2203}	664	1952	Raphael M. Robinson
M_{2281}	687	1952	Raphael M. Robinson
M_{3217}	969	1957	Hans Riesel
M_{4423}	1,332	1961	Alexander Hurwitz
M_{9689}	2,917	1963	Donald B. Gillies
M_{9941}	2,993	1963	Donald B. Gillies
M_{11213}	3,376	1963	Donald B. Gillies
M_{19937}	6,002	1971	Bryant Tuckerman
M_{21701}	6,533	1978	Laura A. Nickel and Landon Curt Noll
M_{23209}	6,987	1979	Landon Curt Noll
M_{44497}	13,395	1979	David Slowinski and Harry L. Nelson
M_{86243}	25,962	1982	David Slowinski
M_{132049}	39,751	1983	David Slowinski
M_{216091}	65,050	1985	David Slowinski
391581×2^{216193}−1	65,087	1989	The "Amdahl Six": John Brown, Landon Curt Noll, B. K. Parady, Gene Ward Smith, Joel F. Smith, Sergio E. Zarantonello. Largest non-Mersenne prime that was the largest known prime when it was discovered.
M_{756839}	227,832	1992	David Slowinski and Paul Gage
M_{859433}	258,716	1994	David Slowinski and Paul Gage
M_{1257787}	378,632	1996	David Slowinski and Paul Gage
M_{1398269}	420,921	1996	GIMPS, Joel Armengaud
M_{2976221}	895,932	1997	GIMPS, Gordon Spence
M_{3021377}	909,526	1998	GIMPS, Roland Clarkson
M_{6972593}	2,098,960	1999	GIMPS, Nayan Hajratwala
M_{13466917}	4,053,946	2001	GIMPS, Michael Cameron
M_{20996011}	6,320,430	2003	GIMPS, Michael Shafer
M_{24036583}	7,235,733	2004	GIMPS, Josh Findley
M_{25964951}	7,816,230	2005	GIMPS, Martin Nowak
M_{30402457}	9,152,052	2005	GIMPS, University of Central Missouri professors Curtis Cooper and Steven Boone
M_{32582657}	9,808,358	2006	GIMPS, Curtis Cooper and Steven Boone
M_{43112609}	12,978,189	2008	GIMPS, Edson Smith
M_{57885161}	17,425,170	2013	GIMPS, Curtis Cooper
M_{74207281}	22,338,618	2016	GIMPS, Curtis Cooper
M_{77232917}	23,249,425	2017	GIMPS, Jonathan Pace
M_{82589933}	24,862,048	2018	GIMPS, Patrick Laroche
M_{136279841}	41,024,320	2024	GIMPS, Luke Durant

== Twenty largest ==
A list of the 5,000 largest known primes is maintained by the PrimePages, of which the largest 20 are listed below.

Rank	Number	Discovered	Digits	Form	Ref.
1	2^{136279841} − 1	2024-10-12	41,024,320	Mersenne	
2	2^{82589933} − 1	2018-12-07	24,862,048	Mersenne	
3	2^{77232917} − 1	2017-12-26	23,249,425	Mersenne	
4	2^{74207281} − 1	2016-01-07	22,338,618	Mersenne	
5	2^{57885161} − 1	2013-01-25	17,425,170	Mersenne	
6	2524190^{2097152} + 1	2025-10-12	13,426,224	Generalized Fermat	
7	2^{43112609} − 1	2008-08-23	12,978,189	Mersenne	
8	2^{42643801} − 1	2009-06-04	12,837,064	Mersenne	
9	516693^{2097152} − 516693^{1048576} + 1	2023-10-02	11,981,518	Generalized unique	
10	465859^{2097152} − 465859^{1048576} + 1	2023-05-31	11,887,192	Generalized unique	
11	2^{37156667} − 1	2008-09-06	11,185,272	Mersenne	
12	2^{32582657} − 1	2006-09-04	9,808,358	Mersenne	
13	10223 × 2^{31172165} + 1	2016-10-31	9,383,761	Proth	
14	2^{30402457} − 1	2005-12-15	9,152,052	Mersenne	
15	4 × 5^{11786358} + 1	2024-10-01	8,238,312	Generalized Proth	
16	2^{25964951} − 1	2005-02-18	7,816,230	Mersenne	
17	4052186 × 69^{4052186} + 1	2025-04-17	7,451,366	Generalized Cullen	
18	69 × 2^{24612729} − 1	2024-08-13	7,409,102	Riesel	
19	2^{24036583} − 1	2004-05-15	7,235,733	Mersenne	
20	7172162^{1048576} + 1	2026-08-12	7,188,671	Generalized Fermat	

== See also ==
- List of largest known primes and probable primes
- Integer factorization records
