= List of prime numbers =

This is a list of articles about prime numbers. A prime number (or prime) is a natural number greater than 1 that has no divisors other than 1 and itself. By Euclid's theorem, there is an infinite number of prime numbers. Subsets of the prime numbers may be generated with various formulas for primes.

The first 1,000 primes are listed below, followed by lists of notable types of prime numbers in alphabetical order, giving their respective first terms. The number 1 is neither prime nor composite.

== The first 1,000 prime numbers ==
The following table lists the first 1,000 primes, with 20 columns of consecutive primes in each of the 50 rows.

	1	2	3	4	5	6	7	8	9	10	11	12	13	14	15	16	17	18	19	20
1–20	2	3	5	7	11	13	17	19	23	29	31	37	41	43	47	53	59	61	67	71
21–40	73	79	83	89	97	101	103	107	109	113	127	131	137	139	149	151	157	163	167	173
41–60	179	181	191	193	197	199	211	223	227	229	233	239	241	251	257	263	269	271	277	281
61–80	283	293	307	311	313	317	331	337	347	349	353	359	367	373	379	383	389	397	401	409
81–100	419	421	431	433	439	443	449	457	461	463	467	479	487	491	499	503	509	521	523	541
101–120	547	557	563	569	571	577	587	593	599	601	607	613	617	619	631	641	643	647	653	659
121–140	661	673	677	683	691	701	709	719	727	733	739	743	751	757	761	769	773	787	797	809
141–160	811	821	823	827	829	839	853	857	859	863	877	881	883	887	907	911	919	929	937	941
161–180	947	953	967	971	977	983	991	997	1009	1013	1019	1021	1031	1033	1039	1049	1051	1061	1063	1069
181–200	1087	1091	1093	1097	1103	1109	1117	1123	1129	1151	1153	1163	1171	1181	1187	1193	1201	1213	1217	1223
201–220	1229	1231	1237	1249	1259	1277	1279	1283	1289	1291	1297	1301	1303	1307	1319	1321	1327	1361	1367	1373
221–240	1381	1399	1409	1423	1427	1429	1433	1439	1447	1451	1453	1459	1471	1481	1483	1487	1489	1493	1499	1511
241–260	1523	1531	1543	1549	1553	1559	1567	1571	1579	1583	1597	1601	1607	1609	1613	1619	1621	1627	1637	1657
261–280	1663	1667	1669	1693	1697	1699	1709	1721	1723	1733	1741	1747	1753	1759	1777	1783	1787	1789	1801	1811
281–300	1823	1831	1847	1861	1867	1871	1873	1877	1879	1889	1901	1907	1913	1931	1933	1949	1951	1973	1979	1987
301–320	1993	1997	1999	2003	2011	2017	2027	2029	2039	2053	2063	2069	2081	2083	2087	2089	2099	2111	2113	2129
321–340	2131	2137	2141	2143	2153	2161	2179	2203	2207	2213	2221	2237	2239	2243	2251	2267	2269	2273	2281	2287
341–360	2293	2297	2309	2311	2333	2339	2341	2347	2351	2357	2371	2377	2381	2383	2389	2393	2399	2411	2417	2423
361–380	2437	2441	2447	2459	2467	2473	2477	2503	2521	2531	2539	2543	2549	2551	2557	2579	2591	2593	2609	2617
381–400	2621	2633	2647	2657	2659	2663	2671	2677	2683	2687	2689	2693	2699	2707	2711	2713	2719	2729	2731	2741
401–420	2749	2753	2767	2777	2789	2791	2797	2801	2803	2819	2833	2837	2843	2851	2857	2861	2879	2887	2897	2903
421–440	2909	2917	2927	2939	2953	2957	2963	2969	2971	2999	3001	3011	3019	3023	3037	3041	3049	3061	3067	3079
441–460	3083	3089	3109	3119	3121	3137	3163	3167	3169	3181	3187	3191	3203	3209	3217	3221	3229	3251	3253	3257
461–480	3259	3271	3299	3301	3307	3313	3319	3323	3329	3331	3343	3347	3359	3361	3371	3373	3389	3391	3407	3413
481–500	3433	3449	3457	3461	3463	3467	3469	3491	3499	3511	3517	3527	3529	3533	3539	3541	3547	3557	3559	3571
501–520	3581	3583	3593	3607	3613	3617	3623	3631	3637	3643	3659	3671	3673	3677	3691	3697	3701	3709	3719	3727
521–540	3733	3739	3761	3767	3769	3779	3793	3797	3803	3821	3823	3833	3847	3851	3853	3863	3877	3881	3889	3907
541–560	3911	3917	3919	3923	3929	3931	3943	3947	3967	3989	4001	4003	4007	4013	4019	4021	4027	4049	4051	4057
561–580	4073	4079	4091	4093	4099	4111	4127	4129	4133	4139	4153	4157	4159	4177	4201	4211	4217	4219	4229	4231
581–600	4241	4243	4253	4259	4261	4271	4273	4283	4289	4297	4327	4337	4339	4349	4357	4363	4373	4391	4397	4409
601–620	4421	4423	4441	4447	4451	4457	4463	4481	4483	4493	4507	4513	4517	4519	4523	4547	4549	4561	4567	4583
621–640	4591	4597	4603	4621	4637	4639	4643	4649	4651	4657	4663	4673	4679	4691	4703	4721	4723	4729	4733	4751
641–660	4759	4783	4787	4789	4793	4799	4801	4813	4817	4831	4861	4871	4877	4889	4903	4909	4919	4931	4933	4937
661–680	4943	4951	4957	4967	4969	4973	4987	4993	4999	5003	5009	5011	5021	5023	5039	5051	5059	5077	5081	5087
681–700	5099	5101	5107	5113	5119	5147	5153	5167	5171	5179	5189	5197	5209	5227	5231	5233	5237	5261	5273	5279
701–720	5281	5297	5303	5309	5323	5333	5347	5351	5381	5387	5393	5399	5407	5413	5417	5419	5431	5437	5441	5443
721–740	5449	5471	5477	5479	5483	5501	5503	5507	5519	5521	5527	5531	5557	5563	5569	5573	5581	5591	5623	5639
741–760	5641	5647	5651	5653	5657	5659	5669	5683	5689	5693	5701	5711	5717	5737	5741	5743	5749	5779	5783	5791
761–780	5801	5807	5813	5821	5827	5839	5843	5849	5851	5857	5861	5867	5869	5879	5881	5897	5903	5923	5927	5939
781–800	5953	5981	5987	6007	6011	6029	6037	6043	6047	6053	6067	6073	6079	6089	6091	6101	6113	6121	6131	6133
801–820	6143	6151	6163	6173	6197	6199	6203	6211	6217	6221	6229	6247	6257	6263	6269	6271	6277	6287	6299	6301
821–840	6311	6317	6323	6329	6337	6343	6353	6359	6361	6367	6373	6379	6389	6397	6421	6427	6449	6451	6469	6473
841–860	6481	6491	6521	6529	6547	6551	6553	6563	6569	6571	6577	6581	6599	6607	6619	6637	6653	6659	6661	6673
861–880	6679	6689	6691	6701	6703	6709	6719	6733	6737	6761	6763	6779	6781	6791	6793	6803	6823	6827	6829	6833
881–900	6841	6857	6863	6869	6871	6883	6899	6907	6911	6917	6947	6949	6959	6961	6967	6971	6977	6983	6991	6997
901–920	7001	7013	7019	7027	7039	7043	7057	7069	7079	7103	7109	7121	7127	7129	7151	7159	7177	7187	7193	7207
921–940	7211	7213	7219	7229	7237	7243	7247	7253	7283	7297	7307	7309	7321	7331	7333	7349	7351	7369	7393	7411
941–960	7417	7433	7451	7457	7459	7477	7481	7487	7489	7499	7507	7517	7523	7529	7537	7541	7547	7549	7559	7561
961–980	7573	7577	7583	7589	7591	7603	7607	7621	7639	7643	7649	7669	7673	7681	7687	7691	7699	7703	7717	7723
981–1000	7727	7741	7753	7757	7759	7789	7793	7817	7823	7829	7841	7853	7867	7873	7877	7879	7883	7901	7907	7919

(sequence A000040 in the OEIS).

The Goldbach conjecture verification project reports that it has computed all primes smaller than 4×10^{18}. That means 95,676,260,903,887,607 primes (nearly 10^{17}), but they were not stored. There are known formulae to evaluate the prime-counting function (the number of primes smaller than a given value) faster than computing the primes. This has been used to compute that there are 1,925,320,391,606,803,968,923 primes (roughly 2×10^{21}) smaller than 10^{23}. A different computation found that there are 18,435,599,767,349,200,867,866 primes (roughly 2×10^{22}) smaller than 10^{24}, if the Riemann hypothesis is true.

== Lists of primes by type ==
Below are listed the first prime numbers of many named forms and types. More details are in the article for the name. n is a natural number (including 0) in the definitions.

=== Balanced primes ===
Balanced primes are primes with equal-sized prime gaps before and after them, making them the arithmetic mean of their next larger and next smaller prime.

- 5, 53, 157, 173, 211, 257, 263, 373, 563, 593, 607, 653, 733, 947, 977, 1103, 1123, 1187, 1223, 1367, 1511, 1747, 1753, 1907, 2287, 2417, 2677, 2903, 2963, 3307, 3313, 3637, 3733, 4013, 4409, 4457, 4597, 4657, 4691, 4993, 5107, 5113, 5303, 5387, 5393 (OEIS: A006562).

=== Bell primes ===
Bell primes are primes that are also the number of partitions of some finite set.

2, 5, 877, 27644437, 35742549198872617291353508656626642567, 359334085968622831041960188598043661065388726959079837. The next term has 6,539 digits. (OEIS: A051131)

=== Chen primes ===
Chen primes are primes p such that p+2 is either a prime or semiprime.

2, 3, 5, 7, 11, 13, 17, 19, 23, 29, 31, 37, 41, 47, 53, 59, 67, 71, 83, 89, 101, 107, 109, 113, 127, 131, 137, 139, 149, 157, 167, 179, 181, 191, 197, 199, 211, 227, 233, 239, 251, 257, 263, 269, 281, 293, 307, 311, 317, 337, 347, 353, 359, 379, 389, 401, 409 (OEIS: A109611)

=== Circular primes ===
A circular prime is a number that remains prime on any cyclic rotation of its base 10 digits.

2, 3, 5, 7, 11, 13, 17, 31, 37, 71, 73, 79, 97, 113, 131, 197, 199, 311, 337, 373, 719, 733, 919, 971, 991, 1193, 1931, 3119, 3779, 7793, 7937, 9311, 9377, 11939, 19391, 19937, 37199, 39119, 71993, 91193, 93719, 93911, 99371, 193939, 199933, 319993, 331999, 391939, 393919, 919393, 933199, 939193, 939391, 993319, 999331 (OEIS: A068652)

Some sources only include the smallest prime in each cycle. For example, listing 13, but omitting 31.

2, 3, 5, 7, 11, 13, 17, 37, 79, 113, 197, 199, 337, 1193, 3779, 11939, 19937, 193939, 199933, 1111111111111111111, 11111111111111111111111 (OEIS: A016114)

=== Cluster primes ===
A cluster prime is a prime p such that every even natural number k ≤ p − 3 is the difference of two primes not exceeding p.

3, 5, 7, 11, 13, 17, 19, 23, ... (OEIS: A038134)

All primes between 3 and 89, inclusive, are cluster primes. The first 10 primes that are not cluster primes are:

2, 97, 127, 149, 191, 211, 223, 227, 229, 251.

=== Cousin primes ===
Cousin primes are pairs of primes that differ by four.

(3, 7), (7, 11), (13, 17), (19, 23), (37, 41), (43, 47), (67, 71), (79, 83), (97, 101), (103, 107), (109, 113), (127, 131), (163, 167), (193, 197), (223, 227), (229, 233), (277, 281) (OEIS: A023200, OEIS: A046132)

=== Cuban primes ===
Cuban primes are primes $p$ of the form $p = k^3 - (k - 1)^3,$ where $k$ is a natural number.

7, 19, 37, 61, 127, 271, 331, 397, 547, 631, 919, 1657, 1801, 1951, 2269, 2437, 2791, 3169, 3571, 4219, 4447, 5167, 5419, 6211, 7057, 7351, 8269, 9241, 10267, 11719, 12097, 13267, 13669, 16651, 19441, 19927, 22447, 23497, 24571, 25117, 26227, 27361, 33391, 35317 (OEIS: A002407)

The term is also used to refer to primes $p$ of the form $p = (k^3 - (k - 2)^3)/2,$ where $k$ is a natural number.

13, 109, 193, 433, 769, 1201, 1453, 2029, 3469, 3889, 4801, 10093, 12289, 13873, 18253, 20173, 21169, 22189, 28813, 37633, 43201, 47629, 60493, 63949, 65713, 69313, 73009, 76801, 84673, 106033, 108301, 112909, 115249 (OEIS: A002648)

=== Cullen primes ===
Cullen primes are primes p of the form p=k2^{k} + 1, for some natural number k.

3, 393050634124102232869567034555427371542904833 (OEIS: A050920)

=== Delicate primes ===
Delicate primes are those primes that always become a composite number when any of their base 10 digits is changed.

294001, 505447, 584141, 604171, 971767, 1062599, 1282529, 1524181, 2017963, 2474431, 2690201, 3085553, 3326489, 4393139 (OEIS: A050249)

=== Dihedral primes ===
Dihedral primes are primes that satisfy 180° rotational symmetry and mirror symmetry on a seven-segment display.

2, 5, 11, 101, 181, 1181, 1811, 18181, 108881, 110881, 118081, 120121, 121021, 121151, 150151, 151051, 151121, 180181, 180811, 181081 (OEIS: A134996)

=== Real Eisenstein primes ===
Real Eisenstein primes are real Eisenstein integers that are irreducible. Equivalently, they are primes of the form 3k − 1, for a positive integer k.

2, 5, 11, 17, 23, 29, 41, 47, 53, 59, 71, 83, 89, 101, 107, 113, 131, 137, 149, 167, 173, 179, 191, 197, 227, 233, 239, 251, 257, 263, 269, 281, 293, 311, 317, 347, 353, 359, 383, 389, 401 (OEIS: A003627)

=== Emirps ===
Emirps are primes that become a different prime after their base 10 digits have been reversed. The name "emirp" is the reverse of the word "prime".

13, 17, 31, 37, 71, 73, 79, 97, 107, 113, 149, 157, 167, 179, 199, 311, 337, 347, 359, 389, 701, 709, 733, 739, 743, 751, 761, 769, 907, 937, 941, 953, 967, 971, 983, 991 (OEIS: A006567)

=== Euclid primes ===
Euclid primes are primes p such that p−1 is a primorial.

3, 7, 31, 211, 2311, 200560490131 (OEIS: A018239)

=== Euler irregular primes ===
Euler irregular primes are primes $p$ that divide an Euler number $E_{2n},$ for some $0\leq 2n\leq p-3.$

19, 31, 43, 47, 61, 67, 71, 79, 101, 137, 139, 149, 193, 223, 241, 251, 263, 277, 307, 311, 349, 353, 359, 373, 379, 419, 433, 461, 463, 491, 509, 541, 563, 571, 577, 587 (OEIS: A120337)

==== Euler (p, p − 3) irregular primes ====
Euler (p, p - 3) irregular primes are primes p that divide the (p + 3)rd Euler number.

149, 241, 2946901 (OEIS: A198245)

=== Factorial primes ===
Factorial primes are of the form n! ± 1.

2, 3, 5, 7, 23, 719, 5039, 39916801, 479001599, 87178291199, 10888869450418352160768000001, 265252859812191058636308479999999, 263130836933693530167218012159999999, 8683317618811886495518194401279999999 (OEIS: A088054)

=== Fermat primes ===
Fermat primes are primes p of the form p = 2^{2^{k}} + 1, for a non-negative integer k. As of June 2024 only five Fermat primes have been discovered.

3, 5, 17, 257, 65537 (OEIS: A019434)

==== Generalized Fermat primes ====
Generalized Fermat primes are primes p of the form p = a^{2^{k}} + 1, for a non-negative integer k and even natural number a.

$a$	Generalized Fermat primes with base a
2	3, 5, 17, 257, 65537, ... (OEIS: A019434)
4	5, 17, 257, 65537, ...
6	7, 37, 1297, ...
8	(none exist)
10	11, 101, ...
12	13, ...
14	197, ...
16	17, 257, 65537, ...
18	19, ...
20	401, 160001, ...
22	23, ...
24	577, 331777, ...

=== Fibonacci primes ===
Fibonacci primes are primes that appear in the Fibonacci sequence.

2, 3, 5, 13, 89, 233, 1597, 28657, 514229, 433494437, 2971215073, 99194853094755497, 1066340417491710595814572169, 19134702400093278081449423917 (OEIS: A005478)

=== Fortunate primes ===
Fortunate primes are primes that are also Fortunate numbers. There are no known composite Fortunate numbers.

3, 5, 7, 13, 17, 19, 23, 37, 47, 59, 61, 67, 71, 79, 89, 101, 103, 107, 109, 127, 151, 157, 163, 167, 191, 197, 199, 223, 229, 233, 239, 271, 277, 283, 293, 307, 311, 313, 331, 353, 373, 379, 383, 397 (OEIS: A046066)

=== Gaussian primes ===
Gaussian primes are primes p of the form p = 4k + 3, for a non-negative integer k.

3, 7, 11, 19, 23, 31, 43, 47, 59, 67, 71, 79, 83, 103, 107, 127, 131, 139, 151, 163, 167, 179, 191, 199, 211, 223, 227, 239, 251, 263, 271, 283, 307, 311, 331, 347, 359, 367, 379, 383, 419, 431, 439, 443, 463, 467, 479, 487, 491, 499, 503 (OEIS: A002145)

=== Good primes ===
Let the sequence of primes be indexed $p_1 = 2, p_2 = 3, p_3 = 5, \ldots$. Good primes are primes p_{n} satisfying p_{n−i} · p_{n+i} < p_{n}^{2} for all i < n.

5, 11, 17, 29, 37, 41, 53, 59, 67, 71, 97, 101, 127, 149, 179, 191, 223, 227, 251, 257, 269, 307 (OEIS: A028388)

=== Happy primes ===
Happy primes are primes that are also happy numbers.

7, 13, 19, 23, 31, 79, 97, 103, 109, 139, 167, 193, 239, 263, 293, 313, 331, 367, 379, 383, 397, 409, 487, 563, 617, 653, 673, 683, 709, 739, 761, 863, 881, 907, 937, 1009, 1033, 1039, 1039, 1093 (OEIS: A035497)

=== Harmonic primes ===
Harmonic primes are primes p for which there are no solutions to H_{k} ≡ 0 (mod p) and H_{k} ≡ −ω_{p} (mod p), for 1 ≤ k ≤ p−2, where H_{k} denotes the k-th harmonic number and ω_{p} denotes the Wolstenholme quotient.

5, 13, 17, 23, 41, 67, 73, 79, 107, 113, 139, 149, 157, 179, 191, 193, 223, 239, 241, 251, 263, 277, 281, 293, 307, 311, 317, 331, 337, 349 (OEIS: A092101)

=== Higgs primes ===
Higgs primes are primes p for which p − 1 divides the square of the product of all smaller Higgs primes.

2, 3, 5, 7, 11, 13, 19, 23, 29, 31, 37, 43, 47, 53, 59, 61, 67, 71, 79, 101, 107, 127, 131, 139, 149, 151, 157, 173, 181, 191, 197, 199, 211, 223, 229, 263, 269, 277, 283, 311, 317, 331, 347, 349 (OEIS: A007459)

=== Highly cototient primes ===
Highly cototient primes are primes that are a cototient more often than any integer below it except 1.

2, 23, 47, 59, 83, 89, 113, 167, 269, 389, 419, 509, 659, 839, 1049, 1259, 1889 (OEIS: A105440)

=== Home primes ===
For n ≥ 2, write the prime factorization of n in base 10 and concatenate the factors; iterate until a prime is reached.

For a non-negative integer, its home prime is obtained by concatenating its prime factors in increasing order repeatedly, until a prime is achieved.

2, 3, 211, 5, 23, 7, 3331113965338635107, 311, 773, 11, 223, 13, 13367, 1129, 31636373, 17, 233, 19, 3318308475676071413, 37, 211, 23, 331319, 773, 3251, 13367, 227, 29, 547, 31, 241271, 311, 31397, 1129, 71129, 37, 373, 313, 3314192745739, 41, 379, 43, 22815088913, 3411949, 223, 47, 6161791591356884791277 (OEIS: A037274)

=== Irregular primes ===
Irregular primes are odd primes p that divide the class number of the p-th cyclotomic field.

37, 59, 67, 101, 103, 131, 149, 157, 233, 257, 263, 271, 283, 293, 307, 311, 347, 353, 379, 389, 401, 409, 421, 433, 461, 463, 467, 491, 523, 541, 547, 557, 577, 587, 593, 607, 613 (OEIS: A000928)

==== (p, p − 3) irregular primes ====
The (p, p - 3) irregular primes are primes p such that (p, p − 3) is an irregular pair.

16843, 2124679 (OEIS: A088164)

==== (p, p − 5) irregular primes ====
The (p, p - 5) irregular primes are primes p such that (p, p − 5) is an irregular pair.

37

==== (p, p − 9) irregular primes ====
The (p, p - 9) irregular primes are primes p such that (p, p − 9) is an irregular pair.

67, 877 (OEIS: A212557)

=== Isolated primes ===
Isolated primes are primes p such that both p − 2 and p + 2 are both composite.

2, 23, 37, 47, 53, 67, 79, 83, 89, 97, 113, 127, 131, 157, 163, 167, 173, 211, 223, 233, 251, 257, 263, 277, 293, 307, 317, 331, 337, 353, 359, 367, 373, 379, 383, 389, 397, 401, 409, 439, 443, 449, 457, 467, 479, 487, 491, 499, 503, 509, 541, 547, 557, 563, 577, 587, 593, 607, 613, 631, 647, 653, 673, 677, 683, 691, 701, 709, 719, 727, 733, 739, 743, 751, 757, 761, 769, 773, 787, 797, 839, 853, 863, 877, 887, 907, 911, 919, 929, 937, 941, 947, 953, 967, 971, 977, 983, 991, 997 (OEIS: A007510)

=== Leyland primes ===
Leyland primes are primes p of the form p = a^{b} + b^{a}, where a and b are integers larger than one.

17, 593, 32993, 2097593, 8589935681, 59604644783353249, 523347633027360537213687137, 43143988327398957279342419750374600193 (OEIS: A094133)

=== Long primes ===
Long primes, or full reptend primes, are odd primes p for which $(10^{p-1}-1)/p$ is a cyclic number. Bases other than 10 are also used.

7, 17, 19, 23, 29, 47, 59, 61, 97, 109, 113, 131, 149, 167, 179, 181, 193, 223, 229, 233, 257, 263, 269, 313, 337, 367, 379, 383, 389, 419, 433, 461, 487, 491, 499, 503, 509, 541, 571, 577, 593 (OEIS: A001913)

=== Lucas primes ===
Lucas primes are primes that appear in the Lucas sequence.

2, 3, 7, 11, 29, 47, 199, 521, 2207, 3571, 9349, 3010349, 54018521, 370248451, 6643838879, 119218851371, 5600748293801, 688846502588399, 32361122672259149 (OEIS: A005479)

=== Lucky primes ===
Lucky primes are primes that are also lucky numbers.

3, 7, 13, 31, 37, 43, 67, 73, 79, 127, 151, 163, 193, 211, 223, 241, 283, 307, 331, 349, 367, 409, 421, 433, 463, 487, 541, 577, 601, 613, 619, 631, 643, 673, 727, 739, 769, 787, 823, 883, 937, 991, 997 (OEIS: A031157)

=== Mersenne primes ===
Mersenne primes are primes p of the form p = 2^{k} − 1, for some non-negative integer k.

3, 7, 31, 127, 8191, 131071, 524287, 2147483647, 2305843009213693951, 618970019642690137449562111, 162259276829213363391578010288127, 170141183460469231731687303715884105727 (OEIS: A000668)

As of 2024, there are 52 known Mersenne primes. The 13th, 14th, and 52nd have respectively 157, 183, and 41,024,320 digits. The largest known primes since 1992 have all been Mersenne primes, with the largest as of 2026 being 2^{136,279,841}−1, the 52nd Mersenne prime.

==== Mersenne divisors ====
Mersenne divisors are primes that divide 2^{k} − 1, for some prime k. Every Mersenne prime p is also a Mersenne divisor, with k = p.

3, 7, 23, 31, 47, 89, 127, 167, 223, 233, 263, 359, 383, 431, 439, 479, 503, 719, 839, 863, 887, 983, 1103, 1319, 1367, 1399, 1433, 1439, 1487, 1823, 1913, 2039, 2063, 2089, 2207, 2351, 2383, 2447, 2687, 2767, 2879, 2903, 2999, 3023, 3119, 3167, 3343 (OEIS: A122094)

==== Mersenne prime exponents ====
Primes p such that 2^{p} − 1 is prime.

2, 3, 5, 7, 13, 17, 19, 31, 61, 89, 107, 127, 521, 607, 1279, 2203, 2281, 3217, 4253, 4423, 9689, 9941, 11213, 19937, 21701, 23209, 44497, 86243, 110503, 132049, 216091, 756839, 859433, 1257787, 1398269, 2976221, 3021377, 6972593, 13466917, 20996011, 24036583, 25964951, 30402457, 32582657, 37156667, 42643801, 43112609, 57885161, 74207281, 77232917, 82589933 (OEIS: A000043)

As of September 2026, one more is known to be in the sequence, but it is not known whether it is the next:
136279841

==== Double Mersenne primes ====
A subset of Mersenne primes of the form 2^{2^{p}−1} − 1 for prime p.

7, 127, 2147483647, 170141183460469231731687303715884105727 (primes in OEIS: A077586)

==== Generalized repunit primes ====
Of the form (a^{n} − 1) / (a − 1) for fixed integer a.

For a = 2, these are the Mersenne primes, while for a = 10 they are the repunit primes. For other small a, they are given below:

a = 3: 13, 1093, 797161, 3754733257489862401973357979128773, 6957596529882152968992225251835887181478451547013 (OEIS: A076481)

a = 4: 5 (the only prime for a = 4)

a = 5: 31, 19531, 12207031, 305175781, 177635683940025046467781066894531, 14693679385278593849609206715278070972733319459651094018859396328480215743184089660644531 (OEIS: A086122)

a = 6: 7, 43, 55987, 7369130657357778596659, 3546245297457217493590449191748546458005595187661976371 (OEIS: A165210)

a = 7: 2801, 16148168401, 85053461164796801949539541639542805770666392330682673302530819774105141531698707146930307290253537320447270457

a = 8: 73 (the only prime for a = 8)

a = 9: none exist

==== Other generalizations and variations ====
Many generalizations of Mersenne primes have been defined. This include the following:

- Primes of the form b^{n} − (b − 1)^{n}, including the Mersenne primes and the cuban primes as special cases
- Williams primes, of the form (b − 1)·b^{n} − 1

=== Mills primes ===
Of the form ⌊θ^{3^{n}}⌋, where θ is Mills' constant. This form is prime for all positive integers n.

2, 11, 1361, 2521008887, 16022236204009818131831320183 (OEIS: A051254)

=== Minimal primes ===
Primes for which there is no shorter sub-sequence of the decimal digits that form a prime. There are exactly 26 minimal primes:

2, 3, 5, 7, 11, 19, 41, 61, 89, 409, 449, 499, 881, 991, 6469, 6949, 9001, 9049, 9649, 9949, 60649, 666649, 946669, 60000049, 66000049, 66600049 (OEIS: A071062)

=== Newman–Shanks–Williams primes ===
Newman–Shanks–Williams numbers that are prime.

7, 41, 239, 9369319, 63018038201, 489133282872437279, 19175002942688032928599 (OEIS: A088165)

=== Non-generous primes ===
Primes p for which the least positive primitive root is not a primitive root of p^{2}. Three such primes are known; it is not known whether there are more.

2, 40487, 6692367337 (OEIS: A055578)

=== Palindromic primes ===
Primes that remain the same when their decimal digits are read backwards.

2, 3, 5, 7, 11, 101, 131, 151, 181, 191, 313, 353, 373, 383, 727, 757, 787, 797, 919, 929, 10301, 10501, 10601, 11311, 11411, 12421, 12721, 12821, 13331, 13831, 13931, 14341, 14741 (OEIS: A002385)

=== Palindromic wing primes ===
Primes of the form $\frac{a \big( 10^m-1 \big)}{9} \pm b \times 10^{\frac{ m-1 }{2}}$ with $0 \le a \pm b < 10$. This means all digits except the middle digit are equal.

101, 131, 151, 181, 191, 313, 353, 373, 383, 727, 757, 787, 797, 919, 929, 11311, 11411, 33533, 77377, 77477, 77977, 1114111, 1117111, 3331333, 3337333, 7772777, 7774777, 7778777, 111181111, 111191111, 777767777, 77777677777, 99999199999 (OEIS: A077798)

=== Partition primes ===
Partition function values that are prime.

2, 3, 5, 7, 11, 101, 17977, 10619863, 6620830889, 80630964769, 228204732751, 1171432692373, 1398341745571, 10963707205259, 15285151248481, 10657331232548839, 790738119649411319, 18987964267331664557 (OEIS: A049575)

=== Pell primes ===
Primes in the Pell number sequence P_{0} = 0, P_{1} = 1, P_{n} = 2P_{n−1} + P_{n−2}.

2, 5, 29, 5741, 33461, 44560482149, 1746860020068409, 68480406462161287469, 13558774610046711780701, 4125636888562548868221559797461449 (OEIS: A086383)

=== Permutable primes ===
Any permutation of the decimal digits is a prime.

2, 3, 5, 7, 11, 13, 17, 31, 37, 71, 73, 79, 97, 113, 131, 199, 311, 337, 373, 733, 919, 991, 1111111111111111111, 11111111111111111111111 (OEIS: A003459)

=== Perrin primes ===
Primes in the Perrin number sequence P(0) = 3, P(1) = 0, P(2) = 2, P(n) = P(n−2) + P(n−3).

2, 3, 5, 7, 17, 29, 277, 367, 853, 14197, 43721, 1442968193, 792606555396977, 187278659180417234321, 66241160488780141071579864797 (OEIS: A074788)

=== Pierpont primes ===
Of the form 2^{u}3^{v} + 1 for some integers u,v ≥ 0.

These are also class 1- primes.

2, 3, 5, 7, 13, 17, 19, 37, 73, 97, 109, 163, 193, 257, 433, 487, 577, 769, 1153, 1297, 1459, 2593, 2917, 3457, 3889, 10369, 12289, 17497, 18433, 39367, 52489, 65537, 139969, 147457 (OEIS: A005109)

=== Pillai primes ===
Primes p for which there exist n > 0 such that p divides n! + 1 and n does not divide p − 1.

23, 29, 59, 61, 67, 71, 79, 83, 109, 137, 139, 149, 193, 227, 233, 239, 251, 257, 269, 271, 277, 293, 307, 311, 317, 359, 379, 383, 389, 397, 401, 419, 431, 449, 461, 463, 467, 479, 499 (OEIS: A063980)

=== Primes of the form n^{4} + 1 ===
Of the form n^{4} + 1.

2, 17, 257, 1297, 65537, 160001, 331777, 614657, 1336337, 4477457, 5308417, 8503057, 9834497, 29986577, 40960001, 45212177, 59969537, 65610001, 126247697, 193877777, 303595777, 384160001, 406586897, 562448657, 655360001 (OEIS: A037896)

=== Primeval primes ===
Primes for which there are more prime permutations of some or all the decimal digits than for any smaller number.

2, 13, 37, 107, 113, 137, 1013, 1237, 1367, 10079 (OEIS: A119535)

=== Primorial primes ===
Of the form p_{n}# ± 1.

3, 5, 7, 29, 31, 211, 2309, 2311, 30029, 200560490131, 304250263527209, 23768741896345550770650537601358309 (union of OEIS: A057705 and OEIS: A018239)

=== Proth primes ===
Of the form k×2^{n} + 1, with odd k and k < 2^{n}.

3, 5, 13, 17, 41, 97, 113, 193, 241, 257, 353, 449, 577, 641, 673, 769, 929, 1153, 1217, 1409, 1601, 2113, 2689, 2753, 3137, 3329, 3457, 4481, 4993, 6529, 7297, 7681, 7937, 9473, 9601, 9857 (OEIS: A080076)

=== Pythagorean primes ===
Of the form 4n + 1.

5, 13, 17, 29, 37, 41, 53, 61, 73, 89, 97, 101, 109, 113, 137, 149, 157, 173, 181, 193, 197, 229, 233, 241, 257, 269, 277, 281, 293, 313, 317, 337, 349, 353, 373, 389, 397, 401, 409, 421, 433, 449 (OEIS: A002144)

=== Prime quadruplets ===
Where (p, p+2, p+6, p+8) are all prime.

(5, 7, 11, 13), (11, 13, 17, 19), (101, 103, 107, 109), (191, 193, 197, 199), (821, 823, 827, 829), (1481, 1483, 1487, 1489), (1871, 1873, 1877, 1879), (2081, 2083, 2087, 2089), (3251, 3253, 3257, 3259), (3461, 3463, 3467, 3469), (5651, 5653, 5657, 5659), (9431, 9433, 9437, 9439) (OEIS: A007530, OEIS: A136720, OEIS: A136721, OEIS: A090258)

=== Quartan primes ===
Of the form x^{4} + y^{4}, where x,y > 0.

2, 17, 97, 257, 337, 641, 881 (OEIS: A002645)

=== Ramanujan primes ===
Integers R_{n} that are the smallest to give at least n primes from x/2 to x for all x ≥ R_{n} (all such integers are primes).

2, 11, 17, 29, 41, 47, 59, 67, 71, 97, 101, 107, 127, 149, 151, 167, 179, 181, 227, 229, 233, 239, 241, 263, 269, 281, 307, 311, 347, 349, 367, 373, 401, 409, 419, 431, 433, 439, 461, 487, 491 (OEIS: A104272)

=== Regular primes ===
Primes p that do not divide the class number of the p-th cyclotomic field.

3, 5, 7, 11, 13, 17, 19, 23, 29, 31, 41, 43, 47, 53, 61, 71, 73, 79, 83, 89, 97, 107, 109, 113, 127, 137, 139, 151, 163, 167, 173, 179, 181, 191, 193, 197, 199, 211, 223, 227, 229, 239, 241, 251, 269, 277, 281 (OEIS: A007703)

=== Repunit primes ===
Primes containing only the decimal digit 1.

11, 1111111111111111111 (19 digits), 11111111111111111111111 (23 digits) (OEIS: A004022)

The next have 317, 1031, 49081, 86453, 109297, and 270343 digits, respectively (OEIS: A004023).

=== Residue classes of primes ===
Of the form an + d for fixed integers a and d. Also called primes congruent to d modulo a.

The primes of the form 2n+1 are the odd primes, including all primes other than 2. Some sequences have alternate names: 4n+1 are the Pythagorean primes, 4n+3 are the integer Gaussian primes, and 6n+5 are the Eisenstein primes (with 2 omitted). The classes 10n+d (d = 1, 3, 7, 9) are primes ending in the decimal digit d.

If a and d are relatively prime, the arithmetic progression contains infinitely many primes.

2n+1: 3, 5, 7, 11, 13, 17, 19, 23, 29, 31, 37, 41, 43, 47, 53 (OEIS: A065091)
4n+1: 5, 13, 17, 29, 37, 41, 53, 61, 73, 89, 97, 101, 109, 113, 137 (OEIS: A002144)
4n+3: 3, 7, 11, 19, 23, 31, 43, 47, 59, 67, 71, 79, 83, 103, 107 (OEIS: A002145)
6n+1: 7, 13, 19, 31, 37, 43, 61, 67, 73, 79, 97, 103, 109, 127, 139 (OEIS: A002476)
6n+5: 5, 11, 17, 23, 29, 41, 47, 53, 59, 71, 83, 89, 101, 107, 113 (OEIS: A007528)
8n+1: 17, 41, 73, 89, 97, 113, 137, 193, 233, 241, 257, 281, 313, 337, 353 (OEIS: A007519)
8n+3: 3, 11, 19, 43, 59, 67, 83, 107, 131, 139, 163, 179, 211, 227, 251 (OEIS: A007520)
8n+5: 5, 13, 29, 37, 53, 61, 101, 109, 149, 157, 173, 181, 197, 229, 269 (OEIS: A007521)
8n+7: 7, 23, 31, 47, 71, 79, 103, 127, 151, 167, 191, 199, 223, 239, 263 (OEIS: A007522)
10n+1: 11, 31, 41, 61, 71, 101, 131, 151, 181, 191, 211, 241, 251, 271, 281 (OEIS: A030430)
10n+3: 3, 13, 23, 43, 53, 73, 83, 103, 113, 163, 173, 193, 223, 233, 263 (OEIS: A030431)
10n+7: 7, 17, 37, 47, 67, 97, 107, 127, 137, 157, 167, 197, 227, 257, 277 (OEIS: A030432)
10n+9: 19, 29, 59, 79, 89, 109, 139, 149, 179, 199, 229, 239, 269, 349, 359 (OEIS: A030433)
12n+1: 13, 37, 61, 73, 97, 109, 157, 181, 193, 229, 241, 277, 313, 337, 349 (OEIS: A068228)
12n+5: 5, 17, 29, 41, 53, 89, 101, 113, 137, 149, 173, 197, 233, 257, 269 (OEIS: A040117)
12n+7: 7, 19, 31, 43, 67, 79, 103, 127, 139, 151, 163, 199, 211, 223, 271 (OEIS: A068229)
12n+11: 11, 23, 47, 59, 71, 83, 107, 131, 167, 179, 191, 227, 239, 251, 263 (OEIS: A068231)

=== Safe primes ===
Where p and (p−1) / 2 are both prime.

5, 7, 11, 23, 47, 59, 83, 107, 167, 179, 227, 263, 347, 359, 383, 467, 479, 503, 563, 587, 719, 839, 863, 887, 983, 1019, 1187, 1283, 1307, 1319, 1367, 1439, 1487, 1523, 1619, 1823, 1907 (OEIS: A005385)

=== Self primes in base 10 ===
Primes that cannot be generated by any integer added to the sum of its decimal digits.

3, 5, 7, 31, 53, 97, 211, 233, 277, 367, 389, 457, 479, 547, 569, 613, 659, 727, 839, 883, 929, 1021, 1087, 1109, 1223, 1289, 1447, 1559, 1627, 1693, 1783, 1873 (OEIS: A006378)

=== Sexy primes ===
Where (p, p + 6) are both prime.

(5, 11), (7, 13), (11, 17), (13, 19), (17, 23), (23, 29), (31, 37), (37, 43), (41, 47), (47, 53), (53, 59), (61, 67), (67, 73), (73, 79), (83, 89), (97, 103), (101, 107), (103, 109), (107, 113), (131, 137), (151, 157), (157, 163), (167, 173), (173, 179), (191, 197), (193, 199) (OEIS: A023201, OEIS: A046117)

=== Smarandache–Wellin primes ===
Primes that are the concatenation of the first n primes written in decimal.

2, 23, 2357 (OEIS: A069151)

The fourth Smarandache-Wellin prime is the 355-digit concatenation of the first 128 primes that end with 719.

=== Solinas primes ===
Prime of the form $f(2^m)$, where $f(x)$ is a low-degree polynomial with small integer coefficients.

- 3, 5, 7, 11, 13 (OEIS: A165255; primes of the form $2^a\pm2^b\pm1$)
- 2^{32} − 5, the largest prime that fits into 32 bits of memory.
- 2^{64} − 59, the largest prime that fits into 64 bits of memory.

=== Sophie Germain primes ===
Where p and 2p + 1 are both prime. A Sophie Germain prime has a corresponding safe prime.

2, 3, 5, 11, 23, 29, 41, 53, 83, 89, 113, 131, 173, 179, 191, 233, 239, 251, 281, 293, 359, 419, 431, 443, 491, 509, 593, 641, 653, 659, 683, 719, 743, 761, 809, 911, 953 (OEIS: A005384)

=== Stern primes ===
Primes that are not the sum of a smaller prime and twice the square of a nonzero integer.

2, 3, 17, 137, 227, 977, 1187, 1493 (OEIS: A042978)

As of 2011, these are the only known Stern primes, and possibly the only existing.

=== Super-primes ===
Primes with prime-numbered indexes in the sequence of prime numbers (the 2nd, 3rd, 5th, ... prime).

3, 5, 11, 17, 31, 41, 59, 67, 83, 109, 127, 157, 179, 191, 211, 241, 277, 283, 331, 353, 367, 401, 431, 461, 509, 547, 563, 587, 599, 617, 709, 739, 773, 797, 859, 877, 919, 967, 991 (OEIS: A006450)

=== Supersingular primes ===
There are exactly fifteen supersingular primes:

2, 3, 5, 7, 11, 13, 17, 19, 23, 29, 31, 41, 47, 59, 71 (OEIS: A002267)

=== Thabit primes ===
Of the form 3×2^{n} − 1.

2, 5, 11, 23, 47, 191, 383, 6143, 786431, 51539607551, 824633720831, 26388279066623, 108086391056891903, 55340232221128654847, 226673591177742970257407 (OEIS: A007505)

The primes of the form 3×2^{n} + 1 are related.

7, 13, 97, 193, 769, 12289, 786433, 3221225473, 206158430209, 6597069766657 (OEIS: A039687)

=== Prime triplets ===
Where (p, p+2, p+6) or (p, p+4, p+6) are all prime.

(5, 7, 11), (7, 11, 13), (11, 13, 17), (13, 17, 19), (17, 19, 23), (37, 41, 43), (41, 43, 47), (67, 71, 73), (97, 101, 103), (101, 103, 107), (103, 107, 109), (107, 109, 113), (191, 193, 197), (193, 197, 199), (223, 227, 229), (227, 229, 233), (277, 281, 283), (307, 311, 313), (311, 313, 317), (347, 349, 353) (OEIS: A007529, OEIS: A098414, OEIS: A098415)

=== Truncatable prime ===
==== Left-truncatable ====
Primes that remain prime when the leading decimal digit is successively removed.

2, 3, 5, 7, 13, 17, 23, 37, 43, 47, 53, 67, 73, 83, 97, 113, 137, 167, 173, 197, 223, 283, 313, 317, 337, 347, 353, 367, 373, 383, 397, 443, 467, 523, 547, 613, 617, 643, 647, 653, 673, 683 (OEIS: A024785)

==== Right-truncatable ====
Primes that remain prime when the least significant decimal digit is successively removed.

2, 3, 5, 7, 23, 29, 31, 37, 53, 59, 71, 73, 79, 233, 239, 293, 311, 313, 317, 373, 379, 593, 599, 719, 733, 739, 797, 2333, 2339, 2393, 2399, 2939, 3119, 3137, 3733, 3739, 3793, 3797 (OEIS: A024770)

==== Two-sided ====
Primes that are both left-truncatable and right-truncatable. There are exactly fifteen two-sided primes:

2, 3, 5, 7, 23, 37, 53, 73, 313, 317, 373, 797, 3137, 3797, 739397 (OEIS: A020994)

=== Twin primes ===
Where (p, p+2) are both prime.

(3, 5), (5, 7), (11, 13), (17, 19), (29, 31), (41, 43), (59, 61), (71, 73), (101, 103), (107, 109), (137, 139), (149, 151), (179, 181), (191, 193), (197, 199), (227, 229), (239, 241), (269, 271), (281, 283), (311, 313), (347, 349), (419, 421), (431, 433), (461, 463) (OEIS: A001359, OEIS: A006512)

=== Unique primes ===
The list of primes p for which the period length of the decimal expansion of 1/p is unique (no other prime gives the same period).

3, 11, 37, 101, 9091, 9901, 333667, 909091, 99990001, 999999000001, 9999999900000001, 909090909090909091, 1111111111111111111, 11111111111111111111111, 900900900900990990990991 (OEIS: A040017)

=== Wagstaff primes ===
Of the form (2^{n} + 1) / 3.

3, 11, 43, 683, 2731, 43691, 174763, 2796203, 715827883, 2932031007403, 768614336404564651, 201487636602438195784363, 845100400152152934331135470251, 56713727820156410577229101238628035243 (OEIS: A000979)

Values of n:

3, 5, 7, 11, 13, 17, 19, 23, 31, 43, 61, 79, 101, 127, 167, 191, 199, 313, 347, 701, 1709, 2617, 3539, 5807, 10501, 10691, 11279, 12391, 14479, 42737, 83339, 95369, 117239, 127031, 138937, 141079, 267017, 269987, 374321 (OEIS: A000978)

=== Wall–Sun–Sun primes ===
A prime p > 5, if p^{2} divides the Fibonacci number $F_{p - \left(\frac{{p}}{{5}}\right)}$, where the Legendre symbol $\left(\frac{{p}}{{5}}\right)$ is defined as

$$\left(\frac{p}{5}\right) = \begin{cases} 1 &\textrm{if}\;p \equiv \pm1 \pmod 5\\ -1 &\textrm{if}\;p \equiv \pm2 \pmod 5. \end{cases}$$

As of 2022, no Wall-Sun-Sun primes have been found below $2^{64}$ (about $18\cdot 10^{18}$).

=== Wieferich primes ===
Primes p such that a^{p − 1} ≡ 1 (mod p^{2}) for fixed integer a > 1.

2^{p − 1} ≡ 1 (mod p^{2}): 1093, 3511 (OEIS: A001220)
3^{p − 1} ≡ 1 (mod p^{2}): 11, 1006003 (OEIS: A014127)
4^{p − 1} ≡ 1 (mod p^{2}): 1093, 3511
5^{p − 1} ≡ 1 (mod p^{2}): 2, 20771, 40487, 53471161, 1645333507, 6692367337, 188748146801 (OEIS: A123692)
6^{p − 1} ≡ 1 (mod p^{2}): 66161, 534851, 3152573 (OEIS: A212583)
7^{p − 1} ≡ 1 (mod p^{2}): 5, 491531 (OEIS: A123693)
8^{p − 1} ≡ 1 (mod p^{2}): 3, 1093, 3511
9^{p − 1} ≡ 1 (mod p^{2}): 2, 11, 1006003
10^{p − 1} ≡ 1 (mod p^{2}): 3, 487, 56598313 (OEIS: A045616)
11^{p − 1} ≡ 1 (mod p^{2}): 71
12^{p − 1} ≡ 1 (mod p^{2}): 2693, 123653 (OEIS: A111027)
13^{p − 1} ≡ 1 (mod p^{2}): 2, 863, 1747591 (OEIS: A128667)
14^{p − 1} ≡ 1 (mod p^{2}): 29, 353, 7596952219 (OEIS: A234810)
15^{p − 1} ≡ 1 (mod p^{2}): 29131, 119327070011 (OEIS: A242741)
16^{p − 1} ≡ 1 (mod p^{2}): 1093, 3511
17^{p − 1} ≡ 1 (mod p^{2}): 2, 3, 46021, 48947 (OEIS: A128668)
18^{p − 1} ≡ 1 (mod p^{2}): 5, 7, 37, 331, 33923, 1284043 (OEIS: A244260)
19^{p − 1} ≡ 1 (mod p^{2}): 3, 7, 13, 43, 137, 63061489 (OEIS: A090968)
20^{p − 1} ≡ 1 (mod p^{2}): 281, 46457, 9377747, 122959073 (OEIS: A242982)
21^{p − 1} ≡ 1 (mod p^{2}): 2
22^{p − 1} ≡ 1 (mod p^{2}): 13, 673, 1595813, 492366587, 9809862296159 (OEIS: A298951)
23^{p − 1} ≡ 1 (mod p^{2}): 13, 2481757, 13703077, 15546404183, 2549536629329 (OEIS: A128669)
24^{p − 1} ≡ 1 (mod p^{2}): 5, 25633
25^{p − 1} ≡ 1 (mod p^{2}): 2, 20771, 40487, 53471161, 1645333507, 6692367337, 188748146801

As of 2018, these are all known Wieferich primes with a ≤ 25.

=== Wilson primes ===
Primes p for which p^{2} divides (p−1)! + 1.

5, 13, 563 (OEIS: A007540)

As of 2018, these are the only known Wilson primes.

=== Wolstenholme primes ===
Primes p for which the binomial coefficient ${{2p-1}\choose{p-1}} \equiv 1 \pmod{p^4}.$

16843, 2124679 (OEIS: A088164)

As of 2018, these are the only known Wolstenholme primes.

=== Woodall primes ===
Of the form n×2^{n} − 1.

7, 23, 383, 32212254719, 2833419889721787128217599, 195845982777569926302400511, 4776913109852041418248056622882488319 (OEIS: A050918)

== See also ==
- Illegal prime – Number representing illegal information
- Largest known prime number
- List of largest known primes and probable primes
- List of numbers
- Prime gap – Difference between two successive prime numbers
- Prime number theorem – Characterization of how many integers are prime
- Probable prime – Integers that satisfy a specific condition
- Pseudoprime – Probable prime that is composite
- Strong prime – Type of prime number
- Table of prime factors
- Wieferich pair
