= Good prime =

Type of prime

A good prime is a prime number whose square is greater than the product of any two primes at the same number of positions before and after it in the sequence of primes.

That is, good prime satisfies the inequality

$$p_n^2 > p_{n-i} \cdot p_{n+i}$$

for all 1 ≤ i ≤ n−1, where p_{k} is the kth prime.

Example: the first primes are 2, 3, 5, 7 and 11. Since for 5 both the conditions

$$5^2 >3 \cdot 7$$
$$5^2 >2 \cdot 11$$

are fulfilled, 5 is a good prime.

There are infinitely many good primes. The first good primes are:

5, 11, 17, 29, 37, 41, 53, 59, 67, 71, 97, 101, 127, 149, 179, 191, 223, 227, 251, 257, 269, 307, 311, 331, 347, 419, 431, 541, 557, 563, 569, 587, 593, 599, 641, 727, 733, 739, 809, 821, 853, 929, 937, 967 (sequence A028388 in the OEIS).

An alternative version takes only i = 1 in the definition. With that there are more good primes:

5, 11, 17, 29, 37, 41, 53, 59, 67, 71, 79, 97, 101, 107, 127, 137, 149, 157, 163, 173, 179, 191, 197, 211, 223, 227, 239, 251, 257, 263, 269, 277, 281, 307, 311, 331, 347, 367, 373, 379, 397, 419, 431, 439, 457, 461, 479, 487, 499, 521, 541, 557, 563, 569, 587, 593, 599, 607, 613, 617, 631, 641, 653, 659, 673, 701, 719, 727, 733, 739, 751, 757, 769, 787, 809, 821, 827, 853, 857, 877, 881, 907, 929, 937, 947, 967, 977, 991 (sequence A046869 in the OEIS).
