= 384th Division =

384th Division may refer to:

- 384th Infantry Division, Wehrmacht, Germany
- 384th Rifle Division, Soviet Union

== See also ==
- List of military divisions by number
- 384th (disambiguation)
