= Pi prime =

Prime number containing consecutive digits of pi

Pi primes
- No. of known terms: 5 (+3 probable primes)
- First terms: 3, 31, 314159
- Largest known term: First 16208 digits of pi (probable: first 613373 digits of pi)
- OEIS index: A005042

In mathematics, a pi prime is a prime number appearing in the initial digits of the decimal expansion of the constant pi.

== Definition ==
Let $\pi_n$ be the integer formed by the first $n$ digits of pi. We call $\pi_n$ a pi prime when this value is a prime number. Below is a list of known and probable pi primes.

=== Known primes ===
- $\pi_1=3$
- $\pi_2=31$
- $\pi_6=314159$
- $\pi_{38}=31415926535897932384626433832795028841$
- $\pi_{16208}=3141592653...7943936307$

=== Probable primes ===
- $\pi_{47577}$
- $\pi_{78073}$
- $\pi_{613373}$

== History ==
In 1979, Robert Baillie and Marvin Wunderlich found that $\pi_{38}$ is prime.

In 2001, Ed T. Prothro found that the first 16208 digits of pi form a probable prime, and that after $\pi_{38}$, all such numbers with fewer than 16208 digits are composite numbers. In 2026, Robert Baillie proved that $\pi_{16208}$ was prime.

In 2006, Eric Weisstein showed that the next two possible pi primes have 47577 and 78073 digits. In 2016, A. Bondrescu showed that, after 78073, the next possible pi prime has 613373 digits. As of 2026, it has not been proven that any of these three numbers are primes.

A heuristic argument suggests that the sequence of pi primes is infinite.

== Extensions ==
An alternative definition considers only the decimal portion of pi, i.e. digits after the starting 3. In this definition we define $\pi_k$ to be the integer formed by the first $k$ digits of the decimal part of pi. Using this definition, $\pi_k$ is prime when $k = 5, 12, 281, 547$.

The notion of pi primes can be extended to other constants with infinite decimal expansions, for example, e and the golden ratio. Primes of this form are known as constant primes.

== See also ==
- Pi
- List of prime numbers
