= 383 (number) =

← 382	383	384 →
- List of numbers; Integers; ← 0 100 200 300 400 500 600 700 800 900 →
- Cardinal: three hundred eighty-three
- Ordinal: 383rd (three hundred eighty-third)
- Factorization: prime
- Divisors: 1, 383
- Greek numeral: ΤΠΓ´
- Roman numeral: CCCLXXXIII, ccclxxxiii
- Binary: 101111111_{2}
- Ternary: 112012_{3}
- Senary: 1435_{6}
- Octal: 577_{8}
- Duodecimal: 27B_{12}
- Hexadecimal: 17F_{16}

383 (three hundred [and] eighty-three) is the natural number following 382 and preceding 384.

== In mathematics ==
383 is the 76th prime number. As a prime, it is also a safe prime, a Woodall prime, a Thabit prime, a Fortunate prime, a Gaussian prime, an isolated prime, a long prime, a prime divisor of Mersenne numbers, a Pillai prime, a left-truncatable prime, an Eisenstein prime with no imaginary part, a palindromic prime, and a palindromic wing prime.

383 is a happy number since it eventually reaches 1 when the number is replaced by the sum of the square of each digit, but since 383 is prime, it is also a happy prime.

There are 383 Hamiltonian graphs with 9 nodes.
