= 16 (number) =

← 15	16	17 →
- ← 10 11 12 13 14 15 16 17 18 19 →: List of numbers; Integers; ← 0 10 20 30 40 50 60 70 80 90 →
- Cardinal: sixteen
- Ordinal: 16th (sixteenth)
- Numeral system: hexadecimal
- Factorization: 2^{4}
- Divisors: 1, 2, 4, 8, 16
- Greek numeral: ΙϚ´
- Roman numeral: XVI, xvi
- Binary: 10000_{2}
- Ternary: 121_{3}
- Senary: 24_{6}
- Octal: 20_{8}
- Duodecimal: 14_{12}
- Hexadecimal: 10_{16}
- Hebrew numeral: ט"ז / י"ו
- Babylonian numeral: 𒌋𒐚

16 (sixteen) is the natural number following 15 and preceding 17. It is the fourth power of two.

== Mathematics ==
16 is the ninth composite number, and a square number: 4^{2} = 4 × 4. It is the first fourth-power prime of the form p^{4}: 16 = 2^{4}. It is the smallest number with exactly five divisors: 1, 2, 4, 8, and 16.

Sixteen is the only integer that equals m^{n} and n^{m}, for some unequal integers m and n ($m=4$, $n=2$, or vice versa). It has this property because $2^{2}=2\times 2$. It is also equal to ^{3}2 (see tetration).

The aliquot sum of 16 is 15, within an aliquot sequence of four composite members (16, 15, 9, 4, 3, 1, 0) that belong to the prime 3-aliquot tree.

Sixteen is the largest known integer n, for which $2^n+1$ is prime.

There are sixteen partially ordered sets with four unlabeled elements.

Sixteen is the first Erdős–Woods number.

Sixteen is the only number that can be both the perimeter and area of the same square, due to $4^{2}$ being equal to $4\times 4.$

The sedenions form a 16-dimensional hypercomplex number system.

=== Hexadecimal ===
Sixteen is the base of the hexadecimal number system, which is used extensively in computer science.

== Technology ==
In some computer programming languages, the size in bits of certain data types, such as in 16-bit computing. In the 16-bit era, 16-bit microprocessor ran 16-bit applications.

A 16-bit integer can represent up to 65,536 values.

== Culture ==
=== As a unit of measurement ===
A low power of two, 16 was used in weighing light objects in several cultures. Early civilizations utilized the weighing scale as a means to measure mass, which made splitting resources into equal parts a simple task. In the imperial system, 16 ounces equivalates to one pound. Until the State Council of the People's Republic of China decreed a decimal conversion for currency in 1959, China equivalated 16 liǎng to one jīn. Chinese Taoists did finger computation on the trigrams and hexagrams by counting the finger tips and joints of the fingers with the tip of the thumb. Each hand can count up to 16 in such manner. The Chinese abacus uses two upper beads to represent the 5s and 5 lower beads to represent the 1s, the 7 beads can represent a hexadecimal digit from 0 to 15 in each column.

=== Age 16 ===
- A "sweet sixteen" is celebrated by many sixteen-year-old girls in the United States and Canada. It is a coming-of-age celebration that traditionally marks a girl's transition into womanhood.
- In the United States and Canada, 16 is the most common age of sexual consent, as well as the age in the United Kingdom and several European countries. Sixteen is also the minimum age for being allowed a beginner's driver's license with parental consent in many US states and in Canada.
