= 1093 (number) =

← 1092	1093	1094 →
- List of numbers; Integers; ← 0 1k 2k 3k 4k 5k 6k 7k 8k 9k →
- Cardinal: one thousand ninety-three
- Ordinal: 1093rd (one thousand ninety-third)
- Factorization: prime
- Divisors: 1, 1093
- Greek numeral: ,ΑϞΓ´
- Roman numeral: MXCIII, mxciii
- Binary: 10001000101_{2}
- Ternary: 1111111_{3}
- Senary: 5021_{6}
- Octal: 2105_{8}
- Duodecimal: 771_{12}
- Hexadecimal: 445_{16}

1093 (one thousand [and] ninety-three) is the natural number following 1092 and preceding 1094.

== In mathematics ==
1093 has only two divisors, meaning that it is the 183rd prime number. It is also a twin prime with 1097, a repdigit in ternary, the smallest 4-digit star prime, and a centered dodecagonal number. It is part of the Moser-de Bruijn sequence since it is the sum of distinct power of 4, and the Flavius Josephus's sieve.

1093 + 4, and (1093 + 1)/2 is prime.

=== Wieferich prime ===
1093 is most notable for being the first, and smallest out of only two known Wieferich primes, (Note: The two known Wieferich primes as of 2026 is 1093 and 3511.) since $1093^2$ divides $2^{\scriptstyle(1093 - 1)} - 1$, or such that $2^{\scriptstyle 1093 - 1} \equiv 1 \pmod{2}$, which is similar to the Fermat's little theorem. A Wieferich prime is named after Arthur Wieferich, although Wieferich himself found no example of a prime, but in the year 1913, W. Meissner discovered 1093 as a Wieferich prime. (Note: W. Meissner published a journal about this discovery in February 20, which is named "Über die Teilbarkeit von 2^{p−1} − 1 durch das Quadrat der Primzahl p = 1093".)

== In other fields ==
- The book Mathematics: From the Birth of Numbers by Jan Gullberg contains a titanic prime of 1093 pages.
- Thomas A. Edison held 1093 successful patent applications in the United States.
