= 3511 =

← 3510	3511	3512 →
- List of numbers; Integers; ← 0 1k 2k 3k 4k 5k 6k 7k 8k 9k →
- Cardinal: three thousand five hundred eleven
- Ordinal: 3511th (three thousand five hundred eleventh)
- Factorization: prime
- Prime: Yes
- Divisors: 1, 3511
- Greek numeral: ,ΓΦΙΑ´
- Roman numeral: MMMDXI, mmmdxi
- Binary: 110110110111_{2}
- Ternary: 11211001_{3}
- Senary: 24131_{6}
- Octal: 6667_{8}
- Duodecimal: 2047_{12}
- Hexadecimal: DB7_{16}

3511 (three thousand, five hundred and eleven) is the natural number following 3510 and preceding 3512.

== In mathematics ==
3511 is a prime number, and is also an emirp: a different prime when its digits are reversed.

3511 is a Wieferich prime, found to be so by N. G. W. H. Beeger in 1922 and the largest known – the only other being 1093. If any other Wieferich primes exist, they must be greater than 6.7×10^{15}.
