= 12 (number) =

← 11	12	13 →
- ← 10 11 12 13 14 15 16 17 18 19 →: List of numbers; Integers; ← 0 10 20 30 40 50 60 70 80 90 →
- Cardinal: twelve
- Ordinal: 12th (twelfth)
- Numeral system: duodecimal
- Factorization: 2^{2} × 3
- Divisors: 1, 2, 3, 4, 6, 12
- Greek numeral: ΙΒ´
- Roman numeral: XII, xii
- Greek prefix: dodeca-
- Latin prefix: duodeca-
- Binary: 1100_{2}
- Ternary: 110_{3}
- Senary: 20_{6}
- Octal: 14_{8}
- Duodecimal: 10_{12}
- Hexadecimal: C_{16}
- Malayalam: ൰൨
- Bengali: ১২
- Hebrew numeral: י"ב
- Babylonian numeral: 𒌋𒐖

12 (twelve) is the natural number following 11 and preceding 13.

Twelve is the 3rd superior highly composite number, the 3rd colossally abundant number, the 5th highly composite number, and is divisible by the numbers from 1 to 4, and 6, a comparatively large number of divisors.

It is central to many systems of timekeeping, including the Western calendar and units of time of day, and frequently appears in the world's major religions.

== Name ==
Twelve is the largest number with a single-syllable name in English. Early Germanic numbers have been theorized to have been non-decimal: evidence includes the unusual phrasing of eleven and twelve, the former use of "hundred" to refer to groups of 120, and the presence of glosses such as "tentywise" or "ten-count" in medieval texts showing that writers could not presume their readers would normally understand them that way. Such uses gradually disappeared with the introduction of Arabic numerals during the 12th-century Renaissance.

Derived from Old English, twelf and tuelf are first attested in the 10th-century Lindisfarne Gospels' Book of John. (Note: Specially, a passage referring to Judas Iscariot as "one of the twelve" (an of ðæm tuelfum).) It has cognates in every Germanic language (e.g. German zwölf), whose Proto-Germanic ancestor has been reconstructed as *twaliƀi..., from *twa ("two") and suffix *-lif- or *-liƀ- of uncertain meaning. It is sometimes compared with the Lithuanian dvýlika, although -lika is used as the suffix for all numbers from 11 to 19 (analogous to "-teen"). Every other Indo-European language instead uses a form of "two"+"ten", such as the Latin duōdecim. The usual ordinal form is "twelfth" but "dozenth" or "duodecimal" (from the Latin word) is also used in some contexts, particularly base-12 numeration. Similarly, a group of twelve things is usually a "dozen" but may also be referred to as a "dodecad" or "duodecad". The adjective referring to a group of twelve is "duodecuple".

As with eleven, the earliest forms of twelve are often considered to be connected with Proto-Germanic *liƀan or *liƀan ("to leave"), with the implicit meaning that "two is left" after having already counted to ten. The Lithuanian suffix is also considered to share a similar development. The suffix *-lif- has also been connected with reconstructions of the Proto-Germanic for ten.

As mentioned above, 12 has its own name in Germanic languages such as English (dozen), Dutch (dozijn), German (Dutzend), and Swedish (dussin), all derived from Old French dozaine. It is a compound number in many other languages, e.g. Italian dodici (but in Spanish and Portuguese, 16, and in French, 17 is the first compound number), Japanese 十二 jūni.

=== Written representation ===
In prose writing, twelve, being the last single-syllable numeral, is sometimes taken as the last number to be written as a word, and 13 the first to be written using digits. This is not a binding rule, and in English language tradition, it is sometimes recommended to spell out numbers up to and including either nine, ten or twelve, or even ninety-nine or one hundred. Another system spells out all numbers written in one or two words (sixteen, twenty-seven, fifteen thousand, but 372 or 15,001). In German orthography, there used to be the widely followed (but unofficial) rule of spelling out numbers up to twelve (zwölf). The Duden (the German standard dictionary) mentions this rule as outdated.

== In mathematics ==
=== Properties ===
12 is the smallest abundant number because the sum of the proper divisors of 12, 16, is greater than 12. It is also the 3rd colossally abundant number. 12 is a semiperfect number because some of its proper divisors; 1, 2, 3, and 6; sum to 12.

12 is a highly composite number because it has 6 divisors, more than any number less than 12. It is the 3rd superior highly composite number. 12 is a refactorable number because it has 6 divisors and 12 is a multiple of 6. It is the smallest of two known sublime numbers, numbers that have a perfect number of divisors whose sum is also perfect.

12 is a Pell number because 17/12 is the closest approximation of the square root of 2 of any fraction with a denominator less than or equal to 12.

There are twelve Jacobian elliptic functions and twelve cubic distance-transitive graphs.

=== Shapes ===
A twelve-sided polygon is a dodecagon. In its regular form, it is the largest polygon that can uniformly tile the plane alongside other regular polygons, as with the truncated hexagonal tiling or the truncated trihexagonal tiling.

A regular dodecahedron has twelve pentagonal faces. Regular cubes and octahedrons both have 12 edges, while regular icosahedrons have 12 vertices.

The cubic close packing and hexagonal close packing, which are the two densest possible sphere packings in three-dimensional space (the Kepler conjecture, proved by Thomas Hales), both have each sphere touching twelve other spheres. Twelve is also the kissing number in three dimensions.

There are twelve complex apeirotopes in dimensions five and higher, which include van Oss polytopes in the form of complex $n$-orthoplexes. There are also twelve paracompact hyperbolic Coxeter groups of uniform polytopes in five-dimensional space.

Bring's curve is a Riemann surface of genus four, with a domain that is a regular hyperbolic 20-sided icosagon. By the Gauss-Bonnet theorem, the area of this fundamental polygon is equal to $12\pi$.

=== Functions ===
Twelve is the smallest weight for which a cusp form exists. This cusp form is the discriminant $\Delta(q)$ whose Fourier coefficients are given by the Ramanujan $\tau$-function and which is (up to a constant multiplier) the 24th power of the Dedekind eta function:

$$\Delta(\tau)=(2\pi)^{12}\eta^{24}(\tau)$$

This fact is related to a constellation of interesting appearances of the number twelve in mathematics ranging from the fact that the abelianization of special linear group $\operatorname{SL}(2,\mathrm {Z})$ has twelve elements, to the value of the Riemann zeta function at $-1$ being $-\tfrac {1}{12}$, which stems from the Ramanujan summation

$$1 + 2 + 3 + 4 + \cdots=-\frac{1}{12} \quad (\mathfrak{R})$$

Although the series is divergent, methods such as Ramanujan summation can assign finite values to divergent series.

=== List of basic calculations ===
Multiplication	1	2	3	4	5	6	7	8	9	10	11	12	13	14	15	16	17	18	19	20	21	22	23	24	25	50	100	1000
12 × x	12	24	36	48	60	72	84	96	108	120	132	144	156	168	180	192	204	216	228	240	252	264	276	288	300	600	1200	12000

Division	1	2	3	4	5	6	7	8	9	10	11	12	13	14	15	16
12 ÷ x	12	6	4	3	2.4	2	1.7̅1̅4̅2̅8̅5̅	1.5	1.3̅	1.2	1.0̅9̅	1	0.9̅2̅3̅0̅7̅6̅	0.8̅5̅7̅1̅4̅2̅	0.8	0.75
x ÷ 12	0.083̅	0.16̅	0.25	0.3̅	0.416̅	0.5	0.583̅	0.6̅	0.75	0.83̅	0.916̅	1	1.083̅	1.16̅	1.25	1.3̅

Exponentiation	1	2	3	4	5	6	7	8	9	10	11	12
12^{x}	12	144	1728	20736	248832	2985984	35831808	429981696	5159780352	61917364224	743008370688	8916100448256
x^{12}	1	4096	531441	16777216	244140625	2176782336	13841287201	68719476736	282429536481	1000000000000	3138428376721	8916100448256

==== In other bases ====
The duodecimal system (12_{10} [twelve] = 10_{12}), which is the use of 12 as a division factor for many ancient and medieval weights and measures, including hours, probably originates from Mesopotamia.

== Religion ==
The number twelve carries religious, mythological and magical symbolism; since antiquity, the number has generally represented perfection, entirety, or cosmic order.

=== Judaism and Christianity ===
The number 12 is notable within the Hebrew Bible, and in Christianity:

Ishmael—the first-born son of Abraham—has 12 sons/princes (Genesis 25:16), and Jacob also has 12 sons, who are the progenitors of the Twelve Tribes of Israel. This is reflected in Christian tradition, notably in the twelve Apostles. When Judas Iscariot is disgraced, a meeting is held (Acts) to add Saint Matthias to complete the number twelve once more.

The Old Testament contains Twelve Minor Prophets.

The Book of Revelation contains much numerical symbolism, and many of the numbers mentioned have 12 as a divisor. 12:1 mentions a woman—interpreted as the people of Israel, the Church and the Virgin Mary—wearing a crown of twelve stars (representing each of the twelve tribes of Israel). Furthermore, there are 12,000 people sealed from each of the twelve tribes of Israel (the Tribe of Dan is omitted while Manasseh is mentioned), making a total of 144,000 (which is the square of 12 multiplied by a thousand).

- According to the New Testament, Jesus had twelve Apostles.
- The "Twelve Days of Christmas" count the interval between Christmas and Epiphany.
- Eastern Orthodoxy observes twelve Great Feasts.

=== Islam ===
- Twelve is mentioned a total of five times in four chapters (sura) of the Koran:
  - 12 springs twice, once in The Heifer (al-Baqarah) 2:60, and once in The Heights (al-A'raf) 7:160
  - 12 leaders in The Table Spread (al-Ma'idah) 5:12
  - 12 tribes of Israel in The Heights (al-A'raf) 7:160
  - 12 months in The Repentance (al-Tawbah) 9:36
- Twelve Imams are the spiritual and political successors to the Islamic prophet Muhammad in the Twelver branch of Shia Islam.
- The hadith of the twelve successors is a widely reported prophecy, attributed to Prophet Muhammad, predicting that there would be twelve successors after him.

=== Sikhism ===
There are considered to be 12 misls in the Sikh Conferacy.

=== Greek Mythology ===
There are 12 Olympian gods in the ancient Greek pantheon.

=== Astrology ===
- Western astrology assigns people to one of 12 signs of the tropical zodiac, based on their date of birth.
- Hindu astrology is based on the 12 rāśi ("parts") of the sidereal zodiac.

== Timekeeping ==
- The lunar year is 12 lunar months. Adding 11 or 12 days completes the solar year.
- Most calendar systems – solar or lunar – have twelve months in a year.
- The Chinese use a 12-year cycle for time-reckoning called Earthly Branches.
- There are twelve hours in a half day, numbered one to twelve for both the ante meridiem (a.m.) and the post meridiem (p.m.). 12:00 p.m. is midday or noon, and 12:00 a.m. is midnight.
- The basic units of time (60 seconds, 60 minutes, 24 hours) are evenly divisible by twelve into smaller units.

== In numeral systems ==
۱۲	Arabic	១២	Khmer	ԺԲ	Armenian
১২	Bangla	ΔΙΙ	Attic Greek	𝋬	Maya
יב	Hebrew	V20 Z1 Z1	Egyptian		
१२	Indian and Nepali (Devanāgarī)	十二	Chinese and Japanese		
௧௨	Tamil	XII	Roman and Etruscan		
๑๒	Thai	IIX	Chuvash		
౧౨	Telugu and Kannada	١٢	Urdu		
ιβʹ	Ionian Greek	൧൨	Malayalam		

== In science ==
- Force 12 on the Beaufort wind force scale corresponds to the maximum wind speed of a hurricane.

== In sports ==
- In both soccer and American football, the number 12 can be a symbolic reference to the fans because of the support they give to the 11 players on the field. Texas A&M University reserves the number 12 jersey for a walk-on player who represents the original "12th Man", a fan who was asked to play when the team's reserves were low in a college American football game in 1922. Similarly, Bayern Munich, Hammarby, Feyenoord, Atlético Mineiro, Flamengo, Seattle Seahawks, Portsmouth and Cork City do not allow field players to wear the number 12 on their jersey because it is reserved for their supporters.
- In rugby league, one of the starting second-row forwards wears the number 12 jersey in most competitions. An exception is in the Super League, which uses static squad numbering.
- In rugby union, one of the starting centres, most often but not always the inside centre, wears the 12 shirt.

== In technology ==
- ASCII and Unicode code point for form feed.

=== Music ===
==== Music theory ====
- Twelve is the number of pitch classes in an octave, not counting the duplicated (octave) pitch. Also, the total number of major keys, (not counting enharmonic equivalents) and the total number of minor keys (also not counting equivalents). This applies only to twelve tone equal temperament, the most common tuning used today in western influenced music.
- The twelfth is the interval of an octave and a fifth. Instruments such as the clarinet which behave as a stopped cylindrical pipe overblow at the twelfth.
- The twelve-tone technique (also dodecaphony) is a method of musical composition devised by Arnold Schoenberg. Music using the technique is called twelve-tone music.
- The twelve-bar blues is one of the most prominent chord progressions in popular music.

=== Art theory ===
- There are twelve basic hues in the color wheel: three primary colors (red, yellow, blue), three secondary colors (orange, green, purple) and six tertiary colors (names for these vary, but are intermediates between the primaries and secondaries).

== In other fields ==
12 stars are featured on the European Union flag.

- There are 12 troy ounces in a troy pound (used for precious metals).
- Twelve of something is called a dozen.
- In the former British currency system, there were twelve pence in a shilling.
- In English, twelve is the number of greatest magnitude that has just one syllable.
  The numerical range on the analog clock ends at 12.
- 12 is the last number featured on the analogue clock, and also the starting point of the transition from A.M. to P.M. hours or vice versa.
- There are twelve months within a year, with the last one being December.
- 12 inches are in a foot.
- 12 is slang for Police officers because of the 10-12 Police radio code.

== Sources ==
- Collins, Billie Jean (2002), "Necromancy, Fertility and the Dark Earth: The Use of Ritual Pits in Hittite Cult", in Mirecki, Paul; Meyer, Marvin (eds.), Magic and Ritual in the Ancient World, Leiden, The Netherlands: Brill, pp. 224–233, ISBN 90-04-10406-2
- Drews, Robert (January 1972). "Light from Anatolia on the Roman fasces". The American Journal of Philology. 93 (1): 40–51. doi:10.2307/292899. JSTOR 292899..
