= 384th =

384th may refer to:

- 384th Air Expeditionary Group, provisional United States Air Force unit assigned to the Air Combat Command
- 384th Air Expeditionary Wing, inactive unit of the United States Air Force
- 384th Air Refueling Squadron (384 ARS) is part of the 22d Air Refueling Wing at McConnell Air Force Base, Kansas
- 384th Bombardment Squadron or 134th Fighter Squadron, unit of the Vermont Air National Guard 158th Fighter Wing located at Burlington Air National Guard Base, Vermont
- 384th Fighter Squadron, inactive United States Air Force unit
- 384th Infantry Division (Wehrmacht) formed during the winter of 1941/42, as part of the 18th wave

== See also ==
- 384 (number)
- 384, the year 384 (CCCLXXXIV) of the Julian calendar
- 384 BC
