= 15 (number) =

← 14	15	16 →
- ← 10 11 12 13 14 15 16 17 18 19 →: List of numbers; Integers; ← 0 10 20 30 40 50 60 70 80 90 →
- Cardinal: fifteen
- Ordinal: 15th (fifteenth)
- Numeral system: pentadecimal
- Factorization: 3 × 5
- Divisors: 1, 3, 5, 15
- Greek numeral: ΙΕ´
- Roman numeral: XV, xv
- Binary: 1111_{2}
- Ternary: 120_{3}
- Senary: 23_{6}
- Octal: 17_{8}
- Duodecimal: 13_{12}
- Hexadecimal: F_{16}
- Hebrew numeral: ט"ו / י"ה
- Babylonian numeral: 𒌋𒐙

15 (fifteen) is the natural number following 14 and preceding 16.

== Mathematics ==
15 is the eighth composite number and the sixth semiprime and the first odd and fourth discrete semiprime. Its proper divisors are 1, 3, and 5, so it is the first semiprime of the form 3 × q, where q is a higher prime. 15 is a deficient number because the sum of the proper divisors of 15 is less than 15. The prime factors of 15, 3 and 5, form the first twin-prime pair.

Because 15 is the product of distinct Fermat primes, 3 and 5, a regular pentadecagon is constructible with a compass and unmarked straightedge, and $\cos \frac {\pi}{15}$ is expressible in terms of square roots.

The first 15 superabundant numbers are the same as the first 15 colossally abundant numbers. There are 15 supersingular primes. There are 15 truncatable primes that are both right-truncatable and left-truncatable:

2, 3, 5, 7, 23, 37, 53, 73, 313, 317, 373, 797, 3137, 3797, 739397 (sequence A020994 in the OEIS)

There are 15 partitions of a set of size 4, making 15 a Bell number

M = 15

15 is the magic constant of the unique order-3 normal magic square.

15 is the first number to be polygonal in 3 ways: it is the 5th triangular number, a hexagonal number, and pentadecagonal number. It is also a centered tetrahedral number.

15 is a lucky number.

15 as the difference of two positive squares (in orange).

15 is the smallest positive number that can be expressed as the difference of two positive squares in more than one way: $4^2-1^2$ or $8^2-7^2$ (see image).

In decimal, 15 contains the digits 1 and 5 and is the result of adding together the integers from 1 to 5 (1 + 2 + 3 + 4 + 5 = 15). The only other number with this property (in decimal) is 27.

The 15 perfect matchings of K_{6}

There are 15 perfect matchings of the complete graph K_{6} and 15 rooted binary trees with four labeled leaves, both of these being among the types of objects counted by double factorials.

If a positive definite quadratic form with integer matrix represents all positive integers up to 15, then it represents all positive integers via the 15 and 290 theorems.

There are 15 monohedral convex pentagonal tilings, with eight being edge-to-edge. There are 15 regular and semiregular tilings when infinite (improper) apeirogonal forms are counted: three are regular (with one self-dual), eight are semiregular (with one chiral), and four are apeirogonal (from a total of 8, in-which 4 are duplicates).

Full icosahedral symmetry contains 15 mirror planes (2-fold axes). Specifically, the symmetry order for both the regular icosahedron and regular dodecahedron (which is made of regular pentagons) is 120: equal to sum of the first 15 integers, and the factorial of 5, wherein the sum of the first 5 integers itself is 15. Expressed mathematically:

$\sum_{i=1}^{15}i = 120$, while $\sum_{i=1}^{5}i = 15$, and $5! = 120$.

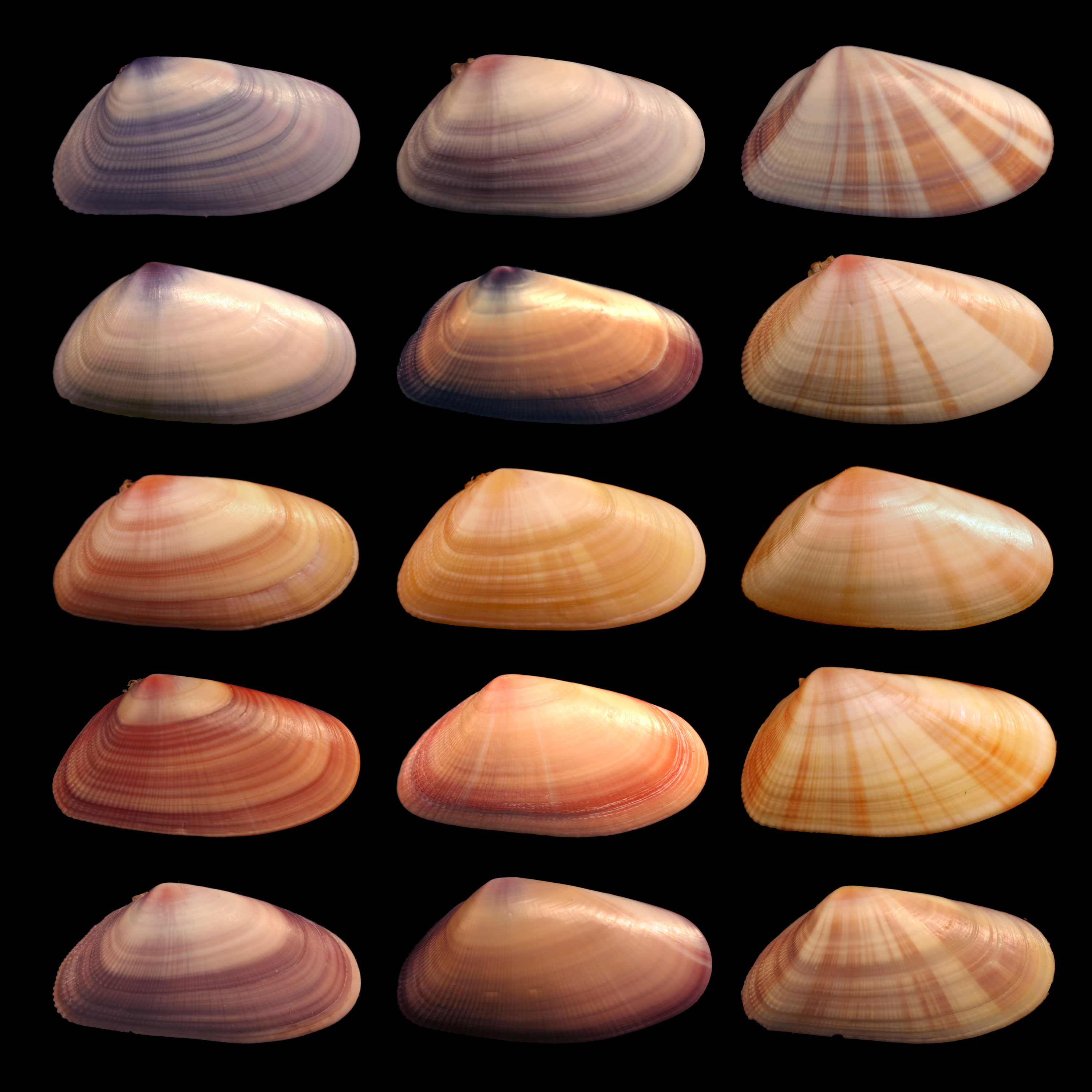
Seashells from the mollusk Donax variabilis have 15 coloring pattern phenotypes.

== Religion ==
=== Sunnism ===
The Hanbali Sunni madhab states that the age of fifteen of a solar or lunar calendar is when one's taklif (obligation or responsibility) begins and is the stage whereby one has his deeds recorded.

=== Judaism ===
In the Hebrew numbering system, the number 15 is not written according to the usual method, with the letters that represent "10" and "5" (י-ה, yodh and heh), because those spell out one of the Jewish names of God. Instead, the date is written with the letters representing "9" and "6" (ט-ו, teth and vav).
