= Sublime number =

Number that has a perfect number of factors adding up to another perfect number

In number theory, a sublime number is a positive integer which has a perfect number of positive factors (including itself), and whose positive factors add up to another perfect number.

The number 12, for example, is a sublime number. It has a perfect number of positive factors (6): 1, 2, 3, 4, 6, and 12, and the sum of these is again a perfect number: 1 + 2 + 3 + 4 + 6 + 12 = 28.

As of July 2026, there are only two known sublime numbers: 12 and (2^{126})(2^{61} − 1)(2^{31} − 1)(2^{19} − 1)(2^{7} − 1)(2^{5} − 1)(2^{3} − 1) (sequence A081357 in the OEIS). The second of these has 76 decimal digits:

6,086,555,670,238,378,989,670,371,734,243,169,622,657,830,773,351,885,970,528,324,860,512,791,691,264.

It has 8128 positive divisors, which all add up to 2^{126}(2^{127}-1), the 12th even perfect number (by the Euclid–Euler theorem, since 2^{127}-1 is the 12th Mersenne prime).
