= 18 (number) =

← 17	18	19 →
- ← 10 11 12 13 14 15 16 17 18 19 →: List of numbers; Integers; ← 0 10 20 30 40 50 60 70 80 90 →
- Cardinal: eighteen
- Ordinal: 18th (eighteenth)
- Numeral system: octodecimal
- Factorization: 2 × 3^{2}
- Divisors: 1, 2, 3, 6, 9, 18
- Greek numeral: ΙΗ´
- Roman numeral: XVIII, xviii
- Unicode symbol: 0031 0038
- Binary: 10010_{2}
- Ternary: 200_{3}
- Senary: 30_{6}
- Octal: 22_{8}
- Duodecimal: 16_{12}
- Hexadecimal: 12_{16}
- Hebrew numeral: י"ח
- Babylonian numeral: 𒌋𒐜

18 (eighteen) is the natural number following 17 and preceding 19.

== Mathematics ==
18 is a semiperfect number and an abundant number. In the classification of finite simple groups, there are 18 infinite families of groups.

Although 18 and σ(18) = 39 are not coprime, 18 is known to be a solitary number. 18 is the smallest number known to have this property; for 10, 14, and 15, their status as friendly or solitary is not known.

== In science ==
=== Chemistry ===
The 18-electron rule is a rule of thumb in transition metal chemistry for characterising and predicting the stability of metal complexes.

== In religion and literature ==
=== Judaism ===
- The Hebrew word for "life" is חי (chai), which has a numerical value of 18. Consequently, a custom has arisen in Jewish circles to give donations and monetary gifts in multiples of 18 as an expression of blessing for long life.
- In Judaism, in the Talmud; Pirkei Avot (5:25), Rabbi Yehudah ben Teime gives the age of 18 as the appropriate age to get married ("Ben shmonah esra lechupah", at eighteen years old to the Chupah (marriage canopy)). (See Coming of age, Age of majority).
- The Amidah prayer is also known Shemoneh Esrei as (sh'MOH-nuh ES-ray, which means "eighteen") because it has eighteen blessings.

=== Other ===
- In Ancient Roman custom the number 18 can symbolise a blood relative.
- In Hinduism, in the Mahabharata, the number appears in 18 books (Parvas), the 18 chapters of the Bhagavad Gita, the 18 days of the Kurukshetra War, and the 18 Akshauhini divisions of armies. There are also 18 major and 18 minor Puranas.

== As lucky or unlucky number ==
- In Chinese tradition, 18 is pronounced 十八; shí bā and is considered a lucky number due to similarity with 實發; shì fā 'definitely get rich', 'to get rich for sure'.

== Age 18 ==
In most countries, 18 is the age of majority, in which a minor becomes a legal adult. It is also the voting age, marriageable age, drinking age and smoking age in most countries, though sometimes these ages are different than the age of majority. Many websites restrict adult content to visitors who claim to be at least 18 years old.

- In the United States, 18 is the:
  - Age for sexual consent in eleven states and under federal law.
  - Minimum age to purchase firearms in thirty-eight states with the exception of handguns (21 under federal law).
  - Marriageable age without parental consent except for Nebraska (19), Mississippi, (19) and Puerto Rico (21).
  - The minimum age at which one can purchase, rent, or buy tickets to NC-17-rated films or buy video games with an Adults Only rating.
- In the UK, 18 is the legal age to purchase a BBFC "18" rated film.
- In Japan, 18 is the minimum age at which one can purchase, rent, or buy tickets to R18+ rated movies or buy video games with a Z rating, although 20 is their cultural age of adulthood.

== In sports ==
- In association football (soccer), "the 18" is a slang term for the penalty area.
