= Irregularity of distributions =

Mathematical problem

The irregularity of distributions problem, stated first by Hugo Steinhaus, is a numerical problem with a surprising result. The problem is to find N numbers, $x_1,\ldots,x_N$, all between 0 and 1, for which the following conditions hold:

- The first two numbers must be in different halves (one less than 1/2, one greater than 1/2).
- The first 3 numbers must be in different thirds (one less than 1/3, one between 1/3 and 2/3, one greater than 2/3).
- The first 4 numbers must be in different fourths.
- The first 5 numbers must be in different fifths.
- etc.

Mathematically, we are looking for a sequence of real numbers

$$x_1,\ldots,x_N$$

such that for every n ∈ {1, ..., N} and every k ∈ {1, ..., n} there is some i ∈ {1, ..., k} such that

$$\frac{k-1}{n} \leq x_i < \frac{k}{n}.$$

== Solution ==
The surprising result is that there is a solution up to N = 17, but starting at N = 18 and above it is impossible. A possible solution for N ≤ 17 is shown diagrammatically on the right; numerically it is as follows:

A possible solution for N = 17 shown diagrammatically. In each row n, there are n “vines” which are all in different n^{th}s. For example, looking at row 5, it can be seen that 0 < x_{1} < 1/5 < x_{5} < 2/5 < x_{3} < 3/5 < x_{4} < 4/5 < x_{2} < 1. The numerical values are printed in the article text.

$$\begin{align}
x_{1} & = 0.029 \\
x_{2} & = 0.971 \\
x_{3} & = 0.423 \\
x_{4} & = 0.71 \\
x_{5} & = 0.27 \\
x_{6} & = 0.542 \\
x_{7} & = 0.852 \\
x_{8} & = 0.172 \\
x_{9} & = 0.62 \\
x_{10} & = 0.355 \\
x_{11} & = 0.777 \\
x_{12} & = 0.1 \\
x_{13} & = 0.485 \\
x_{14} & = 0.905 \\
x_{15} & = 0.218 \\
x_{16} & = 0.667 \\
x_{17} & = 0.324
\end{align}$$

In this example, considering for instance the first 5 numbers, we have

$$0 < x_1 < \frac{1}{5} < x_5 < \frac{2}{5} < x_3 < \frac{3}{5} < x_4 < \frac{4}{5} < x_2 < 1.$$

Mieczysław Warmus concluded that 768 (1536, counting symmetric solutions separately) distinct sets of intervals satisfy the conditions for N = 17.
