= 384 (number) =

← 383	384	385 →
- List of numbers; Integers; ← 0 100 200 300 400 500 600 700 800 900 →
- Cardinal: three hundred eighty-four
- Ordinal: 384th (three hundred eighty-fourth)
- Factorization: 2^{7} × 3
- Greek numeral: ΤΠΔ´
- Roman numeral: CCCLXXXIV, ccclxxxiv
- Binary: 110000000_{2}
- Ternary: 112020_{3}
- Senary: 1440_{6}
- Octal: 600_{8}
- Duodecimal: 280_{12}
- Hexadecimal: 180_{16}

384 (three hundred [and] eighty-four) is the natural number following 383 and preceding 385.

== In mathematics ==
384 is:

- the sum of a twin prime pair (191 + 193).
- the sum of six consecutive primes (53 + 59 + 61 + 67 + 71 + 73).
- the order of the hyperoctahedral group for n = 4
- the double factorial of 8.
- the 4-factorial of 12 ($12!_{(4)}=384$).
- an abundant number.
- the third 129-gonal number after 1, 129 and before 766 and 1275.
- a Harshad number in bases 2, 3, 4, 5, 7, 8, 9, 13, 17, and 62 other bases.
- a refactorable number.
- a Granville number.
- a regular number.

== Computing ==
Being a low multiple of a power of two (3 x 128), 384 occurs often in the field of computing. For example, the secure hash function SHA-384 has a 384-bit digest, the screen resolution of the Virtual Boy is 384x224, MP3 Audio layer 1 encoding is 384 kbps, and in 3G phones the WAN implementation of CDMA is up to 384 kbps.
