= 353 (number) =

← 352	353	354 →
- List of numbers; Integers; ← 0 100 200 300 400 500 600 700 800 900 →
- Cardinal: three hundred fifty-three
- Ordinal: 353rd (three hundred fifty-third)
- Factorization: prime
- Prime: 71st
- Greek numeral: ΤΝΓ´
- Roman numeral: CCCLIII, cccliii
- Binary: 101100001_{2}
- Ternary: 111002_{3}
- Senary: 1345_{6}
- Octal: 541_{8}
- Duodecimal: 255_{12}
- Hexadecimal: 161_{16}

353 (three hundred [and] fifty-three) is the natural number following 352 and preceding 354.

== In mathematics ==
353 is the 71st prime number, a palindromic prime, an irregular prime, a super-prime, a Chen prime, a Proth prime, and an Eisenstein prime.

In connection with Euler's sum of powers conjecture, 353 is the smallest number whose 4th power is equal to the sum of four other 4th powers, as discovered by R. Norrie in 1911:

$$353^4=30^4+120^4+272^4+315^4.$$

In a seven-team round robin tournament, there are 353 combinatorially distinct outcomes in which no subset of teams wins all its games against the teams outside the subset; mathematically, there are 353 strongly connected tournaments on seven nodes.

353 is one of the solutions to the stamp folding problem: there are exactly 353 ways to fold a strip of eight blank stamps into a single flat pile of stamps.

353 is a zero of Mertens Function.

353 is an index of a prime Lucas number.

The absolute difference between the sum of composites and the sum of primes up to $p_n$ is given by:

$$a(n) = \left| \sum_{k=1}^{c(p_n)} C_k - \sum_{i=1}^n p_i \right|$$

For $n = 71$ ($p_{71} = 353$):

$$\left| 51240 - 11240 \right| = 40000$$
