= Balanced prime =

Type of prime number

In number theory, a balanced prime is a prime number with equal-sized prime gaps above and below it, so that it is equal to the arithmetic mean of the nearest primes above and below. Algebraically, the $n$th prime number $p_n$ is a balanced prime if

$$p_n = {{p_{n - 1} + p_{n + 1}} \over 2}.$$

For example, 53 is the sixteenth prime; the fifteenth and seventeenth primes, 47 and 59, add up to 106, and half of that is 53; thus 53 is a balanced prime.

== Examples ==
The first few balanced primes are

5, 53, 157, 173, 211, 257, 263, 373, 563, 593, 607, 653, 733, 947, 977, 1103, 1123, 1187, 1223, 1367, 1511, 1747, 1753, 1907, 2287, 2417, 2677, 2903 (sequence A006562 in the OEIS).

With the exception of $5=\frac{3+7}{2}$, no element of a twin prime pair is a balanced prime. This follows from the fact that there are no twin prime triplets of the form $(p-2,p,p+2)$ other than $(3,5,7)$. This intermediate statement itself follows from the fact that a twin prime triplet gives all possible different remainders on division by 3, and therefore one element must be divisible by 3. For $p>5$, this contradicts the fact that no prime other than 3 is divisible by 3. Furthermore, a twin prime cannot be balanced except by being part of a twin prime triple because there is no possible closer prime than a twin prime for $p>3$ (for $p=3$, $p-1=2$ is prime), so $(p-2,p,p+n)$ and $(p-n,p,p+2)$ are not balanced for $n>2$ and not a twin prime triple for $n=2$ and $p>5$. Therefore, $5$ is the only balanced prime that is also an element of a twin prime pair.

In general, there are no balanced primes $p_n>5$ for a given balanced prime gap $g=p_n-p_{n-1}=p_{n+1}-p_n$ of the form $g\in \{2,4\} \pmod{6}$. This follows from a similar line of reasoning to that above: given $g$ of the form $g\in \{2,4\} \pmod{6}$, the triple $(p-g,p,p+g)$ contains all remainders on division by 3 and therefore any such balanced triple for which $p-g>3$ is not all primes. But if $p-g=3$, then the next-greatest prime is $5$, so the only balanced prime triple containing $3$ given the requirement of consecutiveness is $(3,5,7)$. As such, no other balanced primes exist with $g\in \{2,4\} \pmod{6}$, and therefore (apart from $2$ for $p=5$) the only balanced prime gaps $g$ are those of the form $g\equiv 0 \pmod{6}$ or $g=6k$ for $k\in\Z^+$.

== Infinitude ==
Unsolved problem in mathematics
Are there infinitely many balanced primes?
More unsolved problems in mathematics

It is conjectured that there are infinitely many balanced primes.

Three consecutive primes in arithmetic progression is sometimes called a CPAP-3. A balanced prime is by definition the second prime in a CPAP-3. As of 2023 the largest known CPAP-3 has 15004 decimal digits and was found by Serge Batalov. It is:

$$p_n = 2494779036241 \times 2^{49800} + 7,\quad  p_{n-1} = p_n-6,\quad  p_{n+1} = p_n+6.$$

(The value of $n$, i.e. its position in the sequence of all primes, may never be known in full. Though, given that $n = \pi(p_n) \approx \frac{p_n}{log(p_n)}$, where $\pi(p)$ is the prime counting function, we would expect $n$ to be in the region of $1.42 \times 10^{14999}$)

== Generalization ==
The balanced primes may be generalized to the balanced primes of order n. A balanced prime of order n is a prime number that is equal to the arithmetic mean of the nearest n primes above and below. Algebraically, the $k$th prime number $p_k$ is a balanced prime of order $n$ if

$$p_k = { \sum_{i=1}^n ({p_{k - i} + p_{k + i})} \over 2n}.$$

Thus, an ordinary balanced prime is a balanced prime of order 1. The sequences of balanced primes of orders 2, 3, and 4 are A082077, A082078, and A082079 in the OEIS respectively.

== See also ==
- Strong prime, a prime that is greater than the arithmetic mean of its two neighboring primes
- Interprime, a composite number balanced between two prime neighbours
