= 6000 (number) =

← 5999	6000	6001 →
- List of numbers; Integers; ← 0 1k 2k 3k 4k 5k 6k 7k 8k 9k →
- Cardinal: six thousand
- Ordinal: 6000th (six thousandth)
- Factorization: 2^{4} × 3 × 5^{3}
- Greek numeral: ,Ϛ´
- Roman numeral: V̅M, or V̅I̅
- Unicode symbol(s): V̅M, v̅m, V̅I̅, v̅i̅
- Binary: 1011101110000_{2}
- Ternary: 22020020_{3}
- Senary: 43440_{6}
- Octal: 13560_{8}
- Duodecimal: 3580_{12}
- Hexadecimal: 1770_{16}
- Armenian: Ց

6000 (six thousand) is the natural number following 5999 preceding 6001.

== Selected numbers in the range 6001–6999 ==
=== 6001 to 6099 ===
- 6028 – centered heptagonal number
- 6037 – super-prime
- 6047 – safe prime
- 6053 – Sophie Germain prime
- 6064 – 6064/4813 ≈ ∛2
- 6069 – nonagonal number
- 6073 – balanced prime
- 6084 = 78^{2}, sum of the cubes of the first twelve integers
- 6081 – sum of the first 54 primes
- 6089 – highly cototient number
- 6095 – magic constant of n × n normal magic square and n-Queens Problem for n = 23.

=== 6100 to 6199 ===
- 6101 – Sophie Germain prime
- 6105 – triangular number
- 6113 – Sophie Germain prime, super-prime
- 6131 – Sophie Germain prime, twin prime with 6133
- 6133 – 800th prime number, twin prime with 6131
- 6143 – Thabit number
- 6173 – Sophie Germain prime
- 6174 – Kaprekar's constant
- 6181 – octahedral number

=== 6200 to 6299 ===
- 6200 – harmonic divisor number
- 6201 – square pyramidal number
- 6216 – triangular number
- 6217 – super-prime
- 6229 – super-prime
- 6232 – amicable number with 6368
- 6241 = 79^{2}, centered octagonal number
- 6250 – Leyland number
- 6263 – Sophie Germain prime, balanced prime
- 6269 – Sophie Germain prime
- 6280 – decagonal number

=== 6300 to 6399 ===
- 6311 – super-prime
- 6317 – balanced prime
- 6322 – centered heptagonal number
- 6323 – Sophie Germain prime, balanced prime, super-prime
- 6328 – triangular number
- 6329 – Sophie Germain prime
- 6337 – star prime
- 6338 – sum of the first 55 primes
- 6346 – number of verses in the Qur'an according to the sect founded by Rashad Khalifa.
- 6361 – twin prime
- 6364 – nonagonal number
- 6367 – balanced prime
- 6368 – amicable number with 6232
- 6373 – balanced prime, sum of three and seven consecutive primes (2113 + 2129 + 2131 and 883 + 887 + 907 + 911 + 919 + 929 + 937)
- 6399 – smallest integer that cannot be expressed as a sum of fewer than 279 eighth powers

=== 6400 to 6499 ===
- 6441 – triangular number
- 6449 – Sophie Germain prime
- 6466 – Markov number
- 6480 – smallest number with exactly 50 factors
- 6491 – Sophie Germain prime

=== 6500 to 6599 ===
- 6509 – highly cototient number
- 6521 – Sophie Germain prime
- 6542 – number of primes $\leq 2^{16}$.
- 6545 – tetrahedral number
- 6551 – Sophie Germain prime
- 6555 – triangular number
- 6556 – member of a Ruth-Aaron pair with 6557 (first definition)
- 6557 – member of a Ruth-Aaron pair with 6556 (first definition)
- 6561 = 81^{2} = 9^{4} = 3^{8}, perfect totient number
- 6563 – Sophie Germain prime
- 6581 – Sophie Germain prime
- 6599 – safe prime

=== 6600 to 6699 ===
- 6601 – Carmichael number, decagonal number, sum of the first 56 primes
- 6623 – centered heptagonal number
- 6659 – safe prime
- 6666 – forty-fourth nonagonal number, and the 11th third-convolution of Fibonacci numbers.
- 6670 – triangular number, centered nonagonal number, centered 19-gonal number,

=== 6700 to 6799 ===
- 6719 – safe prime, highly cototient number
- 6733 – star prime
- 6728 – number of domino tilings of a 6×6 checkerboard
- 6761 – Sophie Germain prime
- 6765 – 20th Fibonacci number
- 6779 – safe prime
- 6786 – triangular number

=== 6800 to 6899 ===
- 6811 – member of a Ruth-Aaron pair with 6812 (first definition)
- 6812 – member of a Ruth-Aaron pair with 6811 (first definition)
- 6827 – safe prime
- 6841 – largest right-truncatable prime in base 7
- 6842 – number of parallelogram polyominoes with 12 cells
- 6863 – balanced prime
- 6870 – sum of the first 57 primes
- 6879 – number of planar partitions of 15
- 6880 – vampire number
- 6889 = 83^{2}, centered octagonal number
- 6899 – Sophie Germain prime, safe prime

=== 6900 to 6999 ===
- 6903 – triangular number
- 6924 – magic constant of n × n normal magic square and n-Queens Problem for n = 24.
- 6929 – highly cototient number
- 6930 – decagonal number, square pyramidal number
- 6931 – centered heptagonal number
- 6975 – nonagonal number
- 6977 – balanced prime
- 6983 – Sophie Germain prime, safe prime
- 6997 – 900th prime number

=== Prime numbers ===
There are 117 prime numbers between 6000 and 7000:

6007, 6011, 6029, 6037, 6043, 6047, 6053, 6067, 6073, 6079, 6089, 6091, 6101, 6113, 6121, 6131, 6133, 6143, 6151, 6163, 6173, 6197, 6199, 6203, 6211, 6217, 6221, 6229, 6247, 6257, 6263, 6269, 6271, 6277, 6287, 6299, 6301, 6311, 6317, 6323, 6329, 6337, 6343, 6353, 6359, 6361, 6367, 6373, 6379, 6389, 6397, 6421, 6427, 6449, 6451, 6469, 6473, 6481, 6491, 6521, 6529, 6547, 6551, 6553, 6563, 6569, 6571, 6577, 6581, 6599, 6607, 6619, 6637, 6653, 6659, 6661, 6673, 6679, 6689, 6691, 6701, 6703, 6709, 6719, 6733, 6737, 6761, 6763, 6779, 6781, 6791, 6793, 6803, 6823, 6827, 6829, 6833, 6841, 6857, 6863, 6869, 6871, 6883, 6899, 6907, 6911, 6917, 6947, 6949, 6959, 6961, 6967, 6971, 6977, 6983, 6991, 6997

== See also ==
- Year 6000
