= 593 (number) =

← 592	593	594 →
- List of numbers; Integers; ← 0 100 200 300 400 500 600 700 800 900 →
- Cardinal: five hundred ninety-three
- Ordinal: 593rd (five hundred ninety-third)
- Factorization: prime
- Divisors: 1, 593
- Greek numeral: ΦϞΓ´
- Roman numeral: DXCIII, dxciii
- Binary: 1001010001_{2}
- Ternary: 210222_{3}
- Senary: 2425_{6}
- Octal: 1121_{8}
- Duodecimal: 415_{12}
- Hexadecimal: 251_{16}

593 (five hundred [and] ninety-three) is the natural number following 592 and preceding 594.

== In mathematics ==
593 is the 108th prime number. It is also a Sophie Germain prime, a right-truncatable prime, a Pythagorean prime, a balanced prime, and a Ramanujan prime. 593 is an example of what Paul Erdős and Ernst G. Straus called a good prime, or a prime whose square is greater than the product of its neighboring two primes.

593 is most notable for being a Leyland number, since it can be expressed in the form $x^y + y^x$, specifically as:

$$9^2 + 2^9$$

But since it is prime, it is also a Leyland prime, most specifically the second one.
