= 13 (number) =

← 12	13	14 →
- ← 10 11 12 13 14 15 16 17 18 19 →: List of numbers; Integers; ← 0 10 20 30 40 50 60 70 80 90 →
- Cardinal: thirteen
- Ordinal: 13th (thirteenth)
- Numeral system: tredecimal
- Factorization: prime
- Prime: 6th
- Divisors: 1, 13
- Greek numeral: ΙΓ´
- Roman numeral: XIII, xiii
- Binary: 1101_{2}
- Ternary: 111_{3}
- Senary: 21_{6}
- Octal: 15_{8}
- Duodecimal: 11_{12}
- Hexadecimal: D_{16}
- Hebrew numeral: י"ג
- Babylonian numeral: 𒌋𒐗

13 (thirteen) is the natural number following 12 and preceding 14.

Folklore surrounding the number 13 appears in many cultures around the world: one theory is that this is due to the cultures employing lunar-solar calendars (there are approximately 12.41 lunations per solar year, and hence 12 "true months" plus a smaller, and often portentous, thirteenth month). This can be witnessed, for example, in the "Twelve Days of Christmas" of Western European tradition.

== In mathematics ==
The number 13 is a prime number, happy number and a lucky number. It is a twin prime with 11, as well as a cousin prime with 17. It is the second of the only three known Wilson primes: 5, 13, and 563. A 13-sided regular polygon is called a tridecagon.

13 is a Fibonacci number and an ordered Bell number. In Sanskrit prosody, there are 13 combinations of light and heavy syllables that add to six morae, since 13 is a Fibonacci number. Because 13 is an ordered bell number, there are 13 orders in which a three-way horse race can finish, allowing for ties.

=== List of basic calculations ===
Multiplication	1	2	3	4	5	6	7	8	9	10	11	12	13	14	15	16	17	18	19	20	21	22	23	24	25	50	100	1000
(13)x	13	26	39	52	65	78	91	104	117	130	143	156	169	182	195	208	221	234	247	260	273	286	299	312	325	650	1300	13000

Division	1	2	3	4	5	6	7	8	9	10	11	12	13	14	15
13 ÷ x	13	6.5	4.3̅	3.25	2.6	2.16̅	1.8̅5̅7̅1̅4̅2̅	1.625	1.4̅	1.3	1.1̅8̅	1.083̅	1	0.92̅8̅5̅7̅1̅4̅	0.86̅
x ÷ 13	0.0̅7̅6̅9̅2̅3̅	0.1̅5̅3̅8̅4̅6̅	0.2̅3̅0̅7̅6̅9̅	0.3̅0̅7̅6̅9̅2̅	0.3̅8̅4̅6̅1̅5̅	0.4̅6̅1̅5̅3̅8̅	0.5̅3̅8̅4̅6̅1̅	0.6̅1̅5̅3̅8̅4̅	0.6̅9̅2̅3̅0̅7̅	0.7̅6̅9̅2̅3̅0̅	0.8̅4̅6̅1̅5̅3̅	0.9̅2̅3̅0̅7̅6̅	1	1.0̅7̅6̅9̅2̅3̅	1.1̅5̅3̅8̅4̅6̅

Exponentiation	1	2	3	4	5	6	7	8	9	10	11
13^{x}	13	169	2197	28561	371293	4826809	62748517	815730721	10604499373	137858491849	1792160394037
x^{13}	1	8192	1594323	67108864	1220703125	13060694016	96889010407	549755813888	2541865828329	10000000000000	34522712143931

== In languages ==
=== Grammar ===
In all Germanic languages, 13 is the first compound number; the numbers 11 and 12 have their own names.

==== Folklore ====
In Germany, according to an old tradition, 13 (dreizehn), as the first compound number, was the first number written in digits; the numbers 0 (null) through 12 (zwölf) were spelled out. The Duden (the German standard dictionary) now calls this tradition (which was actually never written down as an official rule) outdated and no longer valid, but many writers still follow it.

=== In English ===
Thirteen is one of two numbers within the teen numerical range (13–19), along with fifteen, not derived by cardinal numeral (three) and the teen suffix; instead, it is derived from the ordinal numeral (third).

== In religion ==
=== Islam ===
In Shia, 13 signifies the 13th day of the month of Rajab (the Lunar calendar), which is the birth of Imam Ali.

=== Catholicism ===
In Catholic devotional practice, the number thirteen is also associated with Saint Anthony of Padua, since his feast day falls on June 13. A traditional devotion called the Thirteen Tuesdays of St. Anthony involves praying to the saint every Tuesday over a period of thirteen weeks. Another devotion, St. Anthony's Chaplet, consists of thirteen decades of three beads each.

=== Sikhism ===
According to famous Sakhi (evidence) or the story of Guru Nanak Dev Ji, when he was an accountant at a town of Sultanpur Lodhi, he was distributing groceries to people. When he gave groceries to the 13th person, he stopped because in Gurmukhi and Hindi the word 13 is called terah, which means yours. And Guru Nanak Dev Ji kept saying, "Yours, yours, yours..." remembering God. People reported to the emperor that Guru Nanak Dev Ji was giving out free food to the people. When treasures were checked, there was more money than before.

=== Judaism ===
In Judaism, 13 signifies the age at which a boy matures and becomes a Bar Mitzvah, i.e., a full member of the Jewish faith (counts as a member of Minyan).

=== Wicca ===
A common tradition in the religion Wicca holds that the number of members for a coven is ideally thirteen, though this tradition is not universal.

== Luck ==
=== Bad ===
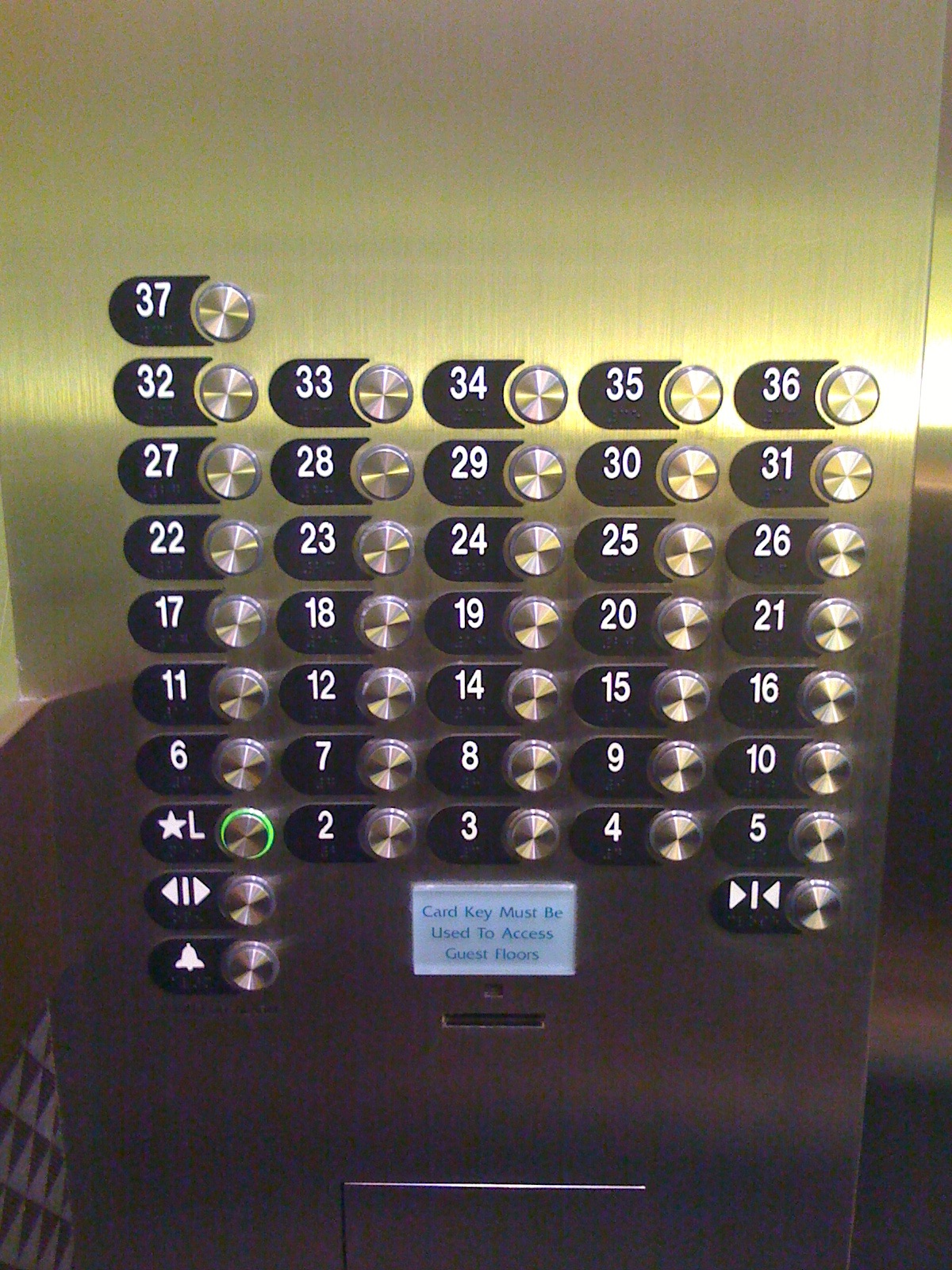
Buttons in an elevator show that floor numbers skip from 12 to 14, to avoid labeling a floor as the thirteenth.

The number 13 is considered an unlucky number in some countries. The end of the Mayan calendar's 13th Baktun was superstitiously feared as a harbinger of the apocalyptic 2012 phenomenon. Fear of the number 13 has a specifically recognized phobia, triskaidekaphobia, a word first recorded in 1911. The superstitious sufferers of triskaidekaphobia try to avoid bad luck by keeping away from anything numbered or labelled thirteen. As a result, companies and manufacturers use another way of numbering or labelling to avoid the number, with hotels and tall buildings being conspicuous examples (thirteenth floor). It is also considered unlucky to have thirteen guests at a table. Friday the 13th has been considered an unlucky day.

There are a number of theories as to why the number thirteen became associated with bad luck, but none of them have been accepted as likely.

The Last Supper
Jesus Christ's Last Supper, there were thirteen people around the table, counting Christ and the twelve apostles. Some believe this is unlucky because one of those thirteen, Judas Iscariot, was the betrayer of Jesus Christ. From the 1890s, a number of English language sources relate the "unlucky" thirteen to an idea that at the Last Supper, Judas, the disciple who betrayed Jesus, was the 13th to sit at the table.
Knights Templar
On Friday, 13 October 1307, King Philip IV of France ordered the arrest of the Knights Templar, and most of the knights were tortured and killed.
Full moons
A year with 13 full moons instead of 12 posed problems for the monks in charge of the calendars. "This was considered a very unfortunate circumstance, especially by the monks who had charge of the calendar of thirteen months for that year, and it upset the regular arrangement of church festivals. For this reason, thirteen came to be considered an unlucky number." However, a typical century has about 37 years that have 13 full moons, compared to 63 years with 12 full moons, and typically every third or fourth year has 13 full moons.
A suppressed lunar cult
In ancient cultures, the number 13 represented femininity, because it corresponded to the number of lunar (menstrual) cycles in a year (13 × 28 = 364 days). The theory is that, as the solar calendar triumphed over the lunar, the number thirteen became anathema.
Hammurabi's code
There is a myth that the earliest reference to thirteen being unlucky or evil is in the Babylonian Code of Hammurabi (circa 1780 BC), where the thirteenth law is said to be omitted. In fact, the original Code of Hammurabi has no numeration. The translation by L.W. King (1910), edited by Richard Hooker, omitted one article: If the seller have gone to (his) fate (i. e., have died), the purchaser shall recover damages in said case fivefold from the estate of the seller. Other translations of the Code of Hammurabi, for example the translation by Robert Francis Harper, include the 13th article.

=== Good ===
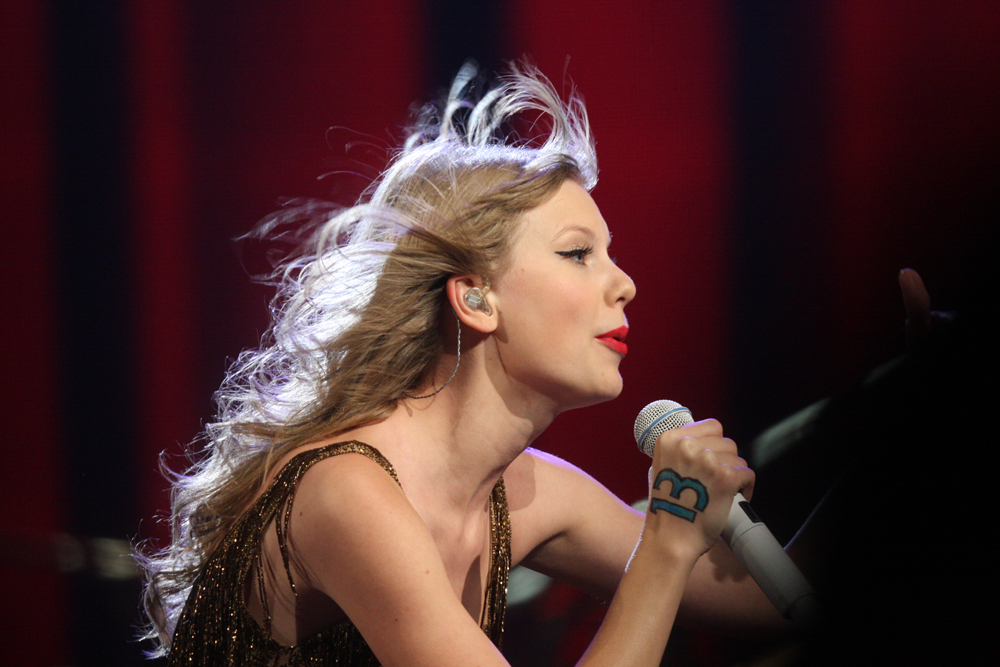
American singer-songwriter Taylor Swift considers the number 13 to be lucky and references it throughout her work.

- In France, 13 was traditionally considered a lucky number in France prior to the First World War, and was used in numerical form as a good luck symbol on postcards and charms.
- In Italy, 13 was the lucky number in the Italian football pools (Totocalcio). The Italian expression "fare tredici" (literally, "make thirteen") means to hit the jackpot.
- Colgate University also considers 13 a lucky number. The university was founded in 1819 by 13 men with 13 dollars, 13 prayers and 13 articles. (To this day, members of the Colgate community consider the number 13 a good omen.) In fact, the campus address is 13 Oak Drive in Hamilton, New York, and the male a cappella group is called the Colgate 13.

=== Other ===
A baker's dozen, devil's dozen, long dozen, or long measure is 13, one more than a standard dozen. The thirteenth loaf is called the vantage loaf because it is considered advantageous overall to get 13 loaves for the price of 12.

In a tarot card deck, XIII is the card of Death, usually picturing the Pale Horse with its rider.

The number 13 is a recurring motif in American heraldry, referencing the 13 Colonies that formed the United States.

== Age 13 ==
- In Judaism, thirteen signifies the age at which a boy matures and becomes a Bar Mitzvah, i.e., a full member of the Jewish faith.
- Thirteen is the minimum age of consent in Argentina, Burkina Faso, Niger, and two Mexican states.
- On many social media platforms in the United States, 13 is the standard minimum age to be allowed to create an account in compliance with the Children's Online Privacy Protection Act (COPPA).
- This is the age at which the Entertainment Software Rating Board (ESRB) assesses for T-rated games and the Motion Picture Association recommends movies with a PG-13 rating.

== In sports ==
- The number 13 was not used in the Indianapolis 500 from 1915 to 2002. It was not permitted for use between 1926 and 2002. In 2009, E. J. Viso, driving for HVM Racing in the 2009 IndyCar Series season, drove a green number 13 car full-time, despite terrible superstitions about it in motorsports.
- The number 13 was not used in Formula One from 1977 to 2013.
- In rugby league:
  - The jersey number 13 is worn by the starting loose forward or lock forward in most competitions. An exception is in the Super League, which uses static squad numbering.
- In rugby union, the jersey number 13 is worn by the outside centre.
- In triathlon, the number 13 is not used. As such, the numbering goes 11, 12, 14, 15 under the current numbering system.
- In cycle sport events like the Tour de France, riders assigned the number 13 will often wear their race bib upside down.
