= 877 (number) =

Natural number

← 876	877	878 →
- List of numbers; Integers; ← 0 100 200 300 400 500 600 700 800 900 →
- Cardinal: eight hundred seventy-seven
- Ordinal: 877th (eight hundred seventy-seventh)
- Factorization: prime
- Divisors: 1, 877
- Greek numeral: ΩΟΖ´
- Roman numeral: DCCCLXXVII, dccclxxvii
- Binary: 1101101101_{2}
- Ternary: 1012111_{3}
- Senary: 4021_{6}
- Octal: 1555_{8}
- Duodecimal: 611_{12}
- Hexadecimal: 36D_{16}

877 (eight hundred [and] seventy-seven) is the natural number following 878 and preceding 876. It is also known as B_{7}. (Note: B_{7} is the mathematical notation of the 7th bell number.)

== In mathematics ==
877 is the 151st prime number, a de Polignac prime, an isolated prime, and a prime-indexed prime. 877 is one of only two known primes p such that (p, p − 9) is an irregular pair. There are no further terms found up to 163577833 in extended tables.

877 is also a Bell number, since it satisfies the recurrence relation

$B{\scriptstyle n + 1} = \sum_{k=0}^{n} (\frac{n}{k}) B{\scriptstyle k}, n \ge 1$

Since 877 is a prime, it is also known as a Bell prime, which is the 3rd one. Out of the first 14 Bell numbers, only four are prime, which includes 877 (2, 5, 877, 27644437). The next two are

- $B{\scriptstyle 42}$ = 35742549198872617291353508656626642567
- $B{\scriptstyle 55}$ = 359334085968622831041960188598043661065388726959079837.
