= 613 (number) =

← 612	613	614 →
- List of numbers; Integers; ← 0 100 200 300 400 500 600 700 800 900 →
- Cardinal: six hundred thirteen
- Ordinal: 613th (six hundred thirteenth)
- Factorization: prime
- Prime: yes
- Greek numeral: ΧΙΓ´
- Roman numeral: DCXIII, dcxiii
- Binary: 1001100101_{2}
- Ternary: 211201_{3}
- Senary: 2501_{6}
- Octal: 1145_{8}
- Duodecimal: 431_{12}
- Hexadecimal: 265_{16}

613 (six hundred [and] thirteen) is the natural number following 612 and preceding 614.

== Mathematical properties ==
613 is a prime number, the first number of a prime triplet (p, p + 4, p + 6) and middle number of sexy prime triple (p − 6, p, p + 6). It is the index of a prime Lucas number.

613 is a centered square number with 18 per side, a circular number of 21 with a square grid and 27 using a triangular grid. It is also 17-gonal.

613 is the sum of squares of two consecutive integers, 17 and 18, and is also a lucky number and thus a lucky prime.

== Judaism ==
The 613 commandments (Hebrew: תרי"ג מצוות: taryag mitzvot, "613 Mitzvot"): 613 is the traditional number of mitzvot in the Jewish Torah, even though the actual number of commands exceeds 2,000, such that the number 613 reflects some underlying yet unstated concept. Indeed, the earliest extant mention of this traditional number is found in Tractate Makkot (on page 23b) in the Talmud, where Rav Simla'i reports the number without a source.

Some Jewish commentaries equate the curtains of the Mishkan (i.e. the Tabernacle) with the commandments. Each curtain was 112 square cubits (4x28)—and 613 is the 112th prime number.

In Kabbalah, the number 613 is very significant, with every complete entity seen as being divisible into 613 parts: 613 parts to every Sefirah; 613 parts to each of the divine mitzvot in the Torah; and 613 parts to the human body (which is also stated by R. Simla'i in the Talmudic passage noted above).

Starting in the 19th century, some Jewish sources claim that there is a tradition that pomegranates have 613 seeds, though this is clearly symbolic as there is no fixed number, and it is generally about 200 to 1400 seeds in reality.

== Other occurrences ==
The number 613 hangs from the rafters at Madison Square Garden in honor of legendary New York Knicks coach Red Holzman's 613 victories.

In Scandal, the secret agency is known as B613.

613 is the area code for Ottawa and elsewhere in eastern Ontario.

== See also ==
- The years 613 and 613 BC
- List of highways numbered 613
- The asteroid 613 Ginevra
- United Nations Security Council Resolution 613
