= 347 (number) =

← 346	347	348 →
- List of numbers; Integers; ← 0 100 200 300 400 500 600 700 800 900 →
- Cardinal: three hundred forty-seven
- Ordinal: 347th (three hundred forty-seventh)
- Factorization: prime
- Divisors: 1, 347
- Greek numeral: ΤΜΖ´
- Roman numeral: CCCXLVII, cccxlvii
- Binary: 101011011_{2}
- Ternary: 110212_{3}
- Senary: 1335_{6}
- Octal: 533_{8}
- Duodecimal: 24B_{12}
- Hexadecimal: 15B_{16}

347 (three hundred [and] forty seven) is the natural number following 346 and preceding 348.

== In mathematics ==
347 is the 69th prime number. It is also a twin prime with 349, a safe prime, a Higgs prime, and a Ramanujan prime. It is the smallest prime number which the product of its digits is equal to two times the number of digits times the sum of digits. If the digits are reversed, it becomes 743, which is also a prime, meaning that 347 is an emirp. 347 is a Friedman number, but since it is a prime, it is also a Friedman prime. 347 is a strictly non-palindromic number. 347 is a member of the toothpick sequence, and it is the number of toothpicks in stage 25 of the toothpick structure.

== Other uses ==
- 347 is the number of chess games that end in checkmate after exactly 5 plies.
- A human D-amino acid oxidase contains 347 amino acids.
