= 17 (number) =

← 16	17	18 →
- ← 10 11 12 13 14 15 16 17 18 19 →: List of numbers; Integers; ← 0 10 20 30 40 50 60 70 80 90 →
- Cardinal: seventeen
- Ordinal: 17th (seventeenth)
- Numeral system: septendecimal
- Factorization: prime
- Prime: 7th
- Divisors: 1, 17
- Greek numeral: ΙΖ´
- Roman numeral: XVII, xvii
- Binary: 10001_{2}
- Ternary: 122_{3}
- Senary: 25_{6}
- Octal: 21_{8}
- Duodecimal: 15_{12}
- Hexadecimal: 11_{16}
- Hebrew numeral: י"ז
- Babylonian numeral: 𒌋𒐛

17 (seventeen) is the natural number following 16 and preceding 18. It is a prime number.

== Mathematics ==
17 is a Leyland number and Leyland prime, using 2 and 3 (2^{3} + 3^{2}), and using 3 and 4 (3^{4} - 4^{3}). 17 is one of five known Fermat primes, and one of six total lucky numbers of Euler.

Since seventeen is a Fermat prime, regular heptadecagons can be constructed with a compass and unmarked ruler. This was proven by Carl Friedrich Gauss and ultimately led him to choose mathematics over philology for his studies.

The minimum possible number of givens for a sudoku puzzle with a unique solution is 17.

=== Geometric properties ===
==== Two-dimensions ====
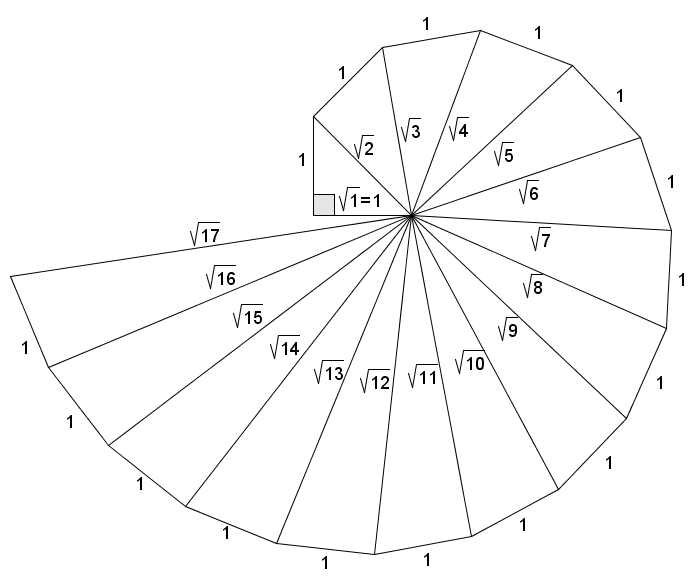
The Spiral of Theodorus, with a maximum right triangles laid edge-to-edge before one revolution is completed. The largest triangle has a hypotenuse of $\sqrt {17}.$

There are seventeen crystallographic space groups in two dimensions. These are sometimes called wallpaper groups, as they represent the seventeen possible symmetry types that can be used for wallpaper.

Also in two dimensions, seventeen is the number of combinations of regular polygons that completely fill a plane vertex. Eleven of these belong to regular and semiregular tilings, while 6 of these (3.7.42, 3.8.24, 3.9.18, 3.10.15, 4.5.20, and 5.5.10) exclusively surround a point in the plane and fill it only when irregular polygons are included.

Seventeen is the minimum number of vertices on a two-dimensional graph such that, if the edges are colored with three different colors, there is bound to be a monochromatic triangle; see Ramsey's theorem.

Either 16 or 18 unit squares can be formed into rectangles with perimeter equal to the area; and there are no other natural numbers with this property. The Platonists regarded this as a sign of their peculiar propriety; and Plutarch notes it when writing that the Pythagoreans "utterly abominate" 17, which "bars them off from each other and disjoins them".

17 is the least $k$ for the Theodorus Spiral to complete one revolution. This, in the sense of Plato, who questioned why Theodorus (his tutor) stopped at $\sqrt{17}$ when illustrating adjacent right triangles whose bases are units and heights are successive square roots, starting with $1$. In part due to Theodorus's work as outlined in Plato's Theaetetus, it is believed that Theodorus had proved all the square roots of non-square integers from 3 to 17 are irrational by means of this spiral.

==== Enumeration of icosahedron stellations ====
In three-dimensional space, there are seventeen distinct fully supported stellations generated by an icosahedron. The seventeenth prime number is 59, which is equal to the total number of stellations of the icosahedron by Miller's rules. Without counting the icosahedron as a zeroth stellation, this total becomes 58, a count equal to the sum of the first seven prime numbers (2 + 3 + 5 + 7 ... + 17). Seventeen distinct fully supported stellations are also produced by truncated cube and truncated octahedron.

==== Four-dimensional zonotopes ====
Seventeen is also the number of four-dimensional parallelotopes that are zonotopes. Another 34, or twice 17, are Minkowski sums of zonotopes with the 24-cell, itself the simplest parallelotope that is not a zonotope.

==== Abstract algebra ====
Seventeen is the highest dimension for paracompact Vineberg polytopes with rank $n+2$ mirror facets, with the lowest belonging to the third.

17 is a supersingular prime, because it divides the order of the Monster group. If the Tits group is included as a non-strict group of Lie type, then there are seventeen total classes of Lie groups that are simultaneously finite and simple (see classification of finite simple groups). In base ten, (17, 71) form the seventh permutation class of permutable primes.

=== Other interesting properties ===
The sequence of residues (mod n) of a googol and googolplex, for $n=1, 2, 3, ...$, agree up until $n=17$.

A series of length seventeen is the longest sequence for which a solution exists in the irregularity of distributions problem.

There are seventeen elementary particles in the Standard Model of physics.

== Other fields ==
=== Poetry ===
17 is the number of syllables in a traditional Japanese haiku, arranged in 3 lines of 5, 7, and 5 syllables.

=== Psychology ===
17 was described at MIT as "the least random number", according to the Jargon File. This is supposedly because, in a study where respondents were asked to choose a random number from 1 to 20, 17 was the most common choice. This study has been repeated a number of times.
