= 563 (number) =

← 562	563	564 →
- List of numbers; Integers; ← 0 100 200 300 400 500 600 700 800 900 →
- Cardinal: five hundred sixty-three
- Ordinal: 563rd (five hundred sixty-third)
- Factorization: prime
- Divisors: 1, 563
- Greek numeral: ΦΞΓ´
- Roman numeral: DLXIII, dlxiii
- Binary: 1000110011_{2}
- Ternary: 202212_{3}
- Senary: 2335_{6}
- Octal: 1063_{8}
- Duodecimal: 3AB_{12}
- Hexadecimal: 233_{16}

563 (five hundred [and] sixty-three) is the natural number following 562 and preceding 564.

== In mathematics ==
563 is the 103rd prime number. It is also a safe prime, a Chen prime, an Eisenstein prime with no imaginary part, a balanced prime, a sexy prime with 569, a happy prime, a prime-indexed prime, and a strictly non-palindromic number.

5^{563} - 4^{563} is prime.

=== Wilson Prime ===
563 is the largest known Wilson prime. It was discovered by Goldberg in the year 1953 by using the Bureau of Standards Eastern Automatic Computer to search all primes less than 10000. Six months after the completion of the table, Donald Wall computed a table of Wilson Quotients for all primes less than 5000 and independently discovered 563 as the third Wilson prime.
