= Prime factor exponent notation =

In his 1557 work The Whetstone of Witte, British mathematician Robert Recorde proposed an exponent notation by prime factorisation, which remained in use up until the eighteenth century and acquired the name Arabic exponent notation. The principle of Arabic exponents was quite similar to Egyptian fractions; large exponents were broken down into smaller prime numbers. Squares and cubes were so called; prime numbers from five onwards were called sursolids.

Although the terms used for defining exponents differed between authors and times, the general system was the primary exponent notation until René Descartes devised the Cartesian exponent notation, which is still used today.

This is a list of Recorde's terms:

Cartesian index	Arabic index	Recordian symbol	Explanation
1	Simple		
2	Square (compound form is zenzic)	z	
3	Cubic	cꝭ	
4	Zenzizenzic (biquadratic)	zz	square of squares
5	First sursolid	ß	first prime exponent greater than three
6	Zenzicubic	zcꝭ	square of cubes
7	Second sursolid	Bß	second prime exponent greater than three
8	Zenzizenzizenzic (quadratoquadratoquadratum)	zzz	square of squared squares
9	Cubicubic	cꝭcꝭ	cube of cubes
10	Square of first sursolid	zß	square of five
11	Third sursolid	Cß	third prime number greater than 3
12	Zenzizenzicubic	zzcꝭ	square of square of cubes
13	Fourth sursolid	Dß	
14	Square of second sursolid	zBß	square of seven
15	Cube of first sursolid	cꝭß	cube of five
16	Zenzizenzizenzizenzic	zzzz	"square of squares, squaredly squared"
17	Fifth sursolid	Eß	
18	Zenzicubicubic	zcꝭcꝭ	
19	Sixth sursolid	Fß	
20	Zenzizenzic of first sursolid	zzß	
21	Cube of second sursolid	cꝭBß	
22	Square of third sursolid	zCß	

By comparison, here is a table of prime factors:

1 − 20
1	unit
2	2
3	3
4	2^{2}
5	5
6	2·3
7	7
8	2^{3}
9	3^{2}
10	2·5
11	11
12	2^{2}·3
13	13
14	2·7
15	3·5
16	2^{4}
17	17
18	2·3^{2}
19	19
20	2^{2}·5

21 − 40
21	3·7
22	2·11
23	23
24	2^{3}·3
25	5^{2}
26	2·13
27	3^{3}
28	2^{2}·7
29	29
30	2·3·5
31	31
32	2^{5}
33	3·11
34	2·17
35	5·7
36	2^{2}·3^{2}
37	37
38	2·19
39	3·13
40	2^{3}·5

41 − 60
41	41
42	2·3·7
43	43
44	2^{2}·11
45	3^{2}·5
46	2·23
47	47
48	2^{4}·3
49	7^{2}
50	2·5^{2}
51	3·17
52	2^{2}·13
53	53
54	2·3^{3}
55	5·11
56	2^{3}·7
57	3·19
58	2·29
59	59
60	2^{2}·3·5

61 − 80
61	61
62	2·31
63	3^{2}·7
64	2^{6}
65	5·13
66	2·3·11
67	67
68	2^{2}·17
69	3·23
70	2·5·7
71	71
72	2^{3}·3^{2}
73	73
74	2·37
75	3·5^{2}
76	2^{2}·19
77	7·11
78	2·3·13
79	79
80	2^{4}·5

81 − 100
81	3^{4}
82	2·41
83	83
84	2^{2}·3·7
85	5·17
86	2·43
87	3·29
88	2^{3}·11
89	89
90	2·3^{2}·5
91	7·13
92	2^{2}·23
93	3·31
94	2·47
95	5·19
96	2^{5}·3
97	97
98	2·7^{2}
99	3^{2}·11
100	2^{2}·5^{2}

== See also ==
- Surd

== External links (references) ==
Hutton, Chas, Mathematical dictionary (PDF), vol. 2, p. 224
