= Odia numerals =

Numeral system

Odia numerals (Odia: ସଙ୍ଖ୍ୟା), for the purposes of this article, are the numeral system of the Odia script and a variety of the Hindu–Arabic numeral system. They are used to write the Odia language.

== Cardinal numbers ==
The following table shows Odia cardinal numbers and the Odia word for each of them:

Odia numeral	Hindu-Arabic numeral	Odia word	Romanisation
୦	0	ଶୂନ/ଶୂନ୍ୟ	śūna/śūnya
୧	1	ଏକ	eka
୨	2	ଦୁଇ	dui
୩	3	ତିନି	tini
୪	4	ଚାରି	cāri
୫	5	ପାଞ୍ଚ	pāñca
୬	6	ଛଅ	chha'a
୭	7	ସାତ	sāta
୮	8	ଆଠ	āṭha
୯	9	ନଅ	na'a
୧୦	10	ଦଶ	daśa
୧୧	11	ଏଗାର	egāra
୧୨	12	ବାର	bāra
୧୩	13	ତେର	tera
୧୪	14	ଚଉଦ	cauda
୧୫	15	ପନ୍ଦର	pandara
୧୬	16	ଷୋହଳ	ṣohaḷa
୧୭	17	ସତର	satara
୧୮	18	ଅଠର	aṭhara
୧୯	19	ଉଣେଇଶି	uṇeiśi
୨୦	20	କୋଡ଼ିଏ	koṛie
୨୧	21	ଏକୋଇଶି	ekōiśi
୨୨	22	ବାଇଶି	bāiśi
୨୩	23	ତେଇଶି	teiśi
୨୪	24	ଚବିଶି	cabiśi
୨୫	25	ପଚିଶି	paciśi
୨୬	26	ଛବିଶି	chabiśi
୨୭	27	ସତେଇଶି	sateiśi
୨୮	28	ଅଠେଇଶି	aṭheiśi
୨୯	29	ଅଣତିରିଶି	aṇatiriśi
୩୦	30	ତିରିଶ	tiriśa
୩୧	31	ଏକତିରିଶି	ekatiriśi
୩୨	32	ବତିଶି	batiśi
୩୩	33	ତେତିଶି	tetiśi
୩୪	34	ଚଉତିରିଶି	cautiriśi
୩୫	35	ପଞ୍ଚତିରିଶି	pañcatiriśi
୩୬	36	ଛତିଶି	chatiśi
୩୭	37	ସଇଁତିରିଶି	saiñtiriśi
୩୮	38	ଅଠତିରିଶି	aṭhatiriśi
୩୯	39	ଅଣଚାଳିଶି	aṇacāḷiśi
୪୦	40	ଚାଳିଶ	cāḷiśa
୪୧	41	ଏକଚାଳିଶି	ekacāḷiśi
୪୨	42	ବୟାଳିଶି	bayāḷiśi
୪୩	43	ତେୟାଳିଶି	teyāḷiśi
୪୪	44	ଚଉରାଳିଶି	caurāḷiśi
୪୫	45	ପଞ୍ଚଚାଳିଶି	pañcacāḷiśi
୪୬	46	ଛୟାଳିଶି	chayāḷiśi
୪୭	47	ସତଚାଳିଶି	satacāḷiśi
୪୮	48	ଅଠଚାଳିଶି	aṭhacāḷiśi
୪୯	49	ଅଣଚାଶ	aṇacāśa
୫୦	50	ପଚାଶ	pacāśa
୫୧	51	ଏକାବନ	ekābana
୫୨	52	ବାଉନ	bāuna
୫୩	53	ତେପନ	tepana
୫୪	54	ଚଉବନ	caubana
୫୫	55	ପଞ୍ଚାବନ	pañcābana
୫୬	56	ଛପନ	chapana
୫୭	57	ସତାବନ	satābana
୫୮	58	ଅଠାବନ	aṭhābana
୫୯	59	ଅଣଷଠି	aṇaṣaṭhi
୬୦	60	ଷାଠିଏ	ṣāṭhie
୬୧	61	ଏକଷଠି	ekaṣaṭhi
୬୨	62	ବାଷଠି	bāṣaṭhi
୬୩	63	ତେଷଠି	teṣaṭhi
୬୪	64	ଚଉଷଠି	cauṣaṭhi
୬୫	65	ପଞ୍ଚଷଠି	pañcaṣaṭhi
୬୬	66	ଛଅଷଠି	cha'aṣaṭhi
୬୭	67	ସତଷଠି	sataṣaṭhi
୬୮	68	ଅଠଷଠି	aṭhaṣaṭhi
୬୯	69	ଅଣସ୍ତରି	aṇastari
୭୦	70	ସତୁରି/ସତୁରୀ	saturi/saturī
୭୧	71	ଏକସ୍ତରି	ekastari
୭୨	72	ବାସ୍ତରି	bāstari
୭୩	73	ତେସ୍ତରି	testari
୭୪	74	ଚଉସ୍ତରି	caustari
୭୫	75	ପଞ୍ଚସ୍ତରି	pañcastari
୭୬	76	ଛଅସ୍ତରି	cha'astari
୭୭	77	ସତସ୍ତରି	satastari
୭୮	78	ଅଠସ୍ତରି	aṭhastari
୭୯	79	ଅଣାଅଶୀ	aṇāaśī
୮୦	80	ଅଶୀ	aśī
୮୧	81	ଏକାଅଶୀ	ekāaśī
୮୨	82	ବୟାଅଶୀ	bayāaśī
୮୩	83	ତେୟାଅଶୀ	teyāaśī
୮୪	84	ଚଉରାଅଶୀ	caurāaśī
୮୫	85	ପଞ୍ଚାଅଶୀ	pañcāaśī
୮୬	86	ଛୟାଅଶୀ	chayāaśī
୮୭	87	ସତାଅଶୀ	satāaśī
୮୮	88	ଅଠାଅଶୀ	aṭhāaśī
୮୯	89	ଅଣାନବେ	aṇānabe
୯୦	90	ନବେ/ନବ୍ବେ	nabe/nabbe
୯୧	91	ଏକାନବେ	ekānabe
୯୨	92	ବୟାନବେ	bayānabe
୯୩	93	ତେୟାନବେ	teyānabe
୯୪	94	ଚଉରାନବେ	caurānabe
୯୫	95	ପଞ୍ଚାନବେ	pañcānabe
୯୬	96	ଛୟାନବେ	chayānabe
୯୭	97	ସତାନବେ	satānabe
୯୮	98	ଅଠାନବେ	aṭhānabe
୯୯	99	ଅନେଶୋତ	aneśota
୧୦୦	100	ଶହେ	śahe

== Large numbers ==
Odia numeral	Hindu-Arabic numeral	Odia word	Romanisation	Power notation	Short scale
୧୦	10	ଦଶ	daśa	10^{1}	Ten
୧୦୦	100	ଶହ/ଶତ	śaha/śata	10^{2}	One hundred
୧୦୦୦	1000	ସହସ୍ର/ହଜାର	sahasra/hajāra	10^{3}	One thousand
୧୦୦୦୦	10000	ଅୟୁତ/ଦଶ ହଜାର	ayuta/daśa hajāra	10^{4}	Ten thousand
୧୦୦୦୦୦	100000	ଲକ୍ଷ	lakṣa	10^{5}	One hundred thousand
୧୦୦୦୦୦୦	1000000	ନିୟୁତ/ଦଶ ଲକ୍ଷ	niyuta/daśa lakṣa	10^{6}	One million
୧୦୦୦୦୦୦୦	10000000	କୋଟି	koṭi	10^{7}	Ten million
୧୦୦୦୦୦୦୦୦	100000000	ଅର୍ବୁଦ/ଦଶ କୋଟି	arbuda/daśa koṭi	10^{8}	One hundred million
୧୦୦୦୦୦୦୦୦୦	1000000000	ବୃନ୍ଦ/ଶହ କୋଟି	brunda/śaha koṭi	10^{9}	One billion
୧୦୦୦୦୦୦୦୦୦୦	10000000000	ଖର୍ବ/ହଜାର କୋଟି	kharba/hajāra koṭi	10^{10}	Ten billion
୧୦୦୦୦୦୦୦୦୦୦୦	100000000000	ନିଖର୍ବ/ଦଶ ହଜାର କୋଟି	nikharba/daśa hajāra koṭi	10^{11}	One hundred billion
୧୦୦୦୦୦୦୦୦୦୦୦୦	1000000000000	ଶଙ୍ଖ/ଲକ୍ଷ କୋଟି	saṅkha/lakṣa koṭi	10^{12}	One trillion
୧୦୦୦୦୦୦୦୦୦୦୦୦୦	10000000000000	ପଦ୍ମ/ଦଶ ଲକ୍ଷ କୋଟି	padma/daśa lakṣa koṭi	10^{13}	Ten trillion
୧୦୦୦୦୦୦୦୦୦୦୦୦୦୦	100000000000000	ସାଗର/ଶହ ଲକ୍ଷ କୋଟି	sāgara/śaha lakṣa koṭi	10^{14}	One hundred trillion
୧୦୦୦୦୦୦୦୦୦୦୦୦୦୦୦	1000000000000000	ଅନ୍ତ୍ୟ/ହଜାର ଲକ୍ଷ କୋଟି	antya/hajāra lakṣa koṭi	10^{15}	One quadrillion
୧୦୦୦୦୦୦୦୦୦୦୦୦୦୦୦୦	10000000000000000	ମଧ୍ୟ/ଦଶ ହଜାର ଲକ୍ଷ କୋଟି	madhya/daśa hajāra lakṣa koṭi	10^{16}	Ten quadrillion
୧୦୦୦୦୦୦୦୦୦୦୦୦୦୦୦୦୦	100000000000000000	ପରାର୍ଦ୍ଧ/ଶହ ହଜାର ଲକ୍ଷ କୋଟି	parārddha/śaha hajāra lakṣa koṭi	10^{17}	One hundred quadrillion

== Ordinals ==
The following table shows Odia ordinal numbers (Odia: କ୍ରମସୂଚକ ସଙ୍ଖ୍ୟା) and the Odia word for each of them:

Odia numeral	Hindu-Arabic numeral	Odia ordinal word	Romanisation
୧	1	ପ୍ରଥମ	prathama
୨	2	ଦ୍ୱିତୀୟ	dwitīẏa
୩	3	ତୃତୀୟ	tr̥tīẏa
୪	4	ଚତୁର୍ଥ	caturtha
୫	5	ପଞ୍ଚମ	pañcama
୬	6	ଷଷ୍ଠ	ṣaṣṭha
୭	7	ସପ୍ତମ	saptama
୮	8	ଅଷ୍ଟମ	aṣṭama
୯	9	ନବମ	nabama
୧୦	10	ଦଶମ	daśama
୧୧	11	ଏକାଦଶ	ekādaśa
୧୨	12	ଦ୍ୱାଦଶ	dwādaśa
୧୩	13	ତ୍ରୟୋଦଶ	traẏodaśa
୧୪	14	ଚତୁର୍ଦ୍ଦଶ	caturddaśa
୧୫	15	ପଞ୍ଚଦଶ	pañcadaśa
୧୬	16	ଷୋଡ଼ଶ	ṣoṛaśa (ṣoḍaśa)
୧୭	17	ସପ୍ତଦଶ	saptadaśa
୧୮	18	ଅଷ୍ଟାଦଶ	aṣtādaśa
୧୯	19	ଊନବିଂଶ	ūnabiṁśa
୨୦	20	ବିଂଶ	biṁśa
୩୦	30	ତ୍ରିଂଶ	triṁśa
୪୦	40	ଚତ୍ୱାରିଂଶ	catwāriṁśa
୫୦	50	ପଞ୍ଚାଶତ୍ତମ	pañcāśattam
୬୦	60	ଷଷ୍ଠିତମ	ṣaṣṭhitama
୭୦	70	ସପ୍ତତିତମ	saptatitama
୮୦	80	ଅଶୀତିତମ	aśītitama
୯୦	90	ନବତିତମ	nabatitama
୧୦୦	100	ଶତତମ	śatatama
୧୦୦୦	1000	ସହସ୍ରତମ	sahasratama
୧୦୦୦୦୦	100000	ଲକ୍ଷତମ	makṣatama
୧୦୦୦୦୦୦୦	10000000	କୋଟିତମ	koṭitama

== Fractions ==
Fraction symbols (ଭଗ୍ନାଂଶ ଚିହ୍ନ)
Odia fractions	୵	୶	୷	୲	୳	୴
Fractions	¹/₁₆	⅛	³/₁₆	¼	½	¾

Fraction symbols are obsolete post decimalisation on 1 April 1957.

Fractions
Fractions	Romanisation	Meaning
ଅଧା	adhā	half
ସାଢ଼େ	sāṛhe	half past
ଚଉଠ	cauṭha	quarter
ତିନିପା	tinipā	three-quarters
ଦେଢ଼	deṛha	one and a half
ଅଢ଼େଇ	aṛhei	two and a half

== See also ==
- Odia script
- Indian numbering system
