= 6 =

Natural number

← 5	6	7 →
- −1 0 1 2 3 4 5 6 7 8 9 →: List of numbers; Integers; ← 0 10 20 30 40 50 60 70 80 90 →
- Cardinal: six
- Ordinal: 6th (sixth)
- Numeral system: senary
- Factorization: 2 × 3
- Divisors: 1, 2, 3, 6
- Greek numeral: Ϛ´
- Roman numeral: VI, vi, ↅ
- Greek prefix: hexa-/hex-
- Latin prefix: sexa-/sex-
- Binary: 110_{2}
- Ternary: 20_{3}
- Senary: 10_{6}
- Octal: 6_{8}
- Duodecimal: 6_{12}
- Hexadecimal: 6_{16}
- Greek: στ (or ΣΤ or ς)
- Arabic, Kurdish, Sindhi, Urdu: ٦
- Persian: ۶
- Amharic: ፮
- Bengali: ৬
- Chinese numeral: 六，陸
- Devanāgarī: ६
- Santali: ᱖
- Gujarati: ૬
- Hebrew: ו
- Khmer: ៦
- Thai: ๖
- Telugu: ౬
- Tamil: ௬
- Saraiki: ٦
- Malayalam: ൬
- Armenian: Զ
- Babylonian numeral: 𒐚
- Egyptian hieroglyph: 𓏿
- Morse code: _ ....

6 (six) is the natural number following 5 and preceding 7. It is a composite number and the smallest perfect number. It is also the first whole number that contains the letter X in its name.

== In mathematics ==
A six-sided polygon is a hexagon, one of the three regular polygons capable of tiling the plane. A hexagon also has 6 edges as well as 6 internal and external angles.

6 is the second smallest composite number. It is also the first number that is the sum of its proper divisors, making it the smallest perfect number. It is also the only perfect number that doesn't have a digital root of 1. 6 is the first unitary perfect number, since it is the sum of its positive proper unitary divisors, without including itself. Only five such numbers are known to exist. 6 is the largest of the four all-Harshad numbers.

6 is the 2nd superior highly composite number, the 2nd colossally abundant number, the 3rd triangular number, the 4th highly composite number, a pronic number, a congruent number, a harmonic divisor number, and a semiprime. 6 is also the first Granville number, or $\mathcal{S}$-perfect number. A Golomb ruler of length 6 is a "perfect ruler".

The six exponentials theorem guarantees that under certain conditions one of a set of six exponentials is transcendental. The smallest non-abelian group is the symmetric group $\mathrm {S_{3}}$ which has 3! = 6 elements. 6 the answer to the two-dimensional kissing number problem.

A regular cube, with six faces

A cube has 6 faces. A tetrahedron has 6 edges. In four dimensions, there are a total of six convex regular polytopes.

In the classification of finite simple groups, twenty of twenty-six sporadic groups in the happy family are part of three families of groups which divide the order of the friendly giant, the largest sporadic group: five first generation Mathieu groups, seven second generation subquotients of the Leech lattice, and eight third generation subgroups of the friendly giant. The remaining six sporadic groups do not divide the order of the friendly giant, which are termed the pariahs (Ly, O'N, Ru, J_{4}, J_{3}, and J_{1}).

6 is the smallest integer which is not an exponent of a prime number, making it the smallest integer greater than 1 for which there does not exist a finite field of that size.

=== List of basic calculations ===
Multiplication	1	2	3	4	5	6	7	8	9	10	11	12	13	14	15	16	17	18	19	20	25	50	100	1000
6 × x	6	12	18	24	30	36	42	48	54	60	66	72	78	84	90	96	102	108	114	120	150	300	600	6000

Division	1	2	3	4	5	6	7	8	9	10	11	12	13	14	15
6 ÷ x	6	3	2	1.5	1.2	1	0.8̅5̅7̅1̅4̅2̅	0.75	0.6̅	0.6	0.5̅4̅	0.5	0.4̅6̅1̅5̅3̅8̅	0.4̅2̅8̅5̅7̅1̅	0.4
x ÷ 6	0.16̅	0.3̅	0.5	0.6̅	0.83̅	1	1.16̅	1.3̅	1.5	1.6̅	1.83̅	2	2.16̅	2.3̅	2.5

Exponentiation	1	2	3	4	5	6	7	8	9	10	11	12	13
6^{x}	6	36	216	1296	7776	46656	279936	1679616	10077696	60466176	362797056	2176782336	13060694016
x^{6}	1	64	729	4096	15625	46656	117649	262144	531441	1000000	1771561	2985984	4826809

== Greek and Latin word parts ==
=== Hexa ===
Hexa is classical Greek for "six". Thus:

- "Hexadecimal" combines hexa- with the Latinate decimal to name a number base of 16
- A hexagon is a polygon with six sides
  - L'Hexagone is a French nickname for the continental part of Metropolitan France for its resemblance to a regular hexagon
- A hexahedron is a polyhedron with six faces, with a cube being a special case
- Hexameter is a poetic form consisting of six feet per line
- A "hex nut" is a nut with six sides, and a hex bolt has a six-sided head
- The prefix "hexa-" also occurs in the systematic name of many chemical compounds, such as hexane which has 6 carbon atoms (C_{6}H_{14}).

=== The prefix sex- ===
Sex- is a Latin prefix meaning "six". Thus:

- Senary is the ordinal adjective meaning "sixth"
- People with sexdactyly have six fingers on each hand
- The measuring instrument called a sextant got its name because its shape forms one-sixth of a whole circle
- A group of six musicians is called a sextet
- Six babies delivered in one birth are sextuplets
- Sexy prime pairs – Prime pairs differing by six are sexy, because sex is the Latin word for six.

The SI prefix for 1000^{6} is exa- (E), and for its reciprocal atto- (a).

== Evolution of the Hindu-Arabic digit ==
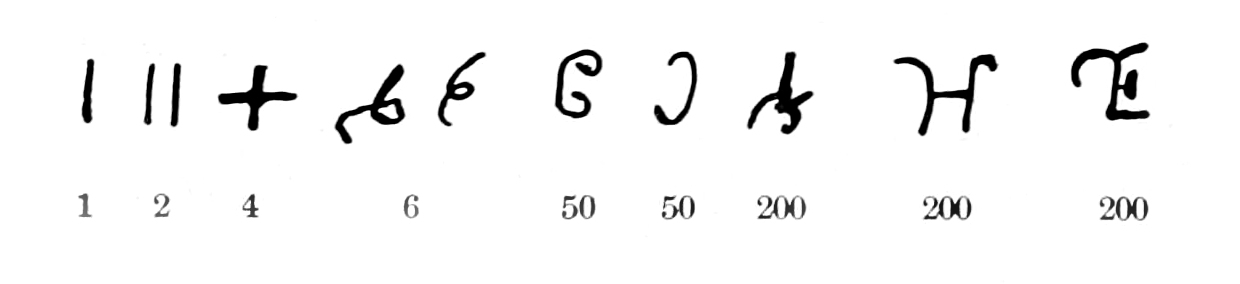
The first appearance of 6 is in the Edicts of Ashoka c. 250 BCE. These are Brahmi numerals, ancestors of Hindu-Arabic numerals.

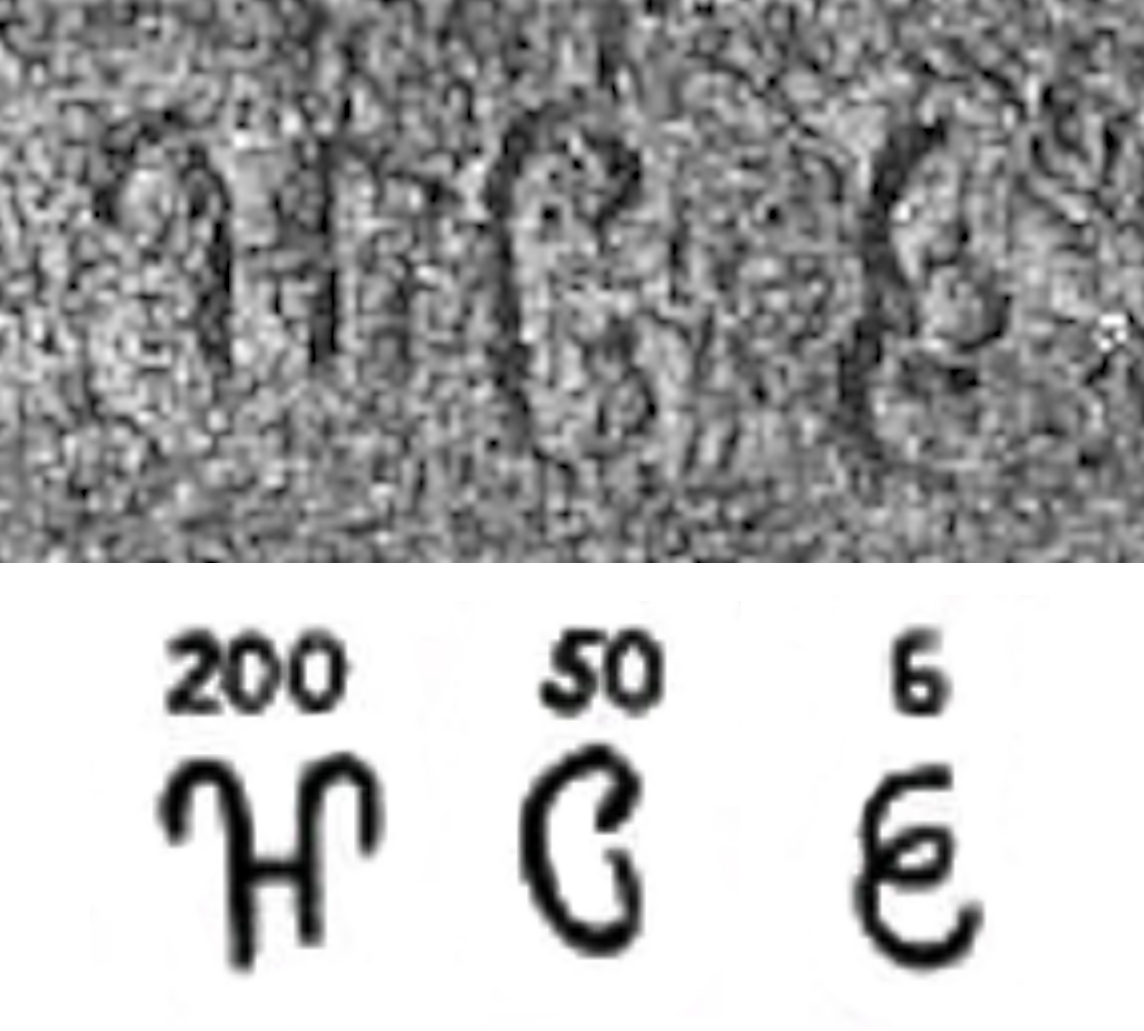
The first known digit "6" in the number "256" in Ashoka's Minor Rock Edict No.1 in Sasaram, c. 250 BCE

The evolution of the modern digit 6 appears to be more simple when compared with the other digits. The modern 6 can be traced back to the Brahmi numerals of India, which are first known from the Edicts of Ashoka c. 250 BCE. It was written in one stroke like a cursive lowercase e rotated 90 degrees clockwise. Gradually, the upper part of the stroke (above the central squiggle) became more curved, while the lower part of the stroke (below the central squiggle) became straighter. The Arabs dropped the part of the stroke below the squiggle. From there, the European evolution to our modern 6 was very straightforward, aside from a flirtation with a glyph that looked more like an uppercase G.

On the seven-segment displays of calculators and watches, 6 is usually written with six segments. Some historical calculator models use just five segments for the 6, by omitting the top horizontal bar. This glyph variant has not caught on; for calculators that can display results in hexadecimal, a 6 that looks like a "b" is not practical.

Just as in most modern typefaces, in typefaces with text figures the character for the digit 6 usually has an ascender, as, for example, in .

This digit resembles an inverted 9. To disambiguate the two on objects and documents that can be inverted, the 6 has often been underlined, both in handwriting and on printed labels.

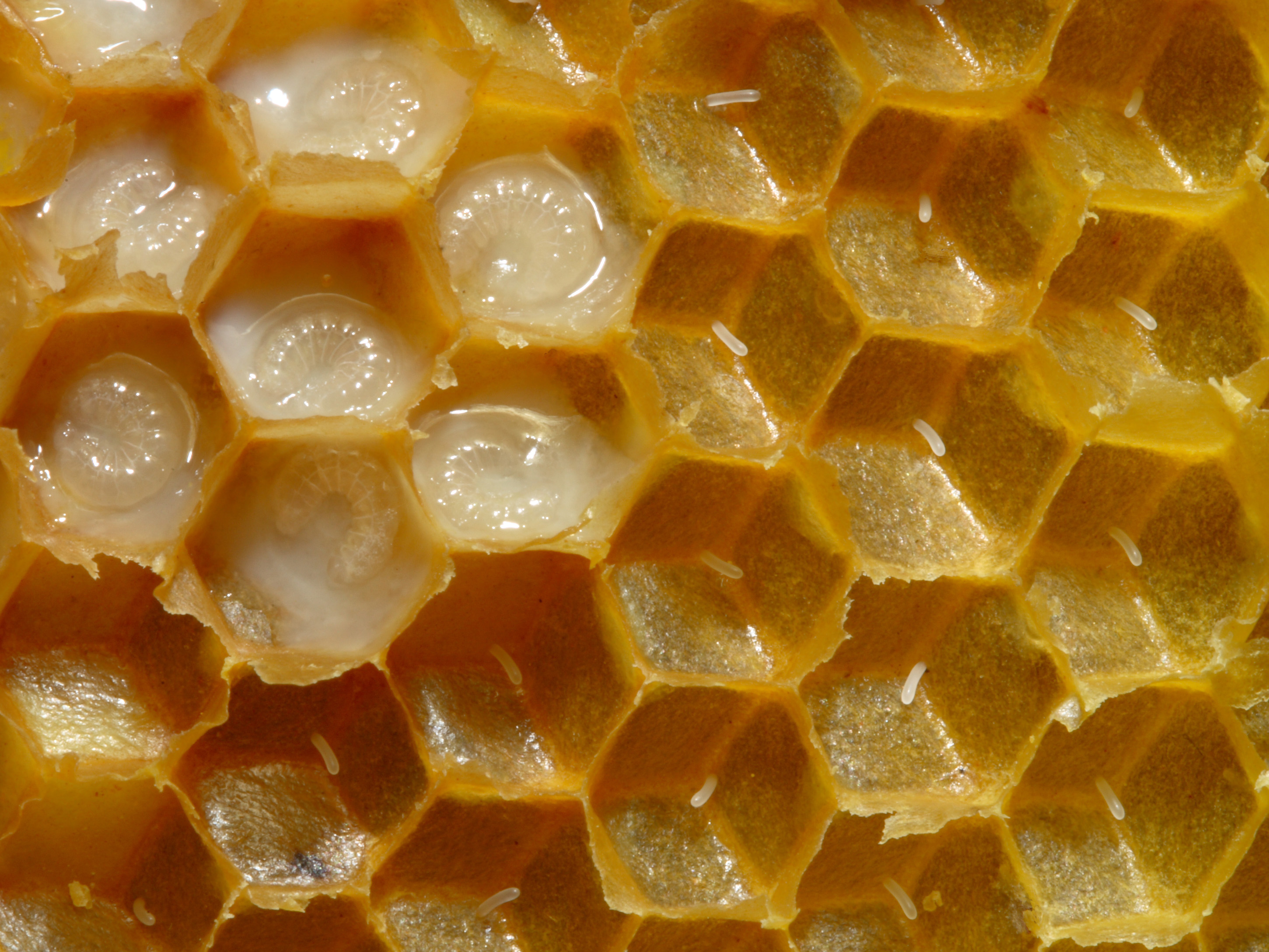
The cells of a beehive are six-sided.

== Chemistry ==
- The sixfold symmetry of snowflakes arises from the hexagonal crystal structure of ordinary ice.

== Anthropology ==
- A coffin is traditionally buried six feet under the ground; thus, the phrase "six feet under" means that a person (or thing, or concept) is dead.
- Six is a lucky number in Chinese culture.
- "Six" is used as an informal slang term for the British Secret Intelligence Service, MI6.

== See also ==
- Six degrees (disambiguation)
