= 87 (number) =

← 86	87	88 →
- ← 80 81 82 83 84 85 86 87 88 89 →: List of numbers; Integers; ← 0 10 20 30 40 50 60 70 80 90 →
- Cardinal: eighty-seven
- Ordinal: 87th (eighty-seventh)
- Factorization: 3 × 29
- Divisors: 1, 3, 29, 87
- Greek numeral: ΠΖ´
- Roman numeral: LXXXVII, lxxxvii
- Binary: 1010111_{2}
- Ternary: 10020_{3}
- Senary: 223_{6}
- Octal: 127_{8}
- Duodecimal: 73_{12}
- Hexadecimal: 57_{16}

87 (eighty-seven) is the natural number following 86 and preceding 88.

== In mathematics ==
87 is:

- the sum of the squares of the first four primes (87 = 2^{2} + 3^{2} + 5^{2} + 7^{2}).
- the sum of the sums of the divisors of the first 10 positive integers.
- the thirtieth semiprime, and the twenty-sixth distinct semiprime and the eighth of the form (3.q).
- together with 85 and 86, forms the last semiprime in the 2nd cluster of three consecutive semiprimes; the first comprising 33, 34, 35.
- with an aliquot sum of 33; itself a semiprime, within an aliquot sequence of five composite numbers (87,33,15,9,4,3,1,0) to the Prime in the 3-aliquot tree.
- 5! - 4! - 3! - 2! - 1! = 87
- the last two decimal digits of Graham's number.

== In sports ==
- Cricket in Australia holds 87 as a superstitiously unlucky score and is referred to as "the devil's number". This originates from the fact that 87 is 13 runs short of a century. 187, 287, and so on are also considered unlucky but are not as common as 87 on its own.
- Ice hockey player Sidney Crosby famously wears the number 87, which he has used throughout his career. It represents his birth date, 8/7/87, i.e., August 7, 1987.
- The number 87 is used by British Formula One driver Oliver Bearman as a tribute to his family: his father used this number in club racing.

== In culture ==
- The Gettysburg Address famously begins with the words "Four score and seven years ago...", or 87 years ago. The use of score to mean 20 is largely archaic, but the phrase "Four score and seven years ago" has become an idiom in its own right.

== In other fields ==
87 is also:

- The opus number of the 24 Preludes and Fugues of Dmitri Shostakovich.
- In model railroading, the ratio of the popular H0 scale is 1:87. Proto:87 scale claims to offer precise proportions of wheels and tracks of real railroads.
- 87 is by far the most commonly used octane rating of gasoline in the United States, Canada, Australia, and New Zealand.
