= 86 (number) =

| ← 85 | 86 | 87 → |
- ← 80 81 82 83 84 85 86 87 88 89 →: List of numbers; Integers; ← 0 10 20 30 40 50 60 70 80 90 →
- Cardinal: eighty-six
- Ordinal: 86th (eighty-sixth)
- Factorization: 2 × 43
- Divisors: 1, 2, 43, 86
- Greek numeral: ΠϚ´
- Roman numeral: LXXXVI, lxxxvi
- Binary: 1010110_{2}
- Ternary: 10012_{3}
- Senary: 222_{6}
- Octal: 126_{8}
- Duodecimal: 72_{12}
- Hexadecimal: 56_{16}

86 (eighty-six) is the natural number following 85 and preceding 87.

== In mathematics ==
86 is:

- nontotient and a noncototient;
- the 25th distinct semiprime and the 13th of the form (2q);
- together with 85 and 87, forms the middle semiprime in the 2nd cluster of three consecutive semiprimes; the first comprising 33, 34, 35;
- an Erdős–Woods number, since it is possible to find sequences of 86 consecutive integers such that each inner member shares a factor with either the first or the last member;
- a happy number and a self number in base 10;
- with an aliquot sum of 46; itself a semiprime, within an aliquot sequence of seven members (86, 46, 26, 16, 15, 9, 4, 3, 1, 0) in the prime 3-aliquot tree.

It appears in the Padovan sequence, preceded by the terms 37, 49, 65 (it is the sum of the first two of these).

It is conjectured that 86 is the largest n for which the decimal expansion of 2^{n} contains no 0.

86 = (8 × 6 = 48) + (4 × 8 = 32) + (3 × 2 = 6). That is, 86 is equal to the sum of the numbers formed in calculating its multiplicative persistence.

== In other fields ==
- In American English, and particularly in the food service industry, 86 has become a slang term referring to an item being out of stock or discontinued, and by extension to a person no longer welcome on the premises.
- 86, particularly "Hachi-Roku (ハチロク)", is often used in Japan as the nickname for the Toyota AE86.
- The Number 86 is given to the Control Agent Maxwell Smart in the Television Series Get Smart.
- The international calling code for Mainland China.
- 86 is the racing number of Chick Hicks — a character from Disney Pixar's Cars franchise.
