= 34 (number) =

← 33	34	35 →
- ← 30 31 32 33 34 35 36 37 38 39 →: List of numbers; Integers; ← 0 10 20 30 40 50 60 70 80 90 →
- Cardinal: thirty-four
- Ordinal: 34th (thirty-fourth)
- Factorization: 2 × 17
- Divisors: 1, 2, 17, 34
- Greek numeral: ΛΔ´
- Roman numeral: XXXIV, xxxiv
- Binary: 100010_{2}
- Ternary: 1021_{3}
- Senary: 54_{6}
- Octal: 42_{8}
- Duodecimal: 2A_{12}
- Hexadecimal: 22_{16}

34 (thirty-four) is the natural number following 33 and preceding 35.

== In mathematics ==
34 is the twelfth semiprime, with four divisors including 1 and itself. Specifically, 34 is the ninth distinct semiprime, it being the sixth of the form $2 \times q$. Its neighbors 33 and 35 are also distinct semiprimes with four divisors each, where 34 is the smallest number to be surrounded by numbers with the same number of divisors it has. This is the first distinct semiprime treble cluster, the next being (85, 86, 87).

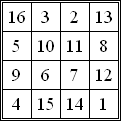

34 is the sum of the first two perfect numbers 6 + 28, whose difference is its composite index (22).

Its reduced totient and Euler totient values are both 16 (or 4^{2} = 2^{4}). The sum of all its divisors aside from one equals 53, which is the sixteenth prime number.

There is no solution to the equation φ(x) = 34, making 34 a nontotient. Nor is there a solution to the equation x − φ(x) = 34, making 34 a noncototient.

It is the third Erdős–Woods number, following 22 and 16.

It is the ninth Fibonacci number and a companion Pell number. Since it is an odd-indexed Fibonacci number, 34 is a Markov number.

34 is also the fourth heptagonal number, and the first non-trivial centered hendecagonal (11-gonal) number.

This number is also the magic constant of $n-$Queens Problem for $n=4$.

There are 34 topologically distinct convex heptahedra, excluding mirror images.

34 is the magic constant of a $4 \times 4$ normal magic square, and magic octagram (see accompanying images); it is the only $n$ for which magic constants of these $n \times n$ magic figures coincide.

== See also ==
- Rule 34
