= 85 (number) =

← 84	85	86 →
- ← 80 81 82 83 84 85 86 87 88 89 →: List of numbers; Integers; ← 0 10 20 30 40 50 60 70 80 90 →
- Cardinal: eighty-five
- Ordinal: 85th (eighty-fifth)
- Factorization: 5 × 17
- Divisors: 1, 5, 17, 85
- Greek numeral: ΠΕ´
- Roman numeral: LXXXV, lxxxv
- Binary: 1010101_{2}
- Ternary: 10011_{3}
- Senary: 221_{6}
- Octal: 125_{8}
- Duodecimal: 71_{12}
- Hexadecimal: 55_{16}

85 (eighty-five) is the natural number following 84 and preceding 86.

== In mathematics ==
85 is:

- the product of two prime numbers (5 and 17), and is therefore a semiprime of the form (5.q) where q is prime.
- specifically, the 24th Semiprime, it being the fourth of the form (5.q).
- together with 86 and 87, forms the second cluster of three consecutive semiprimes; the first comprising 33, 34, 35.
- with a prime aliquot sum of 23 in the short aliquot sequence (85,23,1,0).
- an octahedral number.
- a centered triangular number.
- a centered square number.
- a decagonal number.
- the smallest number that can be expressed as a sum of two squares, with all squares greater than 1, in two ways, 85 = 9^{2} + 2^{2} = 7^{2} + 6^{2}.
- the length of the hypotenuse of four Pythagorean triangles.
- a Smith number in decimal.

== In other fields ==
- The radix of the Ascii85 (sometimes called Base85) binary-to-text encoding
- Part of the assignation for the Toyota AE85, commonly referred to as an "eight-five".
