= 38 (number) =

← 37	38	39 →
- ← 30 31 32 33 34 35 36 37 38 39 →: List of numbers; Integers; ← 0 10 20 30 40 50 60 70 80 90 →
- Cardinal: thirty-eight
- Ordinal: 38th (thirty-eighth)
- Factorization: 2 × 19
- Divisors: 1, 2, 19, 38
- Greek numeral: ΛΗ´
- Roman numeral: XXXVIII, xxxviii
- Binary: 100110_{2}
- Ternary: 1102_{3}
- Senary: 102_{6}
- Octal: 46_{8}
- Duodecimal: 32_{12}
- Hexadecimal: 26_{16}

38 (thirty-eight) is the natural number following 37 and preceding 39.

== In mathematics ==
38! − 1 is the 16th factorial prime.

There is no answer to the equation φ(x) = 38, making 38 a nontotient.

38 is the largest even number which cannot be written as the sum of two odd composite numbers.

37 and 38 are the first pair of consecutive positive integers not divisible by any of their digits.

The sum of each row of the only non-trivial (order 3) magic hexagon is 38.

A snub cube is a archimedean solid that has 38 faces.

== In other fields ==
Ishihara test: Most people will see the number 38 but people with red-green color blindness might see 88 instead.

The 38th parallel north is the pre-Korean War boundary between North Korea and South Korea.

There are 38 slots on an American roulette wheel (0, 00, and 1 through 36; European roulette does not use the 00 slot and has only 37 slots)

The Ishihara test is a color vision test consisting of 38 pseudoisochromatic plates.

38 (XXXVIII) is the last Roman numeral by alphabetical order.

== See also ==
- List of highways numbered 38
