= 35 (number) =

← 34	35	36 →
- ← 30 31 32 33 34 35 36 37 38 39 →: List of numbers; Integers; ← 0 10 20 30 40 50 60 70 80 90 →
- Cardinal: thirty-five
- Ordinal: 35th (thirty-fifth)
- Factorization: 5 × 7
- Divisors: 1, 5, 7, 35
- Greek numeral: ΛΕ´
- Roman numeral: XXXV, xxxv
- Binary: 100011_{2}
- Ternary: 1022_{3}
- Senary: 55_{6}
- Octal: 43_{8}
- Duodecimal: 2B_{12}
- Hexadecimal: 23_{16}

35 (thirty-five) is the natural number following 34 and preceding 36.

== In mathematics ==
35 is a tetrahedral number.

The 35 free hexominoes

35 is the sum of the first five triangular numbers, making it a tetrahedral number.

35 is the 10th discrete semiprime ($5 \times 7$) and the first with 5 as the lowest non-unitary factor, thus being the first of the form (5.q) where q is a higher prime.

35 has two prime factors, (5 and 7) which also form its main factor pair (5 x 7) and comprise the second twin-prime distinct semiprime pair.

The aliquot sum of 35 is 13, within an aliquot sequence of only one composite number (35,13,1,0) to the Prime in the 13-aliquot tree. 35 is the second composite number with the aliquot sum 13; the first being the cube 27.

35 is the last member of the first triple cluster of semiprimes 33, 34, 35. The second such triple distinct semiprime cluster is 85, 86, and 87.

35 is the number of ways that three things can be selected from a set of seven unique things, also known as the "combination of seven things taken three at a time".

The sentence "This sentence is thirty-five letters long" is 35 letters long (excluding spaces and hyphen), otherwise known as an autogram.

35 is a centered cube number, a centered tetrahedral number, a pentagonal number, and a pentatope number.

35 is a highly cototient number, since there are more solutions to the equation $x - \varphi (x) = 35$ than there are for any other integers below it except 1.

There are 35 free hexominoes, the polyominoes made from six squares.

Since the greatest prime factor of $35^{2} + 1 = 1226$ is 613, which is more than 35 twice, 35 is a Størmer number.

35 is the highest number one can count to on one's fingers using senary.

35 is the number of quasigroups of order 4.

35 is the smallest composite number of the form $6k+5$, where k is a non-negative integer.
