= 81 (number) =

← 80	81	82 →
- ← 80 81 82 83 84 85 86 87 88 89 →: List of numbers; Integers; ← 0 10 20 30 40 50 60 70 80 90 →
- Cardinal: eighty-one
- Ordinal: 81st (eighty-first)
- Factorization: 3^{4}
- Divisors: 1, 3, 9, 27, 81
- Greek numeral: ΠΑ´
- Roman numeral: LXXXI, lxxxi
- Binary: 1010001_{2}
- Ternary: 10000_{3}
- Senary: 213_{6}
- Octal: 121_{8}
- Duodecimal: 69_{12}
- Hexadecimal: 51_{16}

81 (eighty-one) is the natural number following 80 and preceding 82.

== In mathematics ==
81 is:

- the square of 9 and the second fourth-power of a prime: 3^{4}.
- with an aliquot sum of 40; within an aliquot sequence of three composite numbers (81,40,50,43,1,0) to the Prime in the 43-aliquot tree.
- a perfect totient number like all powers of three.
- a heptagonal number.
- an icosioctagonal number.
- a centered octagonal number.
- a tribonacci number.
- an open meandric number.
- the ninth member of the Mian-Chowla sequence.
- a palindromic number in bases 8 (121_{8}) and 26 (33_{26}).
- a Harshad number in bases 2, 3, 4, 7, 9, 10 and 13.
- the only number in decimal whose square root equals its digit sum, both being 9. More generally, for any base $b > 1$, the corresponding number with this property is $(b-1)^2$.
- one of three non-trivial numbers (the other two are 1458 and 1729) which, when its digits (in decimal) are added together, produces a sum which, when multiplied by its reversed self, yields the original number:

8 + 1 = 9
9 × 9 = 81 (although this case is somewhat degenerate, as the sum has only a single digit).

The inverse of 81 is 0.0̅1̅2̅3̅4̅5̅6̅7̅9̅ recurring, missing only the digit "8" from the complete set of digits. This is an example of the general rule that, in base b,

$$\frac{1}{\left(b-1\right)^2} = 0.\overline{012\cdots(b-4)(b-3)(b-1)},$$

omitting only the digit b−2.

== In other fields ==
81 is also:

- The symbolic number of the Hells Angels Motorcycle Club. 'H' and 'A' are the 8th and 1st letter of the alphabet, respectively.
- 81 (八一) is referenced in flags and symbols of the People's Liberation Army as it was founded on August 1 (8/1).

=== In Sports ===
- The Number 81 is used by Formula 1 Driver Oscar Piastri
