= 83 (number) =

Number

← 82	83	84 →
- ← 80 81 82 83 84 85 86 87 88 89 →: List of numbers; Integers; ← 0 10 20 30 40 50 60 70 80 90 →
- Cardinal: eighty-three
- Ordinal: 83rd (eighty-third)
- Factorization: prime
- Prime: 23rd
- Divisors: 1, 83
- Greek numeral: ΠΓ´
- Roman numeral: LXXXIII, lxxxiii
- Binary: 1010011_{2}
- Ternary: 10002_{3}
- Senary: 215_{6}
- Octal: 123_{8}
- Duodecimal: 6B_{12}
- Hexadecimal: 53_{16}

83 (eighty-three) is the natural number following 82 and preceding 84.

== In mathematics ==
83 is a Sophie Germain prime, a safe prime, a Chen prime, and an Eisenstein prime with no imaginary part and real part of the form 3n − 1. It is a cousin prime with 79 and a sexy prime with 89. Because 83 is the 23rd prime number and 23 is prime, 83 is a super-prime.

83 is the sum of three consecutive primes (23 + 29 + 31) and the sum of five consecutive primes (11 + 13 + 17 + 19 + 23).

There are 83 primes that are right-truncatable.

83 is a highly cototient number.

== In other fields ==
The eighth letter of the alphabet is H and the third letter is C, thus 83 stands for "Heil Christ," a greeting used by organizations that consider themselves to be Christian. While not necessarily a hate symbol, it is often used by hate organizations. The Anti-Defamation League classifies 83 as a hate symbol.
