= 89 (number) =

← 88	89	90 →
- ← 80 81 82 83 84 85 86 87 88 89 →: List of numbers; Integers; ← 0 10 20 30 40 50 60 70 80 90 →
- Cardinal: eighty-nine
- Ordinal: 89th (eighty-ninth)
- Factorization: prime
- Prime: 24th
- Divisors: 1, 89
- Greek numeral: ΠΘ´
- Roman numeral: LXXXIX, lxxxix
- Binary: 1011001_{2}
- Ternary: 10022_{3}
- Senary: 225_{6}
- Octal: 131_{8}
- Duodecimal: 75_{12}
- Hexadecimal: 59_{16}

89 (eighty-nine) is the natural number following 88 and preceding 90.

== In mathematics ==
89 is:

- the 24th prime number, following 83 and preceding 97.
- a Chen prime.
- a Pythagorean prime.
- the smallest Sophie Germain prime to start a Cunningham chain of the first kind of six terms, {89, 179, 359, 719, 1439, 2879}.
- an Eisenstein prime with no imaginary part and real part of the form 3n − 1.
- The 11th Fibonacci number and thus a Fibonacci prime as well. The first few digits of its reciprocal coincide with the Fibonacci sequence due to the identity

$$\frac{1}{89}=\sum_{n=1}^\infty{F(n)\times 10^{-(n+1)}}=0.011235955\dots\ .$$

- a Markov number, appearing in solutions to the Markov Diophantine equation with other odd-indexed Fibonacci numbers.

M_{89} is the 10th Mersenne prime.

Although 89 is not a Lychrel number in base 10, it is unusual that it takes 24 iterations of the reverse and add process to reach a palindrome. Among the known non-Lychrel numbers in the first 10000 integers, no other number requires that many or more iterations. The palindrome reached is also unusually large: 8813200023188.

There are exactly 1000 prime numbers between 1 and 89^{2}=7921.

== In sports ==
- The Oklahoma City Comets, an American minor league baseball team, were formerly known as the Oklahoma 89ers (1962–1997). The number alludes to the Land Run of 1889, when the Unassigned Lands of Oklahoma were opened to white settlement. The team's home of Oklahoma City was founded during this event.
- In rugby union football, an "89" or eight-nine move is a phase following a scrum, in which the number 8 catches the ball and transfers it to number 9 (scrum half).

== In other fields ==
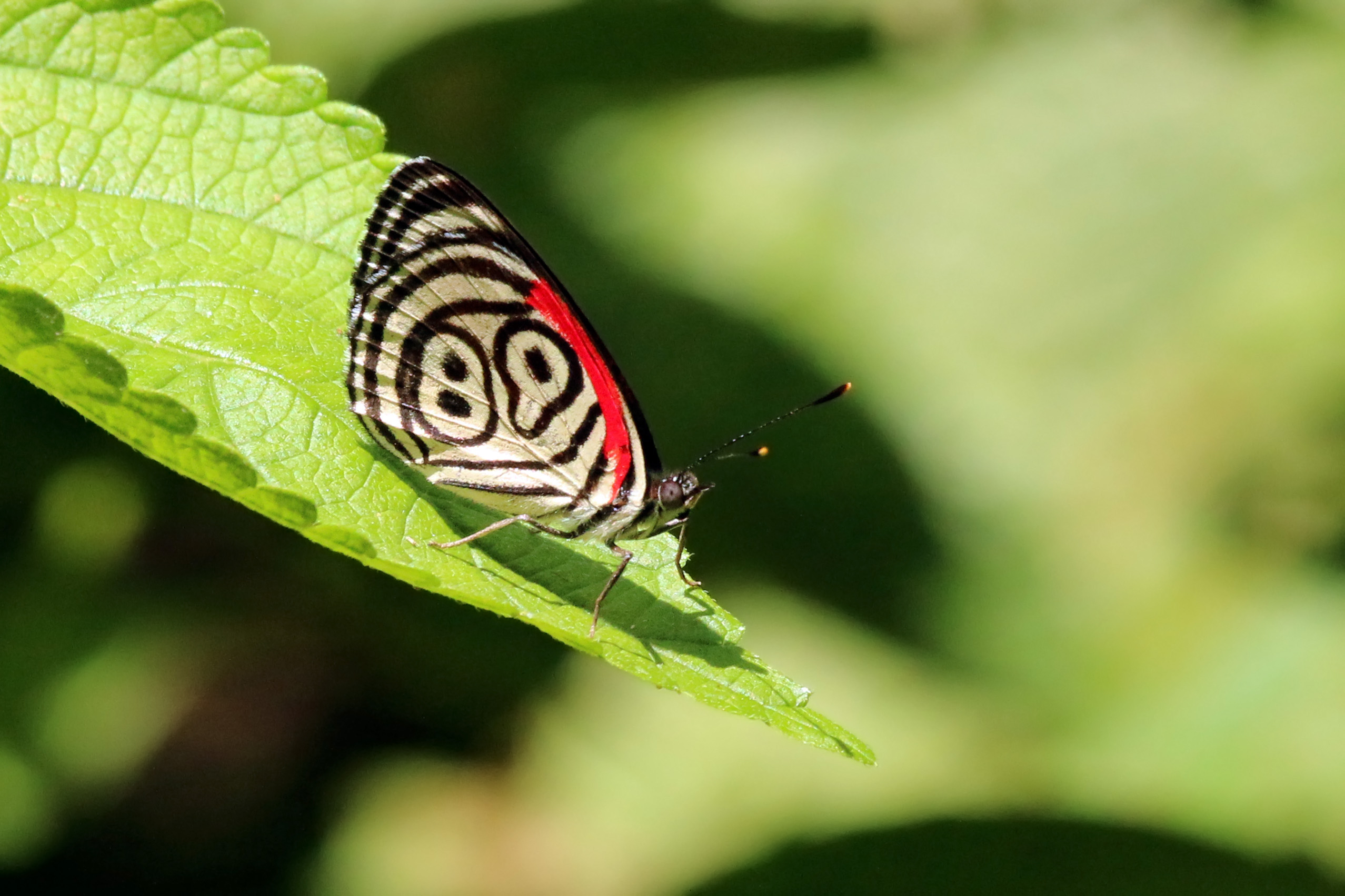
Diaethria clymena eyespots

89 is also:

- Information Is Beautiful cites eighty-nine as one of the words censored on the Chinese internet.
- A banned baby name in New Zealand.

== See also ==
- Hellin's law
