= 39 (number) =

← 38	39	40 →
- ← 30 31 32 33 34 35 36 37 38 39 →: List of numbers; Integers; ← 0 10 20 30 40 50 60 70 80 90 →
- Cardinal: thirty-nine
- Ordinal: 39th (thirty-ninth)
- Factorization: 3 × 13
- Divisors: 1, 3, 13, 39
- Greek numeral: ΛΘ´
- Roman numeral: XXXIX, xxxix
- Binary: 100111_{2}
- Ternary: 1110_{3}
- Senary: 103_{6}
- Octal: 47_{8}
- Duodecimal: 33_{12}
- Hexadecimal: 27_{16}

39 (thirty-nine) is the natural number following 38 and preceding 40.

== In mathematics ==
The F26A graph has 39 edges, all equivalent.

39 is the 12th distinct semiprime and the 4th in the (3.q) family. It is the last member of the third distinct semiprime pair (38,39). 39 is the sum of five consecutive primes (3 + 5 + 7 + 11 + 13) and also is the product of the first and the last of those consecutive primes. Among small semiprimes only three other integers (10, 155, and 371) share this attribute. 39 also is the sum of the first three powers of 3 (3^{1} + 3^{2} + 3^{3}). 39 is a zero of Mertens function. 39 has an aliquot sum of 17, which is a prime. 39 is the 4th member of the 17-aliquot tree within an aliquot sequence of one composite number (39,17,1,0) to the Prime in the 17-aliquot tree. It is a perfect totient number.

39 is the smallest natural number which has three partitions into three parts which all give the same product when multiplied: {25, 8, 6}, {24, 10, 5}, {20, 15, 4}.

39 is a Perrin number, coming after 17, 22, 29 (it is the sum of the first two mentioned).

Since the greatest prime factor of 39^{2} + 1 = 1522 is 761, which is more than twice 39, 39 is a Størmer number.

The F26A graph is a symmetric graph with 39 edges.

== In other fields ==
=== Arts and entertainment ===
In Japanese wordplay and slang, through numeric substitution, 39 is the Internet chat slang term for "Thank you" when written with numbers: 3 (三, san) and 9 (九, kyū). 39 has also been associated with the virtual singer Hatsune Miku for the same reason: "san" (三, 3) can also be read as "mi" (三), and "kyuu" (九, 9) can also be read as "ku" (九). Thus, if using the alternative readings, 39 (三十九, sanjūkyū) can also be read as 39 (三九, miku). The idea of both readings being tied to Miku originated most likely when used in the name of Miku's first solo concert, Miku no Hi Kanshasai 39's Giving Day, where 39 can be read as "thanks", and so the phrase can be read as "Thanksgiving Day". Ever since then, the "sankyu" reading appeared in numerous songs tied to Miku, like 39 Music! or Antenna 39.

=== History ===
In Afghanistan, the number 39 is considered unlucky, due to the belief that it is associated with pimps.
