= 36 (number) =

← 35	36	37 →
- ← 30 31 32 33 34 35 36 37 38 39 →: List of numbers; Integers; ← 0 10 20 30 40 50 60 70 80 90 →
- Cardinal: thirty-six
- Ordinal: 36th (thirty-sixth)
- Factorization: 2^{2} × 3^{2}
- Divisors: 1, 2, 3, 4, 6, 9, 12, 18, 36
- Greek numeral: ΛϚ´
- Roman numeral: XXXVI, xxxvi
- Binary: 100100_{2}
- Ternary: 1100_{3}
- Senary: 100_{6}
- Octal: 44_{8}
- Duodecimal: 30_{12}
- Hexadecimal: 24_{16}

36 (thirty-six) is the natural number following 35 and preceding 37.

== In mathematics ==
36 depicted as a triangular number and as a square number

36 as the sum of the first positive cubes

36 is both the square of six, and the eighth triangular number or the sum of the first eight non-zero positive integers, which makes 36 the first non-trivial square triangular number. Aside from being the smallest square triangular number other than 1, it is also the only triangular number (other than 1) whose square root is also a triangular number.

36 is also the eighth refactorable number, as it has exactly nine positive divisors, and 9 is one of them; in fact, it is the smallest positive integer with at least nine divisors, which leads 36 to be the 7th highly composite number. It is the sum of the fourth pair of twin-primes (17 + 19), and the 18th Harshad number in decimal, as it is divisible by the sum of its digits (9).

It is the smallest number $n$ with exactly eight solutions (37, 57, 63, 74, 76, 108, 114, 126) to the Euler totient function $\phi(x)=n$. Adding up some subsets of its divisors (e.g., 6, 12, and 18) gives 36; hence, it is also the eighth semiperfect number.

This number is the sum of the cubes of the first three positive integers and also the product of the squares of the first three positive integers.

36 is the number of degrees in the interior angle of each tip of a regular pentagram.

The thirty-six officers problem is a mathematical puzzle with no solution.

The number of possible outcomes (not summed) in the roll of two distinct dice.

36 is the largest numeric base that some computer systems support because it exhausts the numerals, 0–9, and the letters, A-Z. See Base 36.

The truncated cube and the truncated octahedron are Archimedean solids with 36 edges.

The number of domino tilings of a 4×4 checkerboard is 36.

Since it is possible to find sequences of 36 consecutive integers such that each inner member shares a factor with either the first or the last member, 36 is an Erdős–Woods number.

The sum of the integers from 1 to 36 is 666 (see number of the beast).

36 is also a tridecagonal number.

The cosine of an angle of 36 degrees is half the golden ratio. This is equivalent to cos(π/5) and sin(54). The point of the golden triangle is 36 degrees.

== In science ==
- Babylonian astronomers developed a 36 stars system.

== In religion ==
- Jewish tradition holds that the number 36 has had special significance since the beginning of time: According to the Midrash, the light created by God on the first day of creation shone for exactly 36 hours; it was replaced by the light of the Sun that was created on the Fourth Day. The Torah commands 36 times to love, respect and protect the stranger. Furthermore, in every generation there are 36 righteous people (the "Lamed Vav Tzadikim") in whose merit the world continues to exist. In the modern celebration of Hanukkah, 36 candles are kindled in the menorah over the eight days of that holiday (not including the shamash candle).

== In culture ==
- In French-speaking countries, 36 is often used as a placeholder number.

== In other fields ==
- An international calling code for Hungary.
