= 82 (number) =

← 81	82	83 →
- ← 80 81 82 83 84 85 86 87 88 89 →: List of numbers; Integers; ← 0 10 20 30 40 50 60 70 80 90 →
- Cardinal: eighty-two
- Ordinal: 82nd (eighty-second)
- Factorization: 2 × 41
- Divisors: 1, 2, 41, 82
- Greek numeral: ΠΒ´
- Roman numeral: LXXXII, lxxxii
- Binary: 1010010_{2}
- Ternary: 10001_{3}
- Senary: 214_{6}
- Octal: 122_{8}
- Duodecimal: 6A_{12}
- Hexadecimal: 52_{16}

82 (eighty-two) is the natural number following 81 and preceding 83.

== In mathematics ==
82 is a happy number and a companion Pell number. It is palindromic in bases 3 (10001_{3}), 9 (101_{9}) and 40 (22_{40}).

With an aliquot sum of 44, 82 is within an aliquot sequence of four composite numbers (82, 44, 40, 50, 43, 1, 0) to the prime in the 43-aliquot tree.

== In physics ==
82 is the sixth magic number.
