= 31 (number) =

← 30	31	32 →
- ← 30 31 32 33 34 35 36 37 38 39 →: List of numbers; Integers; ← 0 10 20 30 40 50 60 70 80 90 →
- Cardinal: thirty-one
- Ordinal: 31st (thirty-first)
- Factorization: prime
- Prime: 11th
- Divisors: 1, 31
- Greek numeral: ΛΑ´
- Roman numeral: XXXI, xxxi
- Binary: 11111_{2}
- Ternary: 1011_{3}
- Senary: 51_{6}
- Octal: 37_{8}
- Duodecimal: 27_{12}
- Hexadecimal: 1F_{16}

31 (thirty-one) is the natural number following 30 and preceding 32.

== Mathematics ==
31 is a prime number, a twin prime (with 29), a super-prime, a member of an emirp prime pair, a sexy prime, and a Mersenne prime. Since it is a Mersenne prime, it can be expressed as 2^{5} - 1.

31 is a centered triangular number, a centered pentagonal number, and a centered decagonal number.

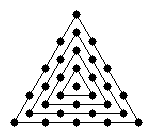

(bottom left)

31 shown as a centered pentagonal, triangular, and decagonal number.

== In other fields ==
31 equal temperament is a popular microtonal tuning for musical instruments because it provides a good approximation of harmonic intervals.

January, March, May, July, August, October and December have 31 days.

== As a meme (Türkiye) ==
In Türkiye, the number 31 is widely recognized in some subcultures as slang for masturbation. Especially among men, it has become a running joke in Turkish humor, online culture, and everyday conversation.

The phrase “31 çekmek” literally translates as “to pull 31,” with çekmek meaning “to pull.” This explanation appears in Turkish slang scholarship and etymological references, and is known and used very commonly by a wide portion of the Turkish society."

It is rumored that this number-slang comes from the Ottoman times, during the Arabic alphabet, used until November 1st, 1928. Allegedly, the digits "3" and "1" were similar in shape to male and female genitalia, causing the 31 meme to spread. However, the etymology is not completely undisputed; alternative explanations have also been proposed, and the exact historical path isn't definitively established.
