= 9 =

Natural number

← 8	9	10 →
- −1 0 1 2 3 4 5 6 7 8 9 →: List of numbers; Integers; ← 0 10 20 30 40 50 60 70 80 90 →
- Cardinal: nine
- Ordinal: 9th (ninth)
- Numeral system: nonary
- Factorization: 3^{2}
- Divisors: 1,3,9
- Greek numeral: Θ´
- Roman numeral: IX, ix
- Greek prefix: ennea-
- Latin prefix: nona-
- Binary: 1001_{2}
- Ternary: 100_{3}
- Senary: 13_{6}
- Octal: 11_{8}
- Duodecimal: 9_{12}
- Hexadecimal: 9_{16}
- Amharic: ፱
- Arabic, Kurdish, Persian, Sindhi, Urdu: ٩
- Armenian numeral: Թ
- Bengali: ৯
- Chinese numeral: 九, 玖
- Devanāgarī: ९
- Santali: ᱙
- Greek numeral: θ´
- Hebrew numeral: ט
- Tamil numerals: ௯
- Khmer: ៩
- Telugu script: ౯
- Thai numeral: ๙
- Malayalam: ൯
- Babylonian numeral: 𒐝
- Egyptian hieroglyph: 𓐂
- Morse code: ____.
- NATO phonetic alphabet: NINER

9 (nine) is the natural number following 8 and preceding 10.

== Evolution of the Hindu–Arabic digit ==

Circa 300 BC, as part of the Brahmi numerals, various Indians wrote a digit 9 similar in shape to the modern closing question mark without the bottom dot. The Kshatrapa, Andhra and Gupta started curving the bottom vertical line coming up with a 3-look-alike. How the numbers got to their Gupta form is open to considerable debate. The Nagari continued the bottom stroke to make a circle and enclose the 3-look-alike, in much the same way that the sign @ encircles a lowercase a. As time went on, the enclosing circle became bigger and its line continued beyond the circle downwards, as the 3-look-alike became smaller. Soon, all that was left of the 3-look-alike was a squiggle. The Arabs simply connected that squiggle to the downward stroke at the middle and subsequent European change was purely cosmetic.

While the shape of the glyph for the digit 9 has an ascender in most modern typefaces, in typefaces with text figures the character usually has a descender, as, for example, in.

The form of could possibly derive from the Arabic letter waw, which in its isolated form (و) resembles the number 9.

The modern digit resembles an inverted 6. To disambiguate the two on objects and labels that can be inverted, they are often underlined. It is sometimes handwritten with two strokes and a straight stem, resembling a raised lower-case letter q, which distinguishes it from the 6. Similarly, in seven-segment display, the number 9 can be constructed either with a hook at the end of its stem or without one. Most LCD calculators use the former, but some VFD models use the latter.

== Mathematics ==
9 is the fourth composite number, the first odd composite number, a square, a Motzkin number, and the number of derangements of 4 items.

In the decimal system, 9 is the largest possible digital root.

Casting out nines is a quick way of testing the calculations of sums, differences, products, and quotients of integers in decimal, a method known as long ago as the 12th century. A decimal integer is divisible by 9 if and only if the sum of its digits is divisible by 9.

9 is the only square number that is the sum of two consecutive, positive cubes: $3^2 = 9 = 1^3 + 2^3$

If an odd perfect number exists, it will have at least nine distinct prime factors.

9 is a Motzkin number: it counts the ways of drawing non-intersecting chords among four points on a circle, allowing some points to remain unmatched.

9 is the sum of the cubes of the first two non-zero positive integers $1^{3} + 2^{3}$ which makes it the first cube-sum number greater than one. A number that is 4 or 5 modulo 9 cannot be represented as the sum of three cubes.

Four concentric magic circles with 9 in the center (by Yang Hui), where numbers on each circle and diameter around the center generate a magic sum of 138.

There are nine Heegner numbers, or square-free positive integers $n$ that yield an imaginary quadratic field $\Q\left[\sqrt{-n}\right]$ whose ring of integers has a unique factorization, or class number of 1.

9 is the largest single-digit number in the decimal system.

The "nine dots" puzzle. The puzzle asks to link all nine dots using four straight lines or fewer, without lifting the pen.

The nine dots puzzle is a mathematical puzzle whose task is to connect nine squarely arranged points with a pen by four (or fewer) straight lines without lifting the pen or retracing any lines.

=== Geometry ===
A polygon with nine sides is called an nonagon or occasionally, an enneagon. A regular nonagon can be constructed with a regular compass, straightedge, and angle trisector.

The lowest number of squares needed for a perfect tiling of a rectangle is 9.

=== List of basic calculations ===
Multiplication	1	2	3	4	5	6	7	8	9	10	11	12	13	14	15	16	20	25	50	100	1000
9 × x	9	18	27	36	45	54	63	72	81	90	99	108	117	126	135	144	180	225	450	900	9000

Division	1	2	3	4	5	6	7	8	9	10	11	12	13	14	15
9 ÷ x	9	4.5	3	2.25	1.8	1.5	1.2̅8̅5̅7̅1̅4̅	1.125	1	0.9	0.8̅1̅	0.75	0.6̅9̅2̅3̅0̅7̅	0.64̅2̅8̅5̅7̅1̅	0.6
x ÷ 9	0.1̅	0.2̅	0.3̅	0.4̅	0.5̅	0.6̅	0.7̅	0.8̅	1	1.1̅	1.2̅	1.3̅	1.4̅	1.5̅	1.6̅

Exponentiation	1	2	3	4	5	6	7	8	9	10
9^{x}	9	81	729	6561	59049	531441	4782969	43046721	387420489	3486784401
x^{9}	1	512	19683	262144	1953125	10077696	40353607	134217728	387420489	1000000000

== Culture and mythology ==
Ne Win, the leader of Myanmar from 1962 to 1988, was a very superstitious man. In 1987, he reissued banknotes of Myanmar's currency, the kyat, in denominations of 45 and 90 kyats on advice from an astrologer who informed him that 9 was his lucky number.

=== Indian culture ===
Nine is a number that appears often in Indian culture and mythology. For example, there are nine influencers attested to in Indian astrology. In the Vaisheshika branch of Hindu philosophy, there are nine universal substances or elements: Earth, Water, Air, Fire, Ether, Time, Space, Soul, and Mind. Navaratri is a nine-day festival dedicated to the nine forms of Durga.

=== Chinese culture ===
- Nine (九; pinyin: jiǔ) is considered a good number in Chinese culture because it sounds the same as the word "long-lasting" (久; pinyin: jiǔ).
- Nine is strongly associated with the Chinese dragon, a symbol of magic and power. There are nine forms of the dragon, it is described in terms of nine attributes, and it has nine children. It has 117 scales – 81 yang (masculine, heavenly) and 36 yin (feminine, earthly). All three numbers are multiples of 9.

== Anthropology ==
=== Idioms ===
- To "go the whole nine yards" is to do something fully, despite any difficulty
- To be "dressed to the nines" is to be as well dressed as possible
- To be "on cloud nine" is to be in a state of complete bliss
- Cats are said to have "nine lives", describing their ability to avoid or survive dangers
- "A stitch in time saves nine", describing the greater ease of preparation and prevention as compared with repair or recovery
- "K-9" is pronounced nearly identically to canine and is used in many US police departments to denote the police dog unit. Despite the terms not being homophonous in other languages, many police and military units around the world borrow the same designation from English.

International maritime signal flag for 9

== Religion and philosophy ==

- Nine, as the largest single-digit number (in base ten), symbolizes completeness in the Baháʼí Faith. In addition, the word Baháʼ in the Abjad notation has a value of 9, and a 9-pointed star is used to symbolize the religion.
- The number 9 is revered in Hinduism and considered a complete, perfected and divine number because it represents the end of a cycle in the decimal system, which originated from the Indian subcontinent as early as 3000 BC.
- In Norse mythology, the number nine is associated with Odin, as that is how many days he hung from the world tree Yggdrasil before attaining knowledge of the runes.
- Nine is the number associated with Satan in LaVeyan Satanism. Anton LaVey wrote in The Satanic Rituals that this is because nine is the number of the ego since it "always returns to itself" even after being multiplied by any number.

== Science ==
=== Chemistry ===
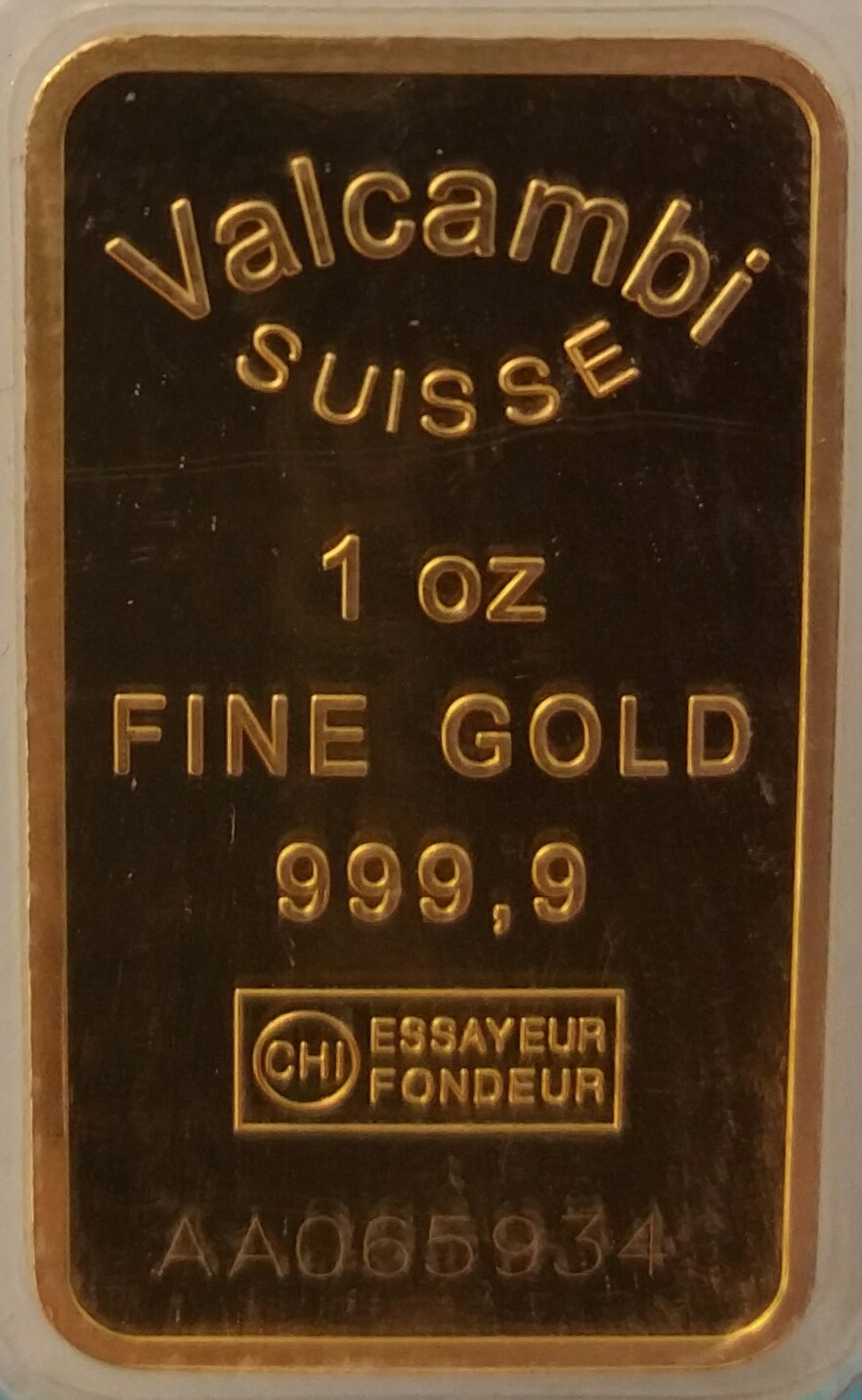
Gold bullion with four nines denoting 99.99% purity; a decimal comma is used here

Nines are a notation for expressing the purity of a chemical.

In chemical nomenclature, the prefix "non-" stands for the number nine, for example in molecular chains with nine atoms such as "nonane" for an alkane with nine carbon atoms. The prefixes play a role in the naming of molecules, especially in organic chemistry to indicate the number of similar atoms or groups in the molecule (e.g. "nonan" for 9 carbon atoms, "nonavalent" for nine-valent. Nonapeptides are peptides that consist of nine amino acids.

=== Psychology ===
9 is a common terminal digit in psychological pricing.

== See also ==
- 9 (disambiguation)
- 0.999...
- Cloud Nine
