= Dodecahedral number =

Figurate number representing a dodecahedron

In mathematics, a dodecahedral number is a figurate number that represents a dodecahedron. The nth dodecahedral number is given by the formula

${n(3n-1)(3n-2) \over 2}={3n \choose 3}$

The first such numbers are: 0, 1, 20, 84, 220, 455, 816, 1330, 2024, 2925, 4060, 5456, 7140, 9139, 11480, ... (sequence A006566 in the OEIS).

== History ==
The first study of dodecahedral numbers appears to have been by René Descartes, around 1630, in his De solidorum elementis. Prior to Descartes, figurate numbers had been studied by the ancient Greeks and by Johann Faulhaber, but only for polygonal numbers, pyramidal numbers, and cubes. Descartes introduced the study of figurate numbers based on the Platonic solids and some semiregular polyhedra; his work included the dodecahedral numbers. However, De solidorum elementis was lost, and not rediscovered until 1860. In the meantime, dodecahedral numbers had been studied again by other mathematicians, including Friedrich Wilhelm Marpurg in 1774, Georg Simon Klügel in 1808, and Sir Frederick Pollock in 1850.

== Properties ==
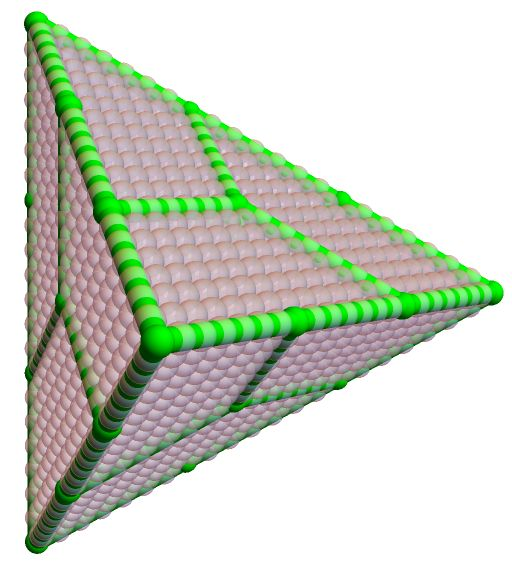
The (3n+1) tetrahedral number is also the (n+1) dodecahedral one.

The (3n+1)th tetrahedral number is also the (n+1)th dodecahedral number. Illustrated is a geometrical rendering of this equality. When the triangular faces of the tetrahedron are divided into congruent trapezoids, the result is a dodecahedral graph; with the figurate number array for the (3n+1)th tetrahedral number each edge of the dodecahedral graph fall along (n+1) unit balls.

== Generating Function ==
The ordinary generating function of the Dodecahedral numbers is

$$\frac{x(1 + 16 x + 10 x^2)}{(-1 + x)^4}$$
