= 88 (number) =

← 87	88	89 →
- ← 80 81 82 83 84 85 86 87 88 89 →: List of numbers; Integers; ← 0 10 20 30 40 50 60 70 80 90 →
- Cardinal: eighty-eight
- Ordinal: 88th (eighty-eighth)
- Factorization: 2^{3} × 11
- Divisors: 1, 2, 4, 8, 11, 22, 44, 88
- Greek numeral: ΠΗ´
- Roman numeral: LXXXVIII, lxxxviii
- Binary: 1011000_{2}
- Ternary: 10021_{3}
- Senary: 224_{6}
- Octal: 130_{8}
- Duodecimal: 74_{12}
- Hexadecimal: 58_{16}

88 (eighty-eight) is the natural number following 87 and preceding 89.

== In mathematics ==
88 is:

- a refactorable number.
- a primitive semiperfect number.
- an untouchable number.
- a hexadecagonal number.
- an Erdős–Woods number, since it is possible to find sequences of 88 consecutive integers such that each inner member shares a factor with either the first or the last member.
- a palindromic number in bases 5 (323_{5}), 10 (88_{10}), 21 (44_{21}), and 43 (22_{43}).
- a repdigit in bases 10, 21 and 43.
- a 2-automorphic number.
- the smallest positive integer with a Zeckendorf representation requiring 5 Fibonacci numbers.
- a strobogrammatic number.
- the largest number in English not containing the letter 'n' in its name, when using short scale.

88 and 945 are the smallest coprime abundant numbers, since all abundant numbers less than 945 are multiples of 2, 945 has 3, 5 and 7 as divisors, and 88 is the first abundant number that doesn't have 3, 5 or 7 as divisors.

== Cultural significance ==
=== In Chinese culture ===
88 symbolizes fortune and good luck in Chinese culture, since the word 8 sounds similar to the word fā (發, which implies 發財, or wealth, in Mandarin or Cantonese). The number 8 is considered to be the luckiest number in Chinese culture, and prices in Chinese supermarkets often contain many 8s. The shape of the Chinese character for 8 (八) implies that a person will have a great, wide future as the character starts narrow and gets wider toward the bottom. The Chinese government has been auctioning auto license plates containing many 8s for tens of thousands of dollars. The 2008 Beijing Olympics opened at 8 p.m., 8 August 2008.

In addition, 88 is also used to mean "bye bye (拜拜)" in Chinese-language chats, text messages, SMSs and IMs, because its pronunciation in Mandarin is similar to "bye bye".

=== In amateur radio ===
In amateur radio, 88 is used as shorthand for "love and kisses" when signing a message or ending an exchange. It is used in spoken word (radiotelephony), Morse code (radiotelegraphy), and in various digital modes. It is considered rather more intimate than "73", which means "best regards"; therefore 73 is more often used. The two may be used together. Sometimes either expression is pluralized by appending an -s. These number codes originate with the 92 Code adopted by Western Union in 1859.

=== In neo-Nazism ===
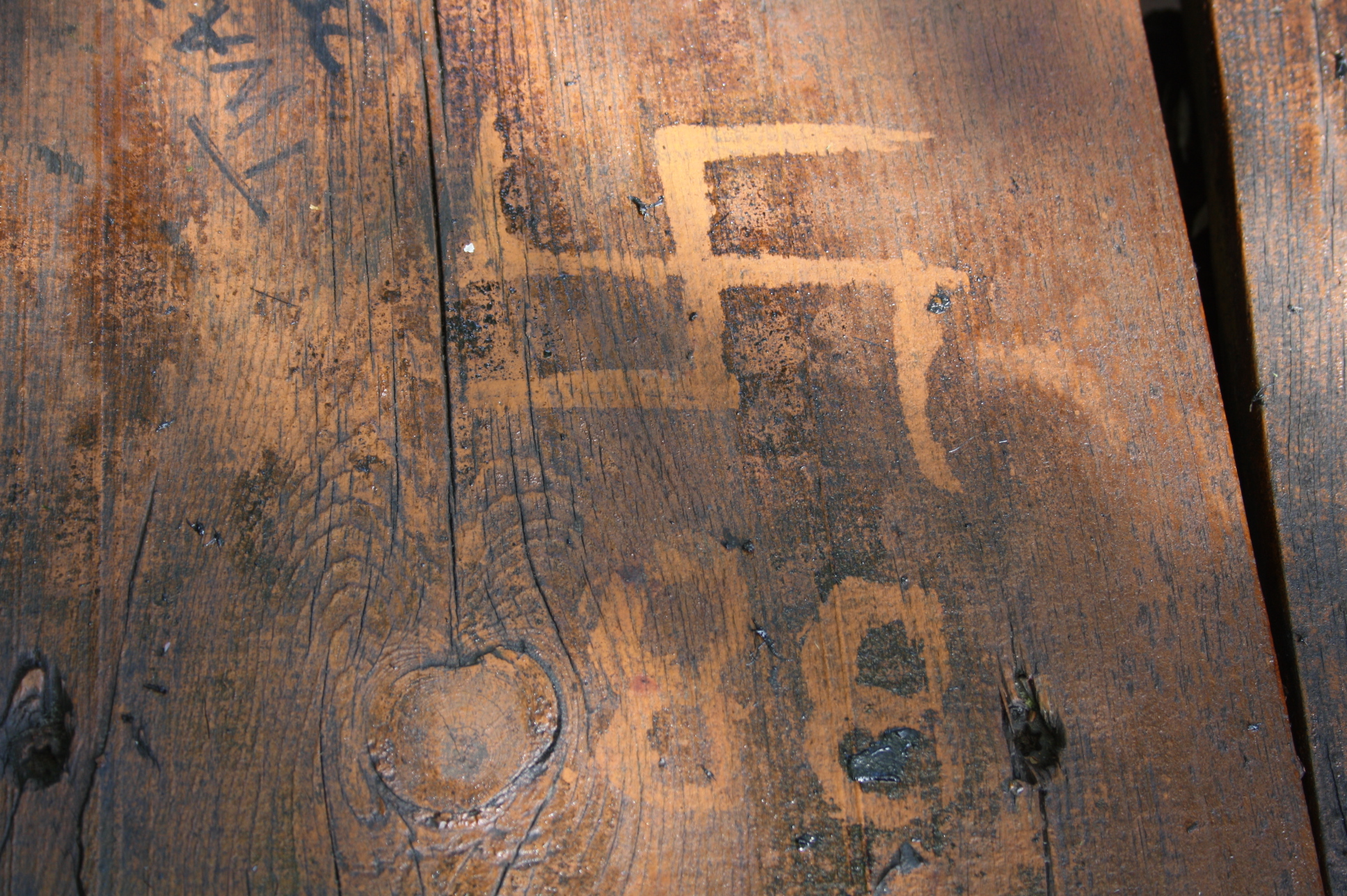
Nazi graffiti with the number 88

Neo-Nazis use the number 88 as an abbreviation for the Nazi salute Heil Hitler. The letter H is eighth in many European Latin alphabets, whereby 88 becomes HH.

Often, this number is associated with the number 14, e.g. 14/88, 14-88, or 1488; this number symbolizes the Fourteen Words and 88 Precepts coined by David Lane, a prominent white supremacist. Example uses of 88 include the song "88 Rock 'n' Roll Band" by Landser, and the organizations Column 88 and Unit 88.

The number is banned on Austrian license plates due to its association with "Heil Hitler [and] where H comes in the alphabet". In June 2023, the Italian Football Federation (FIGC) and the Italian government announced that the number 88 would be banned from use in Italian association football, as part of a joint initiative to combat antisemitism. This followed an incident in March of that year in which a Lazio supporter wore a club shirt bearing the name "Hitlerson" and the number 88, which led to the supporter receiving a lifetime ban from attending Lazio matches.

In the United States, former FBI assistant director of counterintelligence Frank Figliuzzi declared in 2019 that something as innocuous as raising a flag on the White House to full staff on 8 August (i.e. 8–8) is a "messaging" problem because "the numbers 88 are very significant in neo-Nazi and white supremacy movement."

== In other fields ==
88 could also refer to the following:

- In the Back to the Future films, 88 miles per hour is the speed that Doctor Emmett Brown's DeLorean car had to reach in order to attain time travel.
- The Junkers Ju 88 multirole combat aircraft used during WWII.
- In music, '88s' is slang for a piano, as a standard keyboard has 88 keys.
- The International Astronomical Union lists 88 named constellations.
- Mercury's orbital period is 88 Earth-days
