= The Whetstone of Witte =

Book by Robert Recorde

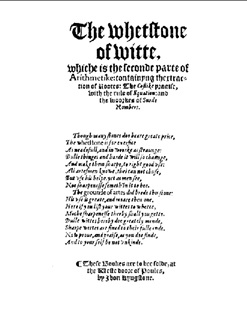
- Author: Robert Recorde
- Genre: Mathematics
- Publication date: 1557

The Whetstone of Witte is the shortened title of Robert Recorde's mathematics book published in 1557, the full title being The whetstone of witte, whiche is the seconde parte of Arithmetike: containyng thextraction of Rootes: The Coßike practise, with the rule of Equation: and the woorkes of Surde Nombers. The book covers topics including whole numbers, the extraction of roots and irrational numbers. The work is notable for containing the first recorded use of the equals sign and also for being the first book in English to use the plus and minus signs.

Recordian notation for exponentiation, however, differed from the later Cartesian notation $p^q = p \times p \times p \cdots \times p$. Recorde expressed indices and surds larger than 3 in a systematic form based on the prime factorization of the exponent: a factor of two he termed a zenzic, and a factor of three, a cubic. Recorde termed the larger prime numbers appearing in this factorization sursolids, distinguishing between them by use of ordinal numbers: that is, he defined 5 as the first sursolid, written as ʃz and 7 as the second sursolid, written as Bʃz.

He also devised symbols for these factors: a zenzic was denoted by z, and a cubic by &. For instance, he referred to p^{8}=p^{2×2×2} as zzz (the zenzizenzizenzic), and q^{12}=q^{2×2×3} as zz& (the zenzizenzicubic).

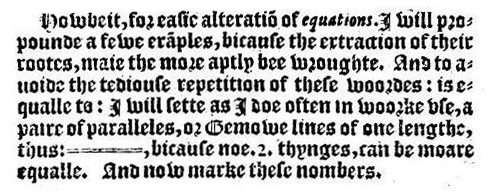
The passage in The Whetstone of Witte introducing the equals sign

Later in the book he includes a chart of exponents all the way up to p^{80}=p^{2×2×2×2×5} written as zzzzʃz. There is an error in the chart, however, writing p^{69} as Sʃz, despite it not being a prime. It should be p^{3×23} or &Gʃz.

Page images have been made available by Victor Katz and Frank Swetz through Convergence, a publication of Mathematical Association of America.
