= 84 (number) =

← 83	84	85 →
- ← 80 81 82 83 84 85 86 87 88 89 →: List of numbers; Integers; ← 0 10 20 30 40 50 60 70 80 90 →
- Cardinal: eighty-four
- Ordinal: 84th (eighty-fourth)
- Factorization: 2^{2} × 3 × 7
- Divisors: 1, 2, 3, 4, 6, 7, 12, 14, 21, 28, 42, 84 (12)
- Greek numeral: ΠΔ´
- Roman numeral: LXXXIV, lxxxiv
- Binary: 1010100_{2}
- Ternary: 10010_{3}
- Senary: 220_{6}
- Octal: 124_{8}
- Duodecimal: 70_{12}
- Hexadecimal: 54_{16}

84 (eighty-four) is the natural number following 83 and preceding 85.

== In mathematics ==
A hepteract is a seven-dimensional hypercube with 84 penteract 5-faces.

84 is a semiperfect number, being a multiple of a perfect number. It is the number of four-digit perfect powers in decimal.

It is the third dodecahedral number, and the sum of the first seven triangular numbers (1, 3, 6, 10, 15, 21, 28), which makes it the seventh tetrahedral number.

The number of divisors of 84 is 12. As no smaller number has more than 12 divisors, 84 is a largely composite number.

A hepteract is a seven-dimensional hypercube with 84 penteract 5-faces.

84 is the limit superior of the largest finite subgroup of the mapping class group of a genus $g$ surface divided by $g$.

Under Hurwitz's automorphisms theorem, a smooth connected Riemann surface $X$ of genus $g > 1$ will contain an automorphism group $\mathrm{Aut}(X) = G$ whose order is classically bound to $|G| \le 84 \text { } (g - 1)$.

84 is the thirtieth and largest $n$ for which the cyclotomic field $\mathrm {Q}(\zeta_{n})$ has class number $1$ (or unique factorization), preceding 60 (that is the composite index of 84), and 48.

There are 84 zero divisors in the 16-dimensional sedenions $\mathbb S$.
