= Six degrees =

Six degrees of separation is the theory that anyone on Earth can be connected to any other person on the planet through a chain of acquaintances that has no more than five intermediaries

Six degrees or Six degrees of separation may also refer to:

- Six degrees of freedom, motion in three-dimensional space, with three translation motions (up/down, left/right, forward/back) and three rotation motions (yaw, pitch, roll)
- Six Degrees of Kevin Bacon, a trivia game that requires a group of players to connect any film actor to Kevin Bacon in as few links as possible
  - SixDegrees.org, a social networking website created by Bacon based on the game, intended to link people to charities
- SixDegrees.com, a social networking website from 1997 to 2001
- Six Degrees patent, covering patterns on which modern social networking is founded
- Six Degrees Architects, an Australian architectural firm in Melbourne, Victoria

== Books ==
- Six Degrees: The Science of a Connected Age, a science book by Duncan J. Watts, covering the application of network theory to sociology
- Six Degrees: Our Future on a Hotter Planet, 2007 book by Mark Lynas, about the impact each single degree increase in temperature could have on our planet over the next century
- SixDegrees (magazine), English-language Finnish magazine

== Film, television, and drama ==
- Six Degrees (TV series), aka 6°, a 2006 American television series that aired on ABC
- 6Degrees, aka Six Degrees, a 2012–2015 British/Northern Irish television series that aired on BBC-NI
- Six Degrees of Separation (play), a play by American playwright John Guare
- Six Degrees of Separation (film), a 1993 American film adaptation of the Guare play
- "Six Degrees of Separation" (Battlestar Galactica), an episode of the television series Battlestar Galactica
- Six Degrees of Separation from Lilia Cuntapay, a Philippine independent film
- Lonely Planet Six Degrees, an American travel television program

== Music ==
- "Six Degrees of Separation" (song), a song by Irish rock band The Script from their album #3
- Six Degrees of Inner Turbulence, a full-length studio album by progressive metal band Dream Theater
- "Six Degrees of Inner Turbulence" (song), the title track of the aforementioned album
- Six Degrees Records, a recording company noted for its catalog of recordings from international musicians and vocalists
