= Semiperfect number =

Number equal to the sum of all or some of its divisors

- Demonstration, with Cuisenaire rods, of the perfection of the number 6.
- Total no. of terms: infinity
- First terms: 6, 12, 18, 20, 24, 28, 30
- OEIS index: A005835; Pseudoperfect (or semiperfect) numbers

In number theory, a semiperfect number or pseudoperfect number is a natural number n equal to the sum of all or some of its proper divisors. A semiperfect number equal to the sum of all its proper divisors is a perfect number.

The first few semiperfect numbers are: 6, 12, 18, 20, 24, 28, 30, 36, 40, ... (sequence A005835 in the OEIS)

== Properties ==
- Every multiple of a semiperfect number is semiperfect. A semiperfect number not divisible by any smaller semiperfect number is called primitive.
- Every number of the form 2^{m}p for a natural number m and an odd prime number p such that p < 2^{m+1} is also semiperfect.
  - In particular, every number of the form 2^{m}(2^{m+1} − 1) is semiperfect, and is indeed perfect if 2^{m+1} − 1 is a Mersenne prime.
- The smallest odd semiperfect number is 945.
- A semiperfect number is necessarily either perfect or abundant. An abundant number that is not semiperfect is called a weird number.
- Except for 2, all primary pseudoperfect numbers are semiperfect.
- Every practical number that is not a power of two is semiperfect.
- The natural density of the set of semiperfect numbers exists.

== Primitive semiperfect numbers ==
A primitive semiperfect number (also called a primitive pseudoperfect number, irreducible semiperfect number or irreducible pseudoperfect number) is a semiperfect number that has no semiperfect proper divisor.

The first few primitive semiperfect numbers are 6, 20, 28, 88, 104, 272, 304, 350, ... (sequence A006036 in the OEIS). The sums for those numbers are:

- 1 + 2 + 3 = 6
- 1 + 4 + 5 + 10 = 20
- 1 + 2 + 4 + 7 + 14 = 28
- 1 + 2 + 8 + 11 + 22 + 44 = 88
- 1 + 4 + 8 + 13 + 26 + 52 = 104
- 1 + 16 + 17 + 34 + 68 + 136 = 272
- 1 + 2 + 16 + 19 + 38 + 76 + 152 = 304
- 1 + 5 + 10 + 14 + 25 + 50 + 70 + 175 = 350

There are infinitely many such numbers. All numbers of the form 2^{m}p, with p a prime between 2^{m} and 2^{m+1}, are primitive semiperfect, but not all primitive semiperfect numbers follow this form; for example, 770. There are infinitely many odd primitive semiperfect numbers, the smallest being 945. There are infinitely many primitive semiperfect numbers that are not harmonic divisor numbers.

Every semiperfect number is a multiple of a primitive semiperfect number.

== See also ==
- Hemiperfect number
- Erdős–Nicolas number
