= Hellin's law =

Hellin's law, also called Hellin-Zeleny's law, is an empirical observation in demography that the approximate rate of multiple births is one n-tuple birth per 89^{n-1} singleton births: twin births occur about once per 89 singleton births, triplets about once per 89^{2}, quadruplets about once per 89^{3}, and so on.

== Origin ==
Throughout the 1800s, demographics registers were becoming more common in Europe, which generated data sets in different administrative regions. There was interest in twin research, and many demographers began studying patterns in birth rates. Analysis by Veit in 1855 of a Prussian data set covering 1826 to 1849 showed the numbers of twin, triplet, and quadruplet maternities were respectively one for every 89, 7910, and 371126 single maternities. Paul Strassmann analyzed the same data in 1889 and noted the rates of twin and triplet maternities were approximately one per 89 and 89^{2}, and in 1895 Hellin gave the law a general form. In 1921, Charles Zeleny further analyzed the data and posited that since the rates of multiple maternities can simply be multiplied together, then they were the result of independent processes that occurred with equal frequencies.
