= 33 (number) =

← 32	33	34 →
- ← 30 31 32 33 34 35 36 37 38 39 →: List of numbers; Integers; ← 0 10 20 30 40 50 60 70 80 90 →
- Cardinal: thirty-three
- Ordinal: 33rd (thirty-third)
- Factorization: 3 × 11
- Divisors: 1, 3, 11, 33
- Greek numeral: ΛΓ´
- Roman numeral: XXXIII, xxxiii
- Binary: 100001_{2}
- Ternary: 1020_{3}
- Senary: 53_{6}
- Octal: 41_{8}
- Duodecimal: 29_{12}
- Hexadecimal: 21_{16}

33 (thirty-three) is the natural number following 32 and preceding 34.

== In mathematics ==
33 is a composite number.

33 was the second to last number less than 100 whose representation as a sum of three cubes was found (in 2019):
$$33 = 8866128975287528 ^{3} + (-8778405442862239)^{3} + (-2736111468807040)^{3}.$$
33 is the last of seven numbers in the positive definite quadratic integer matrix representative of all odd numbers: {1, 3, 5, 7, 11, 15, 33}, also known as numbers from Bhargava's 33 theorem.

33 is the largest of only six numbers that are not sum of distinct triangular numbers (sequence A053614 in the OEIS).

== In religion and mythology ==
- Islamic prayer beads are generally arranged in sets of 33, corresponding to the widespread use of this number in dhikr rituals. Such beads may number 33 in total or three distinct sets of 33 for a total of 99, corresponding to the names of God.
- 33 is a master number in New Age numerology, along with 11 and 22.
- Jesus Christ is thought to have been 33 years of age when he was crucified on Golgotha, outside Jerusalem.
- 33 is the highest degree of Freemasonry.

== Other cultural references ==
- "33" appears on every bottle of Rolling Rock beer. No definitive meaning has been identified, though theories include that is the year of Prohibition ending in the US and the number of letters in quality statement also printed on the bottle. The company website states 'nobody knows' the reason, but lists several popular theories.
