= Unitary divisor =

Certain type of divisor of an integer

In mathematics, a natural number a is a unitary divisor (or Hall divisor) of a number b if a is a divisor of b and if a and b / a are coprime, having no common factor other than 1. Equivalently, a divisor a of b is a unitary divisor if and only if every prime factor of a has the same multiplicity in a as it has in b.

The concept of a unitary divisor originates from R. Vaidyanathaswamy (1931), who used the term block divisor.

== Example ==
The integer 5 is a unitary divisor of 60, because 5 and $\frac{60}{5}=12$ have only 1 as a common factor.

On the contrary, 6 is a divisor but not a unitary divisor of 60, as 6 and $\frac{60}{6}=10$ have a common factor other than 1, namely 2.

== Sum of unitary divisors ==
The sum-of-unitary-divisors function is denoted by the lowercase Greek letter sigma thus: $\sigma^*(n)$. The sum of the k-th powers of the unitary divisors is denoted by $\sigma_k^*(n)$:

$$\sigma_k^*(n) = \sum_{d \,\mid\, n \atop \gcd(d,\,n/d)=1} \!\! d^k.$$

It is a multiplicative function. If the proper unitary divisors of a given number add up to that number, then that number is called a unitary perfect number.

== Properties ==
The number 1 is a unitary divisor of every natural number.

The number of unitary divisors of a number n is 2^{k}, where k is the number of distinct prime factors of n. This is because each integer N > 1 is the product of positive powers $p^{r_p}$ of distinct prime numbers p. Thus every unitary divisor of N is the product, over a given subset S of the prime divisors {p} of N, of the prime powers $p^{r_p}$ for p ∈ S. If there are k prime factors, then there are exactly 2^{k} subsets S, and the statement follows.

The sum of the unitary divisors of n is odd if n is a power of 2 (including 1), and even otherwise.

Both the count and the sum of the unitary divisors of n are multiplicative functions of n that are not completely multiplicative. The Dirichlet generating function is

$$\frac{\zeta(s)\zeta(s-k)}{\zeta(2s-k)} = \sum_{n\ge 1}\frac{\sigma_k^*(n)}{n^s}.$$

Every divisor of n is unitary if and only if n is square-free.

The set of all unitary divisors of n forms a Boolean algebra with meet given by the greatest common divisor and join by the least common multiple. Equivalently, the set of unitary divisors of n forms a Boolean ring, where the addition and multiplication are given by

$$a\oplus b = \frac{ab}{(a,b)^2},\qquad a\odot b=(a,b)$$

where $(a,b)$ denotes the greatest common divisor of a and b.

== Odd unitary divisors ==
The sum of the k-th powers of the odd unitary divisors is

$$\sigma_k^{(o)*}(n) = \sum_{{d \,\mid\, n \atop d \equiv 1 \pmod 2} \atop \gcd(d,n/d)=1} \!\! d^k.$$

It is also multiplicative, with Dirichlet generating function

$$\frac{\zeta(s)\zeta(s-k)(1-2^{k-s})}{\zeta(2s-k)(1-2^{k-2s})} = \sum_{n\ge 1}\frac{\sigma_k^{(o)*}(n)}{n^s}.$$

== Bi-unitary divisors ==
A divisor d of n is a bi-unitary divisor if the greatest common unitary divisor of d and n / d is 1. This concept originates from D. Suryanarayana (1972). [The number of bi-unitary divisors of an integer, in The Theory of Arithmetic Functions, Lecture Notes in Mathematics 251: 273–282, New York, Springer–Verlag].

The number of bi-unitary divisors of n is a multiplicative function of n with average order $A \log x$ where

$$A = \prod_p\left({1 - \frac{p-1}{p^2(p+1)} }\right) \ = 0.8073308216\cdots  .$$

A bi-unitary perfect number is one equal to the sum of its bi-unitary aliquot divisors. The only such numbers are 6, 60 and 90.

== OEIS sequences ==
- OEIS: A034444 is $\sigma^*_0(n)$
- OEIS: A034448 is $\sigma^*_1(n)$
- OEIS: A034676 to OEIS: A034682 are $\sigma^*_2(n)$ to $\sigma^*_8(n)$
- OEIS: A034444 is $2^\omega(n)$, the number of unitary divisors
- OEIS: A068068 is $\sigma^{(o)*}_0(n)$
- OEIS: A192066 is $\sigma^{(o)*}_1(n)$
- OEIS: A064609 is $\sum_{i=1}^{n}\sigma^*_{1}(i)$
- OEIS: A306071 is the constant A
