= Hindustani numerals =

Numeral system of the Hindustani language

Like many Indo-Aryan languages, Hindustani (Hindi and Urdu) has a decimal numeral system that is contracted to the extent that nearly every number 1–99 is irregular and needs to be memorised as a separate numeral.

== 1-99 ==
The numbers 1-99 largely evolved directly from the Sanskrit forms without being borrowed, and so are nearly all irregular.

For the number 0, Modern Standard Hindi tends to use śūnya (a Sanskrit tatsama) while Standard Urdu prefers sifr (borrowed from Arabic), though the native tadbhava-form is sunnā in Hindustani. Sometimes the ardha-tatsama form śūn is also used (semi-learned borrowing).

	−1	+0	+1	+2	+3	+4	+5	+6	+7	+8	+9
+0		śūnya, sifr, sunnā, śūn	ek	do	tīn	cār	pāṅc	chaḥ	sāt	āṭh	nau
+10		das	gyārah	bārah	terah	caudah	pandrah	solah	satrah	aṭhārah	
+20	unnīs	bīs	ikkīs	bāīs	teīs	caubīs	paccīs	chabbīs	sattāīs	aṭṭhāīs	
+30	untīs	tīs	ikattīs	battīs	taiṅtīs	cauṅtīs	paiṅtīs	chattīs	saiṅtīs	aṛtīs	
+40	untālīs	cālīs	iktālīs	bayālīs	taiṅtālīs	cavālīs	paiṅtālīs	chiyālīs	saiṅtālīs	aṛtālīs	
+50	uncās	pacās	ikyāvan, ikāvan	bāvan	tirpan	cauvan	pacpan	chappan	sattāvan	aṭṭhāvan	
+60	unsaṭh	sāṭh	iksaṭh	bāsaṭh	tirsaṭh	cauṅsaṭh	paiṅsaṭh	chiyāsaṭh	saṛsaṭh	aṛsaṭh	
+70	unhattar	sattar	ikhattar	bahattar	tihattar	cauhattar	pac'hattar	chihattar	sat'hattar	aṭhhattar	
+80	unāsī	assī	ikyāsī, ikāsī	bayāsī	tirāsī	caurāsī	pacāsī	chiyāsī	sattāsi	aṭṭhāsī	navāsī
+90		nabbe, navve	ikyānve, ikānve	bānve, bayānve	tirānve	caurānve	pacānve	chiyānve	sattānve	aṭṭhānve	ninyānve

== 100-10^{18} ==
After 100, the numerals repeat regularly as in any base system. Lakh and crore are common enough to have entered Indian English.

English	Number	Forms of various names		
English	Number	Base	das _	_ karōṛ
Hundred	10^{2}	sau		
Thousand	10^{3}	hazār		
Ten〃	10^{4}		das hazār	
Hundred〃	10^{5}	lākh		
Million	10^{6}		das lākh	
Ten〃	10^{7}	karoṛ		
Hundred〃	10^{8}		das karōṛ	das karōṛ
Billion	10^{9}	arb		sau karōṛ
Ten〃	10^{10}		das arb	ēk hazār karōṛ
Hundred〃	10^{11}	kharab		
Trillion	10^{12}		das kharab	ēk lākh karōṛ
Ten〃	10^{13}	nīl		
Hundred〃	10^{14}		das nīl	ēk karōṛ karōṛ
Quadrillion	10^{15}	padma		
Ten〃	10^{16}		das padma	
Hundred〃	10^{17}	śaṅkh		
Quintillion	10^{18}	gulśan	das śaṅkh	

== Written forms ==
In writing Hindi, numbers are usually represented using Devanagari numeral signs, while in Urdu the signs employed are those of a modified Eastern Arabic numeral system.

Arabic	0	1	2	3	4	5	6	7	8	9
Hindi	०	१	२	३	४	५	६	७	८	९
Urdu	۰	۱	۲	۳	۴	۵	۶	۷	۸	۹
