= Malayalam numerals =

System in Kerala, India

Malayalam numerals are the numeral system of the Malayalam script, primarily used in Kerala. It is one of several Indian numeral systems. This system is archaic and nowadays the Hindu–Arabic numeral system is used commonly. However, it is still found in many documents of cultural or historical importance.

== Base numbers ==
Below is a list of Malayalam numerals with their Hindu–Arabic equivalents as well as their respective Malayalam translations and transliterations.

Malayalam numeral	Hindu–Arabic numeral	Malayalam word	Romanization of Malayalam	IPA
൦	0	പൂജ്യം	pūjyaṁ	/pu:d͡ʒjɐm/
൧	1	ഒന്ന്	onnŭ	/on̪n̪ɨ̆/
൨	2	രണ്ട്	raṇḍŭ	/ɾɐɳɖɨ̆/
൩	3	മൂന്ന്	mūnnŭ	/mu:n̪n̪ɨ̆/
൪	4	നാല്	nālŭ	/n̪ɐ:lɨ̆/
൫	5	അഞ്ച്	añjŭ	/ɐɲd͡ʒɨ̆/
൬	6	ആറ്	āṟŭ	/ɐ:rɨ̆/
൭	7	ഏഴ്	ēḻŭ	/e:ɻɨ̆/
൮	8	എട്ട്	eṭṭŭ	/eʈʈɨ̆/
൯	9	ഒമ്പത്	ombadŭ	/ombɐd̪ɨ̆/
൰/൧൦	10	പത്ത്	pattŭ	/pɐt̪t̪ɨ̆/
൱/൧൦൦	100	നൂറ്	nūṟŭ	/n̪u:rɨ̆/
൲/൧൦൦൦	1000	ആയിരം	āyiraṁ	/ɐ:jiɾɐm/
൳	1/4	കാൽ	kāl	/kɐ:l/
൴	1/2	അര	ara	/ɐɾɐ/
൵	3/4	മുക്കാൽ	mukkāl	/mukkɐ:l/
൷	1/8	അരക്കാൽ	arakkāl	/ɐɾɐkkɐːl/

Originally, a number like "11" would have been written as "൰൧" and not "൧൧" to match the Malayalam word for 11 and "10,00,000" as "൰൱൲" similar to the Tamil numeral system. Later on this system got reformed to be more similar to the Hindu–Arabic numerals so 1,000,000 in the reformed numerals it would be ൧൦൦൦൦൦൦.

=== Old system ===
11	20	21	30	110	10,099
൰൧	൨൰	൨൰൧	൩൰	൱൰	൰൲൯൰൯

Suppose the number is "2013". It is read in Malayalam as "രണ്ടായിരത്തി പതിമൂന്ന്" (raṇḍāyiratti padimūnnŭ). It is split into:

- രണ്ട് (raṇḍŭ) : 2 - ൨
- ആയിരം (āyiram) : 1000 - ൲
- പത്ത് (pattŭ) : 10 - ൰
- മൂന്ന് (mūnnŭ) : 3 - ൩

Combine them together to get the Malayalam number ൨൲൰൩.

=== Fractions ===
In Malayalam, you can transcribe any fraction by affixing (-il) after the denominator followed by the numerator, so a fraction like 7/10 would be read as പത്തിൽ ഏഴ് (pattil ēḻŭ) 'out of ten, seven' but fractions like 1/2 1/4 and 3/4 have distinct names (ara, kāl, mukkāl) and 1/8 (arakkāl) 'half quarter'.
