= Semiprime =

Product of two prime numbers

In number theory, a semiprime is a natural number that is the product of exactly two prime numbers. The two primes in the product may equal each other, so the semiprimes include the squares of prime numbers. Because there are infinitely many prime numbers, there are also infinitely many semiprime numbers. Semiprimes are also called biprimes, since they include two primes, or second numbers, by analogy with how "prime" means "first". Alternatively, semiprimes are called almost-prime numbers, specifically the "2-almost-prime" biprime and "3-almost-prime" triprime.

== Examples and variations ==
The semiprimes less than 100 are:

4, 6, 9, 10, 14, 15, 21, 22, 25, 26, 33, 34, 35, 38, 39, 46, 49, 51, 55, 57, 58, 62, 65, 69, 74, 77, 82, 85, 86, 87, 91, 93, 94, and 95 (sequence A001358 in the OEIS)

Semiprimes that are not square numbers are called discrete, distinct, or squarefree semiprimes:

6, 10, 14, 15, 21, 22, 26, 33, 34, 35, 38, 39, 46, 51, 55, 57, 58, 62, 65, 69, 74, 77, 82, 85, 86, 87, 91, 93, 94, 95, ... (sequence A006881 in the OEIS)

The semiprimes are the case $k=2$ of the $k$-almost primes, numbers with exactly $k$ prime factors. However some sources use "semiprime" to refer to a larger set of numbers, the numbers with at most two prime factors (including unit (1), primes, and semiprimes). These are:

1, 2, 3, 4, 5, 6, 7, 9, 10, 11, 13, 14, 15, 17, 19, 21, 22, 23, 25, 26, 29, 31, 33, 34, 35, 37, 38, 39, 41, 43, 46, 47, 49, ... (sequence A037143 in the OEIS)

== Formula for number of semiprimes ==
Let $\pi_2(n)$ denote the number of semiprimes less than or equal to n. Then
$$\pi_2(n) = \sum_{k=1}^{\pi \left(\sqrt n\right) } \left[\pi\left(\frac{n}{p_k}\right) - k + 1 \right]$$
where $\pi(x)$ is the prime-counting function and $p_k$ denotes the kth prime.

To see this, take $p_k$ to be the smaller prime factor. Then $p_k \le \sqrt n$, and the larger factor may be any prime $q$ satisfying $p_k \le q \le n/p_k$. The number of such primes is $\pi(n/p_k)-\pi(p_k-1)$. Since $p_k$ is the kth prime, $\pi(p_k-1)=k-1$, giving the summand $\pi(n/p_k)-k+1$.

== Properties ==
Semiprime numbers have no composite numbers as factors other than themselves. For example, the number 26 is semiprime and its only factors are 1, 2, 13, and 26, of which only 26 is composite.

For a squarefree semiprime $n=pq$ (with $p\ne q$) the value of Euler's totient function $\varphi(n)$ (the number of positive integers less than or equal to $n$ that are relatively prime to $n$) takes the simple form
$$\varphi(n)=(p-1)(q-1)=n-(p+q)+1.$$
This calculation is an important part of the application of semiprimes in the RSA cryptosystem. For a square semiprime $n=p^2$, the formula is again simple:
$$\varphi(n)=p(p-1)=n-p.$$

== Applications ==
The Arecibo message

Semiprimes are highly useful in the area of cryptography and number theory, most notably in public key cryptography, where they are used by RSA and pseudorandom number generators such as Blum Blum Shub. These methods rely on the fact that finding two large primes and multiplying them together (resulting in a semiprime) is computationally simple, whereas finding the original factors appears to be difficult. In the RSA Factoring Challenge, RSA Security offered prizes for the factoring of specific large semiprimes and several prizes were awarded. The original RSA Factoring Challenge was issued in 1991, and was replaced in 2001 by the New RSA Factoring Challenge, which was later withdrawn in 2007.

In 1974 the Arecibo message was sent with a radio signal aimed at a star cluster. It consisted of $1679$ binary digits intended to be interpreted as a $23 \times 73$ bitmap image. The number $1679=23\cdot 73$ was chosen because it is a semiprime and therefore can be arranged into a rectangular image in only two distinct ways (23 rows and 73 columns, or 73 rows and 23 columns).

== See also ==
- Chen's theorem
- Sphenic number, a product of three distinct primes
- Parity problem (sieve theory)
- Emirpimes
