= 80 (number) =

← 79	80	81 →
- ← 80 81 82 83 84 85 86 87 88 89 →: List of numbers; Integers; ← 0 10 20 30 40 50 60 70 80 90 →
- Cardinal: eighty
- Ordinal: 80th (eightieth)
- Numeral system: octogesimal
- Factorization: 2^{4} × 5
- Divisors: 1, 2, 4, 5, 8, 10, 16, 20, 40, 80 (10)
- Greek numeral: Π´
- Roman numeral: LXXX, lxxx
- Binary: 1010000_{2}
- Ternary: 2222_{3}
- Senary: 212_{6}
- Octal: 120_{8}
- Duodecimal: 68_{12}
- Hexadecimal: 50_{16}
- Armenian: Ձ
- Hebrew: פ / ף
- Babylonian numeral: 𒐕⟪
- Egyptian hieroglyph: 𓎍

80 (eighty) is the natural number following 79 and preceding 81.

== In mathematics ==
80 is:

- The sum of Euler's totient function φ(x) over the first sixteen integers:

1 + 1 + 2 + 2 + 4 + 2 + 6 + 4 + 6 + 4 + 10 + 4 + 12 + 6 + 8 + 8 = 80.

- A semiperfect number, since adding up some subsets of its divisors (e.g., 1, 4, 5, 10, 20, and 40) gives 80.
- A ménage number.
- Palindromic in bases 3 (2222_{3}), 6 (212_{6}), 9 (88_{9}), 15 (55_{15}), 19 (44_{19}), and 39 (22_{39}).
- A repdigit in bases 3, 9, 15, 19, and 39.
- The sum of the first four twin prime pairs:

(3 + 5) + (5 + 7) + (11 + 13) + (17 + 19) = 80.

The Pareto principle (also known as the 80-20 rule) states that, for many events, roughly 80% of the effects come from 20% of the causes.

Every solvable configuration of the 15 puzzle can be solved in no more than 80 single-tile moves.

=== In geometry ===
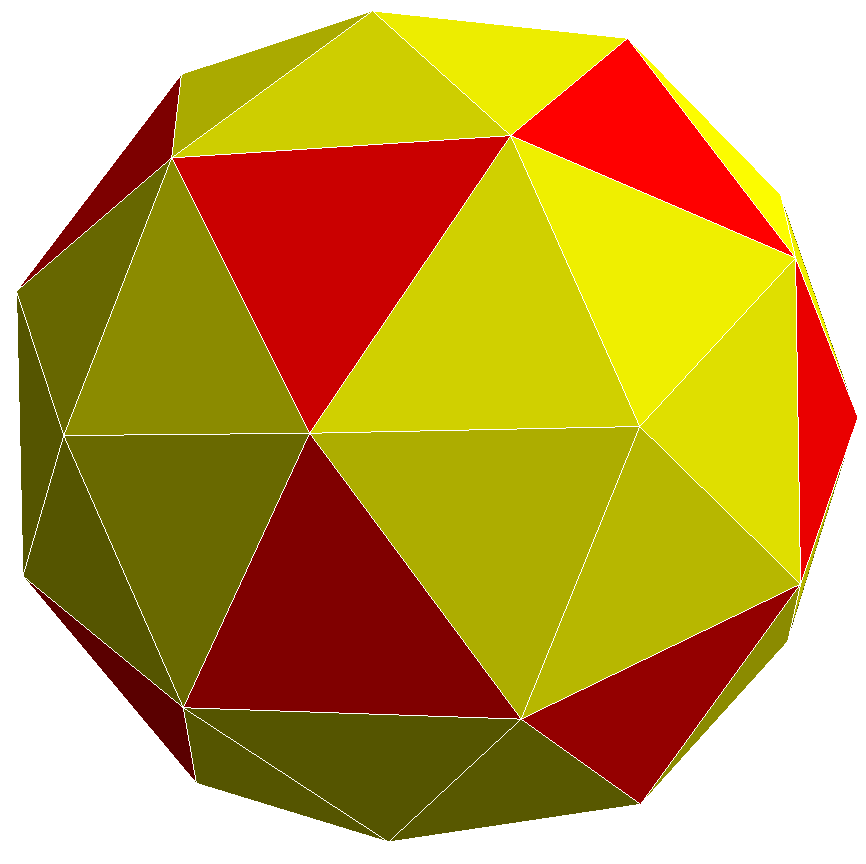
Pentakis icosidodecahedron

A pentakis icosidodecahedron contains a total of 80 faces. The great snub dodecicosidodecahedron has a Coxeter index of 80, the ditrigonal dodecadodecahedron has a Wenninger index of 80, and the pentagrammic crossed antiprism has a Maeder index of 80. The chamfered dodecahedron has a total of 80 vertices.

An octacontagon (ogdoëcontagon or 80-gon) is a polygon that contains 80 sides.

== In trade ==
In Northern Europe, there have traditionally been words for eighty units - often eggs or herrings: Wall in German, ol in Danish, and øll in Norwegian (all cognates).
