= 90 (number) =

Natural number between 89 and 91

← 89	90	91 →
- ← 90 91 92 93 94 95 96 97 98 99 →: List of numbers; Integers; ← 0 10 20 30 40 50 60 70 80 90 →
- Cardinal: ninety
- Ordinal: 90th (ninetieth)
- Factorization: 2 × 3^{2} × 5
- Divisors: 1, 2, 3, 5, 6, 9, 10, 15, 18, 30, 45, 90 (12)
- Greek numeral: Ϟ´
- Roman numeral: XC, xc
- Binary: 1011010_{2}
- Ternary: 10100_{3}
- Senary: 230_{6}
- Octal: 132_{8}
- Duodecimal: 76_{12}
- Hexadecimal: 5A_{16}
- Armenian: Ղ
- Hebrew: צ / ץ
- Babylonian numeral: 𒐕𒌍
- Egyptian hieroglyph: 𓎎

90 (ninety) is the natural number following 89 and preceding 91.

In the English language, the numbers 90 and 19 are often confused, as they sound very similar. When carefully enunciated, they differ in which syllable is stressed: 19 /naɪnˈtiːn/ vs 90 /ˈnaɪnti/.

== In mathematics ==
90 is a pronic number as it is the product of 9 and 10, and along with 12 and 56, one of only a few pronic numbers whose digits in decimal are also successive. 90 is divisible by the sum of its base-ten digits, which makes it the thirty-second Harshad number.

=== Properties of the number ===
- 90 is the only number to have an aliquot sum of 144 = 12^{2}.
- Only three numbers have a set of divisors that generate a sum equal to 90: they are 40, 58, and 89.
- 90 is also the twentieth abundant and highly abundant number (with 20 the first primitive abundant number and 70 the second).
- The number of divisors of 90 is 12. Other smaller numbers with this property are 60, 72 and 84. These four and 96 are the five double-digit numbers with exactly 12 divisors.
- 90 is the tenth and largest number to hold an Euler totient value of 24; no number has a totient that is 90, which makes it the eleventh nontotient (with 50 the fifth).

The twelfth triangular number 78 is the only number to have an aliquot sum equal to 90, aside from the square of the twenty-fourth prime, 89^{2} (which is centered octagonal). 90 is equal to the fifth sum of non-triangular numbers, respectively between the fifth and sixth triangular numbers, 15 and 21 (equivalently 16 + 17 ... + 20). It is also twice 45, which is the ninth triangular number, and the second-smallest sum of twelve non-zero integers, from two through thirteen $\{2,3,...,13\}$.

90 can be expressed as the sum of distinct non-zero squares in six ways, more than any smaller number (see image):

$(9^{2}+3^{2}),(8^{2}+5^{2}+1^{2}),(7^{2}+5^{2}+4^{2}),(8^{2}+4^{2}+3^{2}+1^{2}),(7^{2}+6^{2}+2^{2}+1^{2}),(6^{2}+5^{2}+4^{2}+3^{2}+2^{2})$.

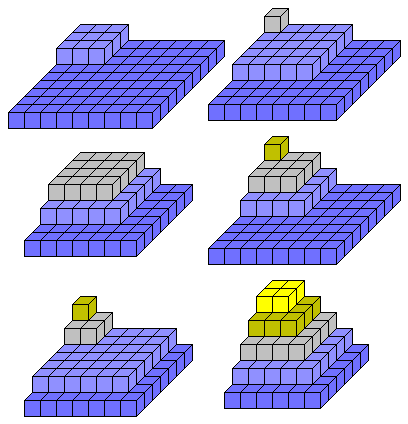
90 as the sum of distinct nonzero squares

The square of eleven 11^{2} = 121 is the ninetieth indexed composite number, where the sum of integers $\{2,3,...,11\}$ is 65, which in-turn represents the composite index of 90. In the fractional part of the decimal expansion of the reciprocal of 11 in base-10, "90" repeats periodically (when leading zeroes are moved to the end).

The eighteenth Stirling number of the second kind $S(n,k)$ is 90, from a $n$ of 6 and a $k$ of 3, as the number of ways of dividing a set of six objects into three non-empty subsets. 90 is also the sixteenth Perrin number from a sum of 39 and 51, whose difference is 12.

==== Prime sextuplets ====
The members of the first prime sextuplet (7, 11, 13, 17, 19, 23) generate a sum equal to 90, and the difference between respective members of the first and second prime sextuplets is also 90, where the second prime sextuplet is (97, 101, 103, 107, 109, 113). The last member of the second prime sextuplet, 113, is the 30th prime number. Since prime sextuplets are formed from prime members of lower order prime k-tuples, 90 is also a record maximal gap between various smaller pairs of prime k-tuples (which include quintuplets, quadruplets, and triplets). (Note: 90 is the record gap between the first pair of prime quintuplets of the form (p, p+2, p+6, p+8, p+12) (A201073), while 90 is a record between the second and third prime quintuplets that have the form (p, p+4, p+6, p+10, p+12) (A201062). Regarding prime quadruplets, 90 is the gap record between the second and third set of quadruplets (A113404). Prime triplets of the form (p, p+4, p+6) have a third record maximal gap of 90 between the second and ninth triplets (A201596), and while there is no record gap of 90 for prime triplets of the form (p, p+2, p+6), the first and third record gaps are of 6 and 60 (A201598), which are also unitary perfect numbers like 90 (A002827).)

==== Unitary perfect number ====
90 is the third unitary perfect number (after 6 and 60), since it is the sum of its unitary divisors excluding itself, and because it is equal to the sum of a subset of its divisors, it is also the twenty-first semiperfect number.

=== Right angle ===
A right angle measures ninety degrees.

An angle measuring 90 degrees is called a right angle. In normal space, the interior angles of a rectangle measure 90 degrees each, while in a right triangle, the angle opposing the hypotenuse measures 90 degrees, with the other two angles adding up to 90 for a total of 180 degrees.

=== Icosahedral symmetry ===
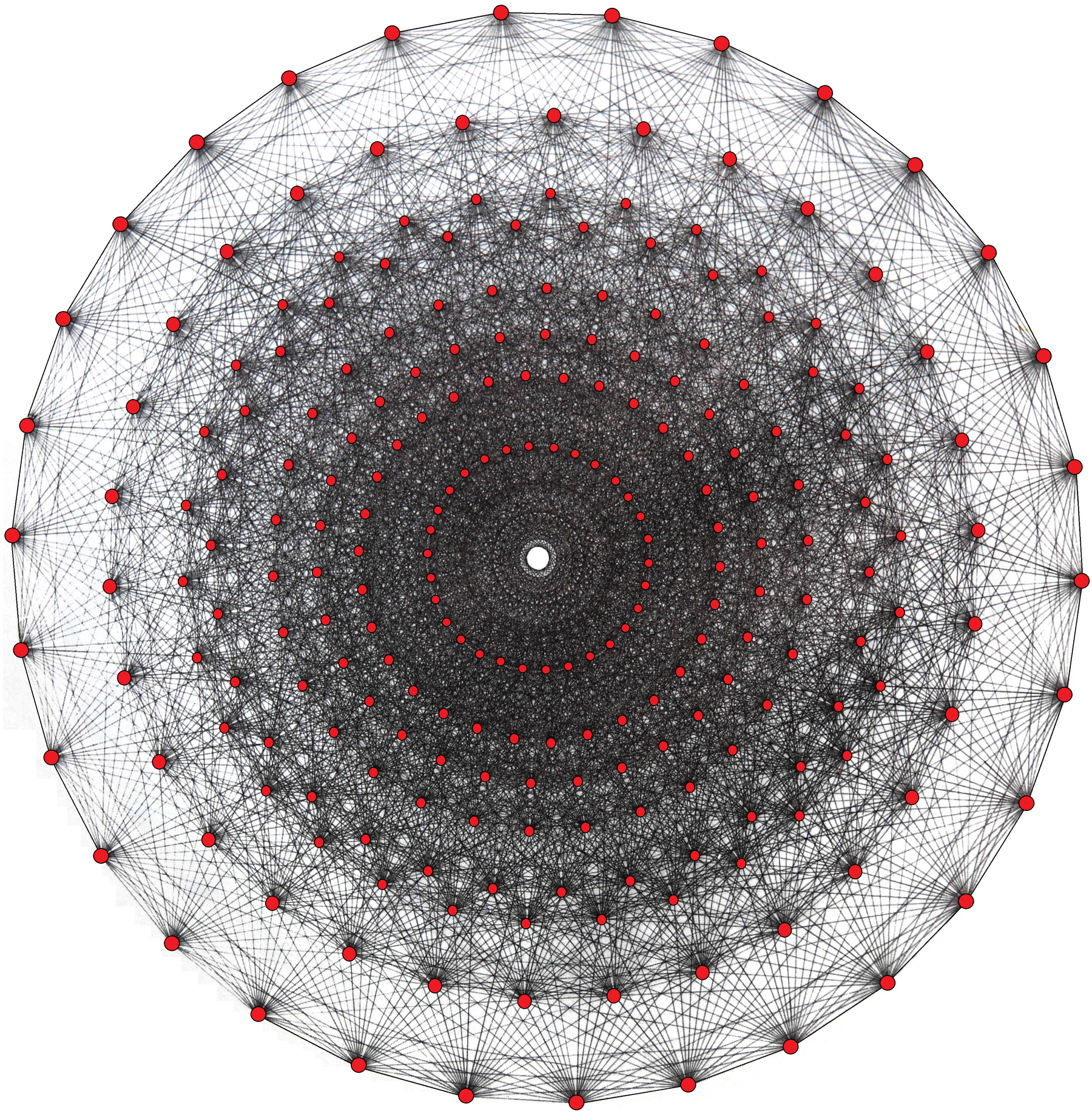
The Witting polytope, with ninety van Oss polytopes

==== Solids ====
The rhombic enneacontahedron is a zonohedron with a total of 90 rhombic faces: 60 broad rhombi akin to those in the rhombic dodecahedron with diagonals in $1:\sqrt2$ ratio, and another 30 slim rhombi with diagonals in $1:\varphi^{2}$ golden ratio. The obtuse angle of the broad rhombic faces is also the dihedral angle of a regular icosahedron, with the obtuse angle in the faces of golden rhombi equal to the dihedral angle of a regular octahedron and the tetrahedral vertex-center-vertex angle, which is also the angle between Plateau borders: 109.471°. It is the dual polyhedron to the rectified truncated icosahedron, a near-miss Johnson solid. On the other hand, the final stellation of the icosahedron has 90 edges. It also has 92 vertices like the rhombic enneacontahedron, when interpreted as a simple polyhedron. Meanwhile, the truncated dodecahedron and truncated icosahedron both have 90 edges. A further four uniform star polyhedra (U_{37}, U_{55}, U_{58}, U_{66}) and four uniform compound polyhedra (UC_{32}, UC_{34}, UC_{36}, UC_{55}) contain 90 edges or vertices.

==== Witting polytope ====
The self-dual Witting polytope contains ninety van Oss polytopes such that sections by the common plane of two non-orthogonal hyperplanes of symmetry passing through the center yield complex _{3}{4}_{3} Möbius–Kantor polygons. The root vectors of simple Lie group E_{8} are represented by the vertex arrangement of the $4_{21}$ polytope, which shares 240 vertices with the Witting polytope in four-dimensional complex space. By Coxeter, the incidence matrix configuration of the Witting polytope can be represented as:

$\left[\begin{smallmatrix}40&9&12\\4&90&4\\12&9&40\end{smallmatrix}\right]$ or $\left[\begin{smallmatrix}40&12&12\\2&240&2\\12&12&40\end{smallmatrix}\right]$

This Witting configuration when reflected under the finite space $\operatorname{PG}{(3,2^{2})}$ splits into 85 = 45 + 40 points and planes, alongside 27 + 90 + 240 = 357 lines.

Whereas the rhombic enneacontahedron is the zonohedrification of the regular dodecahedron, a honeycomb of Witting polytopes holds vertices isomorphic to the E_{8} lattice, whose symmetries can be traced back to the regular icosahedron via the icosian ring.

=== Cutting an annulus ===
The maximal number of pieces that can be obtained by cutting an annulus with twelve cuts is 90 (and equivalently, the number of 12-dimensional polyominoes that are prime).
