= 30 (number) =

← 29	30	31 →
- ← 30 31 32 33 34 35 36 37 38 39 →: List of numbers; Integers; ← 0 10 20 30 40 50 60 70 80 90 →
- Cardinal: thirty
- Ordinal: 30th (thirtieth)
- Factorization: 2 × 3 × 5
- Divisors: 1, 2, 3, 5, 6, 10, 15, 30
- Greek numeral: Λ´
- Roman numeral: XXX, xxx
- Binary: 11110_{2}
- Ternary: 1010_{3}
- Senary: 50_{6}
- Octal: 36_{8}
- Duodecimal: 26_{12}
- Hexadecimal: 1E_{16}
- Armenian: Լ
- Hebrew: ל
- Babylonian numeral: 𒌍
- Egyptian hieroglyph: 𓎐

30 (thirty) is the natural number following 29 and preceding 31.

== In mathematics ==
30 is a square pyramidal number.

30 is a composite, a regular number, a pronic number, and a primorial.

30 is largest number such that all coprimes smaller than itself, except for 1, are prime.

The SI prefix for 10^{30} is Quetta- (Q), and for 10^{−30} (i.e., the reciprocal of 10^{30}) quecto (q). These numbers are the largest and smallest number to receive an SI prefix to date.

== In other fields ==
Thirty is used (as –30–) to indicate the end of a newspaper (or broadcast) story, a copy editor's typographical notation.

There are 30 days in the months April, June, September and November (and in unusual circumstances February—see February 30). Although the number of days in a month vary, 30 is used to estimate months elapsing.

30 years of marriage is marked by the pearl wedding anniversary.

== History and literature ==
- Age 30 is when Jewish priests traditionally start their service (according to Numbers 4:3).
- One of the rallying cries of the 1960s student/youth protest movement was the slogan, "Don't trust anyone over thirty".
- In The Myth of Sisyphus the French existentialist Albert Camus comments that the age of thirty is a crucial period in the life of a man, for at that age he gains a new awareness of the meaning of time.
