= 10 =

| ← 9 | 10 | 11 → |
- ← 10 11 12 13 14 15 16 17 18 19 →: List of numbers; Integers; ← 0 10 20 30 40 50 60 70 80 90 →
- Cardinal: ten
- Ordinal: 10th (tenth)
- Numeral system: decimal
- Factorization: 10
- Divisors: 1, 2, 5, 10
- Greek numeral: Ι´
- Roman numeral: X, x
- Roman numeral (unicode): X, x
- Greek prefix: deca-/deka-
- Latin prefix: deci-
- Binary: 1010_{2}
- Ternary: 101_{3}
- Senary: 14_{6}
- Octal: 12_{8}
- Duodecimal: A_{12}
- Hexadecimal: A_{16}
- Chinese numeral: 十，拾
- Hebrew: י (Yod)
- Khmer: ១០
- Armenian: Ժ
- Tamil: ௰
- Thai: ๑๐
- Devanāgarī: १०
- Santali: ᱑᱐
- Bengali: ১০
- Arabic & Kurdish & Iranian: ١٠
- Malayalam: ൰
- Egyptian hieroglyph: 𓎆
- Babylonian numeral: 𒌋

10 (ten) is the natural number following 9 and preceding 11. Ten is the base of decimal numeral systems, the most common systems for denoting numbers in both spoken and written language.

The English name for the number "ten" originates from the Proto-Germanic root *tehun, which in turn comes from the Proto-Indo-European root *déḱm̥. This root is the source of similar words for "ten" in many other Germanic languages. The widespread use of decimal systems is believed to be because humans have ten fingers and ten toes, which people may have used to count by.

== Linguistics ==
- A collection of ten items (most often ten years) is called a decade.
- The ordinal form is tenth. The adjectives decimal and denary refer to systems or quantities based on ten. * Increasing a quantity by one order of magnitude is most widely understood to mean multiplying the quantity by ten.
- To reduce something by one tenth is to decimate. (In ancient Rome, the killing of one in ten soldiers in a cohort was the punishment for cowardice or mutiny; or, one-tenth of the able-bodied men in a village as a form of retribution, thus causing a labor shortage and threat of starvation in agrarian societies.)

== Mathematics ==
The tetractys

As the base of the decimal numeral system, powers of ten are used to express orders of magnitude and form the basis of common scientific notation.

- 10 is a composite number and a happy number.
- 10 = 1010_{2}
- 9^{1}+9^{0} = 10
- 10^{-1} = 10%
- a!•b! = c! Least value for c is 10 ie: 6!•7!=10
- 10 is the smallest noncototient number.
- Ten is the fourth triangular number and the third tetrahedral number: 1+2+3+4 = (1)+(1+2)+(1+2+3) = 10

$$10=1+2+3+4=\binom{5}{2}=\binom{5}{3}.$$

This representation underlies the tetractys, a triangular figure of ten points important in Pythagoreanism.

- A ten sided polygon is called a decagon.

=== List of basic calculations ===
| Multiplication | 1 | 2 | 3 | 4 | 5 | 6 | 7 | 8 | 9 | 10 | 11 | 12 | 13 | 14 | 15 | 16 | 20 | 25 | 50 | 100 | 1000 |
|---|---|---|---|---|---|---|---|---|---|---|---|---|---|---|---|---|---|---|---|---|---|
| 10 × x | 10 | 20 | 30 | 40 | 50 | 60 | 70 | 80 | 90 | 100 | 110 | 120 | 130 | 140 | 150 | 160 | 200 | 250 | 500 | 1000 | 10000 |

| Division | 1 | 2 | 3 | 4 | 5 | 6 | 7 | 8 | 9 | 10 | 11 | 12 | 13 | 14 | 15 |
|---|---|---|---|---|---|---|---|---|---|---|---|---|---|---|---|
| 10 ÷ x | 10 | 5 | 3.3̅ | 2.5 | 2 | 1.6̅ | 1.4̅2̅8̅5̅7̅1̅ | 1.25 | 1.1̅ | 1 | 0.9̅0̅ | 0.83̅ | 0.7̅6̅9̅2̅3̅0̅ | 0.7̅1̅4̅2̅8̅5̅ | 0.6̅ |
| x ÷ 10 | 0.1 | 0.2 | 0.3 | 0.4 | 0.5 | 0.6 | 0.7 | 0.8 | 0.9 | 1 | 1.1 | 1.2 | 1.3 | 1.4 | 1.5 |

| Exponentiation | 1 | 2 | 3 | 4 | 5 | 6 | 7 | 8 | 9 | 10 |
|---|---|---|---|---|---|---|---|---|---|---|
| 10^{x} | 10 | 100 | 1000 | 10000 | 100000 | 1000000 | 10000000 | 100000000 | 1000000000 | 10000000000 |
| x^{10} | 1 | 1024 | 59049 | 1048576 | 9765625 | 60466176 | 282475249 | 1073741824 | 3486784401 | 10000000000 |
