= 8 =

Natural number

← 7	8	9 →
- −1 0 1 2 3 4 5 6 7 8 9 →: List of numbers; Integers; ← 0 10 20 30 40 50 60 70 80 90 →
- Cardinal: eight
- Ordinal: 8th (eighth)
- Numeral system: octal
- Factorization: 2^{3}
- Divisors: 1, 2, 4, 8
- Greek numeral: Η´
- Roman numeral: VIII, viii
- Greek prefix: octa-/oct-
- Latin prefix: octo-/oct-
- Binary: 1000_{2}
- Ternary: 22_{3}
- Senary: 12_{6}
- Octal: 10_{8}
- Duodecimal: 8_{12}
- Hexadecimal: 8_{16}
- Greek: η (or Η)
- Arabic, Kurdish, Persian, Sindhi, Urdu: ٨
- Amharic: ፰
- Bengali: ৮
- Chinese numeral: 八,捌
- Devanāgarī: ८
- Santali: ᱘
- Kannada: ೮
- Malayalam: ൮
- Telugu: ౮
- Tamil: ௮
- Hebrew: ח
- Khmer: ៨
- Thai: ๘
- Armenian: Ը ը
- Babylonian numeral: 𒐜
- Egyptian hieroglyph: 𓐁
- Morse code: _ _ _..

8 (eight) is the natural number following 7 and preceding 9.

== Etymology ==
English eight, from Old English eahta, æhta, Proto-Germanic *ahto is a direct continuation of the hypothesized Proto-Indo-European *oḱtṓ(w)-, and as such cognate with Greek ὀκτώ and Latin octo-, both of which stems are reflected by the English prefix oct(o)-, as in the ordinal adjective octaval or octavary, the distributive adjective is octonary. The adjective octuple (Latin octu-plus) may also be used as a noun, meaning "a set of eight items"; the diminutive octuplet is mostly used to refer to eight siblings delivered in one birth.

The Semitic numeral is based on a root *θmn-, whence Akkadian smn-, Arabic ṯmn-, Hebrew šmn- etc. The Chinese numeral, written 八 (Mandarin: bā; Cantonese: baat), is from Old Chinese *priāt-, ultimately from Sino-Tibetan b-r-gyat or b-g-ryat which also yielded Tibetan brgyat.

It has been argued that, as the cardinal number 7 is the highest number of items that can universally be cognitively processed as a single set, the etymology of the numeral eight might be the first to be considered composite, either as "twice four" or as "two short of ten", or similar. The Turkic words for "eight" are from a Proto-Turkic stem *sekiz, which has been suggested as originating as a negation of eki "two", as in "without two fingers" (i.e., "two short of ten; two fingers are not being held up"); this same principle is found in Uralic *kakteksa, which conveys a meaning of "two before (ten)". The Proto-Indo-European reconstruction *oḱtṓ(w)- itself has been argued as representing an old dual, which would correspond to an original meaning of "twice four". Proponents of this "quaternary hypothesis" adduce the numeral 9, which might be built on the stem new-, meaning "new" (indicating the beginning of a "new set of numerals" after having counted to eight).

== Evolution of the Arabic digit ==
Evolution of the numeral 8 from the Brahmi numerals to the Arabic numerals

The modern digit 8, like all modern Arabic numerals other than zero, originates with the Brahmi numerals. The Brahmi digit for eight by the 1st century was written in one stroke as a curve └┐ looking like an uppercase H with the bottom half of the left line and the upper half of the right line removed. However, the digit for eight used in India in the early centuries of the Common Era developed considerable graphic variation, and in some cases took the shape of a single wedge, which was adopted into the Perso-Arabic tradition as ٨ (and also gave rise to the later Devanagari form ८); the alternative curved glyph also existed as a variant in Perso-Arabic tradition, where it came to look similar to our digit 5.

The digits as used in Al-Andalus by the 10th century were a distinctive western variant of the glyphs used in the Arabic-speaking world, known as ghubār numerals (ghubār translating to "sand table"). In these digits, the line of the 5-like glyph used in Indian manuscripts for eight came to be formed in ghubār as a closed loop, which was the 8-shape that became adopted into European use in the 10th century.

Just as in most modern typefaces, in typefaces with text figures the character for the digit 8 usually has an ascender, as, for example, in .

The infinity symbol ∞, described as a "sideways figure eight", is unrelated to the digit 8 in origin; it is first used (in the mathematical meaning "infinity") in the 17th century, and it may be derived from the Roman numeral for "one thousand" CIƆ, or alternatively from the final Greek letter, ω.

== In mathematics ==
8 is a composite number and the first number which is neither prime nor semiprime. By Mihăilescu's Theorem, it is the only nonzero perfect power that is one less than another perfect power. 8 is the first proper Leyland number of the form x^{y} + y^{x}, where in its case x and y both equal 2. 8 is a Fibonacci number and the only nontrivial Fibonacci number that is a perfect cube. Sphenic numbers always have exactly eight divisors. 8 is the base of the octal number system.

=== Geometry ===
A polygon with eight sides is an octagon. A regular octagon can fill a plane-vertex with a regular triangle and a regular icositetragon, as well as tessellate two-dimensional space alongside squares in the truncated square tiling. This tiling is one of eight Archimedean tilings that are semi-regular, or made of more than one type of regular polygon, and the only tiling that can admit a regular octagon. The Ammann–Beenker tiling is a nonperiodic tesselation of prototiles that feature prominent octagonal silver eightfold symmetry, that is the two-dimensional orthographic projection of the four-dimensional 8-8 duoprism.

An octahedron is a regular polyhedron with eight equilateral triangles as faces. is the dual polyhedron to the cube and one of eight convex deltahedra. The stella octangula, or eight-pointed star, is the only stellation with octahedral symmetry. It has eight triangular faces alongside eight vertices that forms a cubic faceting, composed of two self-dual tetrahedra that makes it the simplest of five regular compounds. The cuboctahedron, on the other hand, is a rectified cube or rectified octahedron, and one of only two convex quasiregular polyhedra. It contains eight equilateral triangular faces, whose first stellation is the cube-octahedron compound.

=== Vector spaces ===
The octonions are a hypercomplex normed division algebra that are an extension of the complex numbers. They are a double cover of special orthogonal group SO(8). The special unitary group SO(3) has an eight-dimensional adjoint representation whose colors are ascribed gauge symmetries that represent the vectors of the eight gluons in the Standard Model. Clifford algebras display a periodicity of 8.

=== Group theory ===
The Lie group E_{8} has rank 8, and is one of 5 exceptional Lie groups. The order of the smallest non-abelian group whose subgroups are all normal is 8.

The Bott periodicity theorem describes the eightfold periodicity of the homotopy groups of the direct limit of the orthogonal groups O(n). This has many manifestations in mathematics, including the representations of Clifford algebras.

=== List of basic calculations ===
Multiplication	1	2	3	4	5	6	7	8	9	10	11	12	13	14	15
8 × x	8	16	24	32	40	48	56	64	72	80	88	96	104	112	120

Division	1	2	3	4	5	6	7	8	9	10	11	12	13	14	15
8 ÷ x	8	4	2.6̅	2	1.6	1.3̅	1.1̅4̅2̅8̅5̅7̅	1	0.8̅	0.8	0.7̅2̅	0.6̅	0.6̅1̅5̅3̅8̅4̅	0.5̅7̅1̅4̅2̅8̅	0.53̅
x ÷ 8	0.125	0.25	0.375	0.5	0.625	0.75	0.875	1	1.125	1.25	1.375	1.5	1.625	1.75	1.875

Exponentiation	1	2	3	4	5	6	7	8	9	10	11	12	13
8^{x}	8	64	512	4096	32768	262144	2097152	16777216	134217728	1073741824	8589934592	68719476736	549755813888
x^{8}	1	256	6561	65536	390625	1679616	5764801	16777216	43046721	100000000	214358881	429981696	815730721

== In science ==
=== Physics ===
In nuclear physics, the second magic number.

=== Chemistry ===
The number eight plays a central role in chemistry, particularly in the context of the octet rule (also known as the eight-electron rule). According to this theory, atoms of the main group elements from the second period of the periodic table onwards strive to have a maximum of eight outer electrons (valence electrons) in molecules in order to achieve a stable noble gas configuration. This rule applies in particular to the elements carbon, nitrogen, oxygen and fluorine, as these often form compounds in which they achieve eight valence electrons. The atomic number eight is also significant in chemistry, as it represents the element oxygen, which is in the eighth position in the periodic table.

== In technology ==
NATO signal flag for 8

- A byte is commonly 8 bits.

== In culture ==
=== Currency ===
- Sailors and civilians alike from the 1500s onward referred to evenly divided parts of the Spanish dollar as "pieces of eight", or "bits".

=== In religion, folk belief and divination ===
==== Buddhism ====
In Buddhism, the 8-spoked Dharmacakra represents the Noble Eightfold Path.

In general, "eight" seems to be an auspicious number for Buddhists. The Dharmacakra, a Buddhist symbol, has eight spokes. The Buddha's principal teaching—the Four Noble Truths—ramifies as the Noble Eightfold Path and the Buddha emphasizes the importance of the eight attainments or jhanas.

==== Islam ====
The octagram Rub el Hizb

- The octagram Rub el Hizb is often used in Islamic symbology.

==== As a lucky number ====
- The number eight is considered to be a lucky number in Chinese and other Asian cultures. Eight (八; accounting 捌; pinyin bā) is considered a lucky number in Chinese culture because it sounds like the word meaning to generate wealth (發(T) 发(S); Pinyin: fā). Property with the number 8 may be valued greatly by Chinese. For example, a Hong Kong number plate with the number 8 was sold for $640,000. The opening ceremony of the Summer Olympics in Beijing started at 8 seconds and 8 minutes past 8 p.m. (local time) on 8 August 2008.
- In Pythagorean numerology the number 8 represents victory, prosperity and overcoming.
- Eight (八, hachi, ya) is also considered a lucky number in Japan, but the reason is different from that in Chinese culture. Eight gives an idea of growing prosperous, because the letter (八) broadens gradually.
- The Japanese thought of eight (や, ya) as a holy number in the ancient times. The reason is less well-understood, but it is thought that it is related to the fact they used eight to express large numbers vaguely such as manyfold (やえはたえ, Yae Hatae) (literally, eightfold and twentyfold), many clouds (やくも, Yakumo) (literally, eight clouds), millions and millions of Gods (やおよろずのかみ, Yaoyorozu no Kami) (literally, eight millions of Gods), etc. It is also guessed that the ancient Japanese gave importance to pairs, so some researchers guess twice as four (よ, yo), which is also guessed to be a holy number in those times because it indicates the world (north, south, east, and west) might be considered a very holy number.
- In numerology, 8 is the number of building, and in some theories, also the number of destruction.

==== In astrology ====
- In the Middle Ages, 8 was the number of "unmoving" stars in the sky, and symbolized the perfection of incoming planetary energy.

=== In sports and other games ===
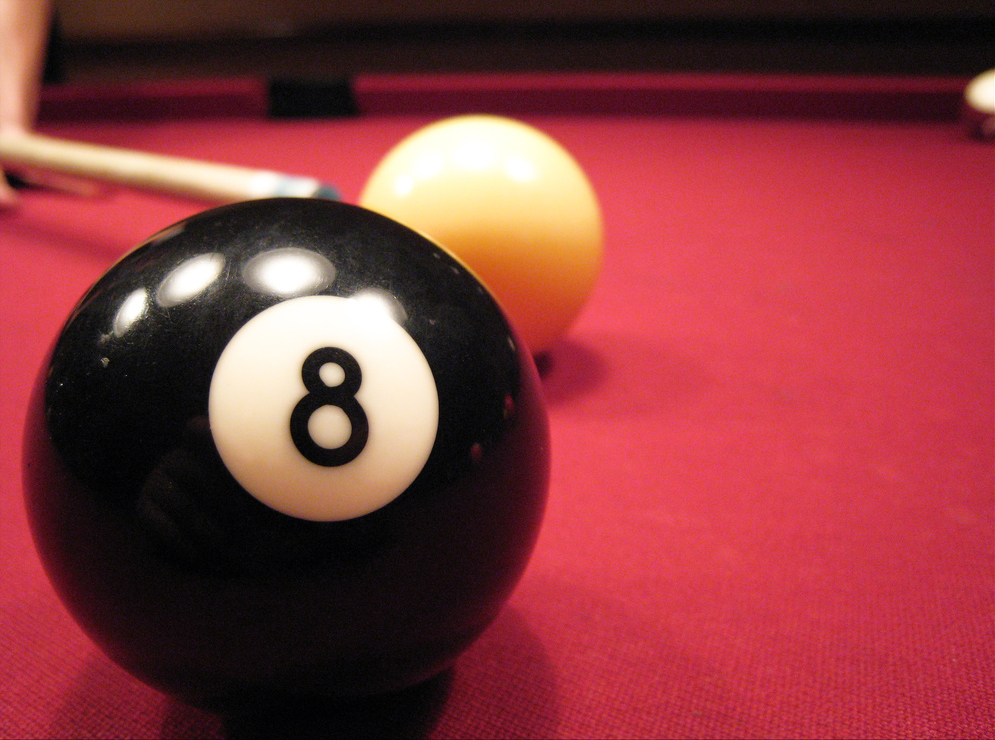
An 8-ball in pool

- In association football, the number 8 has historically been the number of the Central Midfielder.
- In baseball:
  - The center fielder is designated as number 8 for scorekeeping purposes.
- In rugby league:
  - Most competitions (though not the Super League, which uses static squad numbering) use a position-based player numbering system in which one of the two starting props wears the number 8.
- In the 2008 Games of the XXIX Olympiad held in Beijing, the official opening was on 08/08/08 at 8:08:08 p.m. CST.

=== In literature ===
- In Terry Pratchett's Discworld series, eight is a magical number and is considered taboo. Eight is not safe to be said by wizards on the Discworld and is the number of Bel-Shamharoth. Also, there are eight days in a Disc week and eight colours in a Disc spectrum, the eighth one being octarine.

=== In slang ===
- An "eighth" is a common measurement of marijuana, meaning an eighth of an ounce. It is also a common unit of sale for psilocybin mushrooms.
- In Colombia and Venezuela, "volverse un ocho" (meaning to tie oneself in a figure 8) refers to getting in trouble or contradicting oneself.
- In China, "8" is used in chat speak as a term for parting. This is due to the closeness in pronunciation of "8" (bā) and the English word "bye".

=== Other uses ===
- A figure 8 is the common name of a geometric shape, often used in the context of sports, such as skating. Figure-eight turns of a rope or cable around a cleat, pin, or bitt are used to belay something.
