= 117 (number) =

← 116	117	118 →
- ← 110 111 112 113 114 115 116 117 118 119 →: List of numbers; Integers; ← 0 100 200 300 400 500 600 700 800 900 →
- Cardinal: one hundred seventeen
- Ordinal: 117th (one hundred seventeenth)
- Factorization: 3^{2} × 13
- Divisors: 1, 3, 9, 13, 39, 117
- Greek numeral: ΡΙΖ´
- Roman numeral: CXVII, cxvii
- Binary: 1110101_{2}
- Ternary: 11100_{3}
- Senary: 313_{6}
- Octal: 165_{8}
- Duodecimal: 99_{12}
- Hexadecimal: 75_{16}

117 (one hundred [and] seventeen) is the natural number following 116 and preceding 118.

== In mathematics ==
117 is the smallest possible length of the longest edge of an integer Heronian tetrahedron (a tetrahedron whose edge lengths, face areas and volume are all integers). Its other edge lengths are 51, 52, 53, 80 and 84.

117 is a pentagonal number.

== In other fields ==
117 can be a substitute for the number 17, which is considered unlucky in Italy. When Renault exported the R17 to Italy, it was renamed R117.

In the Danish language the number 117 (Danish: hundredesytten) is often used as a hyperbolic term to represent an arbitrary but large number.

== See also ==
- 117 (disambiguation)
