= Ruth–Aaron pair =

Two consecutive integers for which the sums of the prime factors of each are equal

In mathematics, a Ruth–Aaron pair consists of two consecutive integers (e.g., 714 and 715) for which the sums of the prime factors of each integer are equal:

714 = 2 × 3 × 7 × 17,
715 = 5 × 11 × 13,

and

2 + 3 + 7 + 17 = 5 + 11 + 13 = 29.

There are different variations in the definition, depending on how many times to count primes that appear multiple times in a factorization.

The name was given by Carl Pomerance for Babe Ruth and Hank Aaron, as Ruth's career regular-season home run total was 714, a record which Aaron eclipsed on April 8, 1974, when he hit his 715th career home run. Pomerance was a mathematician at the University of Georgia at the time Aaron (a member of the nearby Atlanta Braves) broke Ruth's record, and the student of one of Pomerance's colleagues noticed that the sums of the prime factors of 714 and 715 were equal.

== Examples ==
If only distinct prime factors are counted, the first few Ruth–Aaron pairs are:

(5, 6), (24, 25), (49, 50), (77, 78), (104, 105), (153, 154), (369, 370), (492, 493), (714, 715), (1682, 1683), (2107, 2108)

(The lesser of each pair is listed in OEIS: A006145).

Counting repeated prime factors (e.g., 8 = 2×2×2 and 9 = 3×3 with 2+2+2 = 3+3), the first few Ruth–Aaron pairs are:

(5, 6), (8, 9), (15, 16), (77, 78), (125, 126), (714, 715), (948, 949), (1330, 1331)

(The lesser of each pair is listed in OEIS: A039752).

The intersection of the two lists begins:

(5, 6), (77, 78), (714, 715), (5405, 5406).

(The lesser of each pair is listed in OEIS: A039753).

Any Ruth–Aaron pair of square-free integers belongs to both lists with the same sum of prime factors. The intersection also contains pairs that are not square-free, for example (7129199, 7129200) = (7×11^{2}×19×443, 2^{4}×3×5^{2}×13×457). Here 7+11+19+443 = 2+3+5+13+457 = 480, and also 7+11+11+19+443 = 2+2+2+2+3+5+5+13+457 = 491.

== Density ==
Ruth-Aaron pairs are sparse (that is, they have density 0). This was conjectured by Nelson et al. in 1974 and proven in 1978 by Paul Erdős and Pomerance.

== Ruth–Aaron triplets ==
Ruth–Aaron triplets (overlapping Ruth–Aaron pairs) also exist (OEIS: A227654). The two first when counting distinct prime factors are:

89460294 = 2 × 3 × 7 × 11 × 23 × 8419,
89460295 = 5 × 4201 × 4259,
89460296 = 2 × 2 × 2 × 31 × 43 × 8389,
and 2 + 3 + 7 + 11 + 23 + 8419 = 5 + 4201 + 4259 = 2 + 31 + 43 + 8389 = 8465.

151165960539 = 3 × 11 × 11 × 83 × 2081 × 2411,
151165960540 = 2 × 2 × 5 × 7 × 293 × 1193 × 3089,
151165960541 = 23 × 29 × 157 × 359 × 4021,
and 3 + 11 + 83 + 2081 + 2411 = 2 + 5 + 7 + 293 + 1193 + 3089 = 23 + 29 + 157 + 359 + 4021 = 4589.

Three more examples are known, starting at 3089285427491, 6999761340223, and 7539504384825.

The first two Ruth–Aaron triplets when counting repeated prime factors:

417162 = 2 × 3 × 251 × 277,
417163 = 17 × 53 × 463,
417164 = 2 × 2 × 11 × 19 × 499,
and 2 + 3 + 251 + 277 = 17 + 53 + 463 = 2 + 2 + 11 + 19 + 499 = 533.

6913943284 = 2 × 2 × 37 × 89 × 101 × 5197,
6913943285 = 5 × 283 × 1259 × 3881,
6913943286 = 2 × 3 × 167 × 2549 × 2707,
and 2 + 2 + 37 + 89 + 101 + 5197 = 5 + 283 + 1259 + 3881 = 2 + 3 + 167 + 2549 + 2707 = 5428.

There are no further examples below $10^{13}$.

== See also ==
- Maris–McGwire–Sosa pair
