= 118 (number) =

← 117	118	119 →
- ← 110 111 112 113 114 115 116 117 118 119 →: List of numbers; Integers; ← 0 100 200 300 400 500 600 700 800 900 →
- Cardinal: one hundred eighteen
- Ordinal: 118th (one hundred eighteenth)
- Factorization: 2 × 59
- Divisors: 1, 2, 59, 118
- Greek numeral: ΡΙΗ´
- Roman numeral: CXVIII, cxviii
- Binary: 1110110_{2}
- Ternary: 11101_{3}
- Senary: 314_{6}
- Octal: 166_{8}
- Duodecimal: 9A_{12}
- Hexadecimal: 76_{16}

118 (one hundred [and] eighteen) is the natural number following 117 and preceding 119.

== In mathematics ==
There is no solution to the equation φ(x) = 118, making 118 a nontotient.

Four expressions for 118 as the sum of three positive integers have the same product:

14 + 50 + 54 = 15 + 40 + 63 = 18 + 30 + 70 = 21 + 25 + 72 = 118 and
14 × 50 × 54 = 15 × 40 × 63 = 18 × 30 × 70 = 21 × 25 × 72 = 37800.

118 is the smallest number that can be expressed as four sums with the same product in this way.

Because of its expression as 118 = 3^{5} − 5^{3}, it is a Leyland number of the second kind.

118!! - 1 is a prime number, where !! denotes the double factorial (the product of even integers up to 118).

== In chemistry ==
As of 2025, 118 elements have an official name assigned by IUPAC, the last of which (number 118) being oganesson.

== See also ==
- 118 (disambiguation)
