= 113 (number) =

← 112	113	114 →
- ← 110 111 112 113 114 115 116 117 118 119 →: List of numbers; Integers; ← 0 100 200 300 400 500 600 700 800 900 →
- Cardinal: one hundred thirteen
- Ordinal: 113th (one hundred thirteenth)
- Factorization: prime
- Prime: 30th
- Divisors: 1, 113
- Greek numeral: ΡΙΓ´
- Roman numeral: CXIII, cxiii
- Binary: 1110001_{2}
- Ternary: 11012_{3}
- Senary: 305_{6}
- Octal: 161_{8}
- Duodecimal: 95_{12}
- Hexadecimal: 71_{16}

113 (one hundred [and] thirteen) is the natural number following 112 and preceding 114.

== Mathematics ==
113 is a prime number, a Sophie Germain prime, an emirp, an isolated prime, a Chen prime, a highly cototient number, a centered square number, and a Proth prime as it is a prime number of the form $7\times 2^{4}+1.$ 113 is also an Eisenstein prime with no imaginary part and real part of the form $3n - 1$. In decimal, this prime is a primeval number and a permutable prime with 131 and 311.

113 is the denominator of 355/113, an accurate approximation to π.

$F_7(113) = \frac{113^{128} + 1}{2}$ is the smallest generalized Fermat prime with odd base and $k \geq 7$.

The ratio $\frac{\pi(x)}{x/\ln x}$, where $\pi$ is the prime-counting function, attains its maximum value of $\frac{30 \ln 113}{113} \approx 1.255059$ at $x = 113$.
