= 111 (number) =

| ← 110 | 111 | 112 → |
- ← 110 111 112 113 114 115 116 117 118 119 →: List of numbers; Integers; ← 0 100 200 300 400 500 600 700 800 900 →
- Cardinal: one hundred eleven
- Ordinal: 111th (one hundred eleventh)
- Factorization: 3 × 37
- Divisors: 1, 3, 37, 111
- Greek numeral: ΡΙΑ´
- Roman numeral: CXI, cxi
- Binary: 1101111_{2}
- Ternary: 11010_{3}
- Senary: 303_{6}
- Octal: 157_{8}
- Duodecimal: 93_{12}
- Hexadecimal: 6F_{16}

111 (one hundred [and] eleven) is the natural number following 110 and preceding 112.

== In mathematics ==
111 is the fourth non-trivial nonagonal number, and the seventh perfect totient number.

111 is furthermore the ninth number such that its Euler totient $\varphi(n)$ of 72 is equal to the totient value of its sum-of-divisors:

$\varphi(111) = \varphi(\sigma(111)).$

Two other of its multiples (333 and 555) also have the same property (with totients of 216 and 288, respectively). (Note: Also, The 111th composite number 146 is the twelfth number whose totient value is the same value held by its sum-of-divisors. The sequence of nonagonal numbers that precede 111 is {0, 1, 9, 24, 46, 75}, members which add to 146 (without including 9).; 357, in turn the index of 444 as a composite, is the twentieth such number, following 333.; The composite index of 1000 is 831, the thirty-fifth member in this sequence of numbers to have a totient also shared by its sum-of-divisors, where 1000 is 1 + 999.; The only two numbers in decimal less than 1000 whose prime factorisations feature primes concatenated into a new prime are 138 and 777 (as 2 × 3 × 23 and 3 × 7 × 37, respectively), which add to 915. This sum represents the 38th member in the aforementioned sequence.)

=== Magic squares ===
111 is adjacent to 110 and 112, the minimal side lengths of perfect squared squares that are tiled by smaller squares of distinct side lengths.

The smallest magic square using only 1 and prime numbers has a magic constant of 111:

| 31 | 73 | 7 |
| 13 | 37 | 61 |
| 67 | 1 | 43 |

Also, a six-by-six magic square using the numbers 1 to 36 also has a magic constant of 111:

| 1 | 11 | 31 | 29 | 19 | 20 |
| 2 | 22 | 24 | 25 | 8 | 30 |
| 3 | 33 | 26 | 23 | 17 | 9 |
| 34 | 27 | 10 | 12 | 21 | 7 |
| 35 | 14 | 15 | 16 | 18 | 13 |
| 36 | 4 | 5 | 6 | 28 | 32 |

(The square has this magic constant because 1 + 2 + 3 + ... + 34 + 35 + 36 = 666, and 666 / 6 = 111). (Note: Relatedly, 111 is also the magic constant of the n-Queens Problem for n = 6.)

On the other hand, 111 lies between 110 and 112, which are the two smallest edge-lengths of squares that are tiled in the interior by smaller squares of distinct edge-lengths (see, squaring the square).

=== Properties in certain radices ===
111 is $R_{3}$ or the second repunit in decimal, a number like 11, 111, or 1111 that consists of repeated units, or ones. 111 equals 3 × 37, therefore all triplets (numbers like 222 or 777) in base ten are repdigits of the form $3n \times 37$. As a repunit, it also follows that 111 is a palindromic number. All triplets in all bases are multiples of 111 in that base, therefore the number represented by 111 in a particular base is the only triplet that can ever be prime. 111 is not prime in decimal, but is prime in base two, where 111_{2} = 7_{10}. It is also prime in many other bases up to 128 (3, 5, 6, ..., 119) (sequence A002384 in the OEIS). In base 10, it is furthermore a strobogrammatic number, as well as a Harshad number.

In base 18, the number 111 is 7^{3} (= 343_{10}) which is the only base where 111 is a perfect power.

== See also ==
- 111 is the atomic number of roentgenium.
- The number 111 is called a Nelson in cricket, famously considered unlucky by umpire David Shepherd.
