= 115 (number) =

← 114	115	116 →
- ← 110 111 112 113 114 115 116 117 118 119 →: List of numbers; Integers; ← 0 100 200 300 400 500 600 700 800 900 →
- Cardinal: one hundred fifteen
- Ordinal: 115th (one hundred fifteenth)
- Factorization: 5 × 23
- Divisors: 1, 5, 23, 115
- Greek numeral: ΡΙΕ´
- Roman numeral: CXV, cxv
- Binary: 1110011_{2}
- Ternary: 11021_{3}
- Senary: 311_{6}
- Octal: 163_{8}
- Duodecimal: 97_{12}
- Hexadecimal: 73_{16}

115 (one hundred [and] fifteen) is the natural number following 114 and preceding 116.

== In mathematics ==
115 has a square sum of divisors:

$$\sigma(115)=1+5+23+115=144=12^2.$$

There are 115 different rooted trees with exactly eight nodes, 115 inequivalent ways of placing six rooks on a 6 × 6 chess board in such a way that no two of the rooks attack each other, and 115 solutions to the stamp folding problem for a strip of seven rectangular stamps.

115 is also a heptagonal pyramidal number. The 115th Woodall number,

$$115\cdot 2^{115}-1=4\;776\;913\;109\;852\;041\;418\;248\;056\;622\;882\;488\;319,$$

is a prime number. 115 is the sum of the first five heptagonal numbers.

== See also ==
- 115 (disambiguation)
