= 116 (number) =

← 115	116	117 →
- ← 110 111 112 113 114 115 116 117 118 119 →: List of numbers; Integers; ← 0 100 200 300 400 500 600 700 800 900 →
- Cardinal: one hundred sixteen
- Ordinal: 116th (one hundred sixteenth)
- Factorization: 2^{2} × 29
- Divisors: 1, 2, 4, 29, 58, 116
- Greek numeral: ΡΙϚ´
- Roman numeral: CXVI, cxvi
- Binary: 1110100_{2}
- Ternary: 11022_{3}
- Senary: 312_{6}
- Octal: 164_{8}
- Duodecimal: 98_{12}
- Hexadecimal: 74_{16}

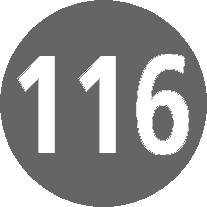
Bus line logo in Montpellier

116 (one hundred [and] sixteen) is the natural number following 115 and preceding 117.

== In mathematics ==
116 is a noncototient, meaning that there is no solution to the equation m − φ(m) = n, where φ stands for Euler's totient function.

116! + 1 is a factorial prime.

There are 116 ternary Lyndon words of length six, and 116 irreducible polynomials of degree six over a three-element field, which form the basis of a free Lie algebra of dimension 116.

There are 116 different ways of partitioning the numbers from 1 through 5 into subsets in such a way that, for every k, the union of the first k subsets is a consecutive sequence of integers.

There are 116 different 6×6 Costas arrays.

== See also ==
- 116 (disambiguation)
