= 114 (number) =

← 113	114	115 →
- ← 110 111 112 113 114 115 116 117 118 119 →: List of numbers; Integers; ← 0 100 200 300 400 500 600 700 800 900 →
- Cardinal: one hundred fourteen
- Ordinal: 114th (one hundred fourteenth)
- Factorization: 2 × 3 × 19
- Divisors: 1, 2, 3, 6, 19, 38, 57, 114
- Greek numeral: ΡΙΔ´
- Roman numeral: CXIV, cxiv
- Binary: 1110010_{2}
- Ternary: 11020_{3}
- Senary: 310_{6}
- Octal: 162_{8}
- Duodecimal: 96_{12}
- Hexadecimal: 72_{16}

114 (one hundred [and] fourteen) is the natural number following 113 and preceding 115.

== In mathematics ==
114 is an abundant number, a sphenic number and a Harshad number. There is no answer to the equation φ(x) = 114, making 114 a nontotient. 114 appears in the Padovan sequence, preceded by the terms 49, 65, 86 (it is the sum of the first two of these).

114 is the sum of the first four hyperfactorials, including H(0). At 114, the Mertens function sets a new low of -6, a record that stands until 197.

114 is the smallest positive integer which has yet to be represented as a^{3} + b^{3} + c^{3}, where a, b, and c are integers. It is conjectured that 114 can be represented this way. (*Excluding integers of the form 9k ± 4, for which solutions are known not to exist.)

== See also ==
- 114 (disambiguation)
