= 102 (number) =

← 101	102	103 →
- ← 100 101 102 103 104 105 106 107 108 109 →: List of numbers; Integers; ← 0 100 200 300 400 500 600 700 800 900 →
- Cardinal: one hundred two
- Ordinal: 102nd (one hundred second)
- Factorization: 2 × 3 × 17
- Divisors: 1, 2, 3, 6, 17, 34, 51, 102
- Greek numeral: ΡΒ´
- Roman numeral: CII, cii
- Binary: 1100110_{2}
- Ternary: 10210_{3}
- Senary: 250_{6}
- Octal: 146_{8}
- Duodecimal: 86_{12}
- Hexadecimal: 66_{16}

102 (one hundred [and] two) is the natural number following 101 and preceding 103.

== In mathematics ==
102 is an abundant number and a semiperfect number. It is a sphenic number.

The sum of Euler's totient function φ(x) over the first eighteen integers is 102.

102 is the first three-digit base 10 polydivisible number, since 1 is divisible by 1, 10 is divisible by 2 and 102 is divisible by 3. This also shows that 102 is a Harshad number. 102 is the first 3-digit number divisible by the numbers 3, 6, 17, 34 and 51.

102^{64} + 1 is a prime number.

There are 102 vertices in the Biggs–Smith graph.
