= 127 (number) =

← 126	127	128 →
- ← 120 121 122 123 124 125 126 127 128 129 →: List of numbers; Integers; ← 0 100 200 300 400 500 600 700 800 900 →
- Cardinal: one hundred twenty-seven
- Ordinal: 127th (one hundred twenty-seventh)
- Factorization: prime
- Prime: 31st
- Divisors: 1, 127
- Greek numeral: ΡΚΖ´
- Roman numeral: CXXVII, cxxvii
- Binary: 1111111_{2}
- Ternary: 11201_{3}
- Senary: 331_{6}
- Octal: 177_{8}
- Duodecimal: A7_{12}
- Hexadecimal: 7F_{16}

127 (one hundred [and] twenty-seven) is the natural number following 126 and preceding 128. It is also a prime number.

== In mathematics ==
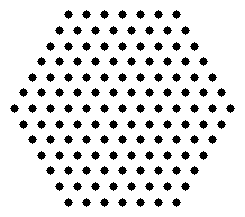
127 as a centered hexagonal number

- As a Mersenne prime, 127 is related to the perfect number 8128. 127 is also the largest known Mersenne prime exponent for a Mersenne number, $2^{127}-1$, which is also a Mersenne prime. It was discovered by Édouard Lucas in 1876 and held the record for the largest known prime for 75 years.
  - $2^{127}-1$ is the largest prime ever discovered by hand calculations as well as the largest known double Mersenne prime.
  - Furthermore, 127 is equal to $2^{7}-1$, and 7 is equal to $2^{3}-1$, and 3 is the smallest Mersenne prime, making 7 the smallest double Mersenne prime and 127 the smallest triple Mersenne prime.
- There are a total of 127 prime numbers between 2,000 and 3,000.
- 127 is also a cuban prime of the form $p=\frac{x^{3}-y^{3}}{x-y}$, $x=y+1$. The next prime is 131, with which it comprises a cousin prime. Because the next odd number, 129, is a semiprime, 127 is a Chen prime. 127 is greater than the arithmetic mean of its two neighboring primes; thus, it is a strong prime.
- 127 is a centered hexagonal number.
- It is the seventh Motzkin number.
- 127 is a palindromic prime in nonary and binary.
- 127 is the first Friedman prime in decimal. It is also the first nice Friedman number in decimal, since $127=-1+2^{7} \,$, as well as binary since $1111111 = (1 + 1)^{111} - 1 \,$ .
- 127 is the sum of the sums of the divisors of the first twelve positive integers.
- 127 is the smallest prime that can be written as the sum of the first two or more odd primes: $127 = 3 + 5 + 7 + 11 + 13 + 17 + 19 + 23 + 29$.
- 127 is the smallest odd number that cannot be written in the form $p+2^{x}$, for p is a prime number, and x is an integer, since $127 - 2^0=126,$ $127 - 2^1=125,$ $127 - 2^2=123,$ $127 - 2^3=119,$ $127 - 2^4=111,$ $127 - 2^5=95,$ and $127 - 2^6=63$ are all composite numbers.
- 127 is an isolated prime where neither $p-2$ nor $p+2$ is prime.
- 127 is the smallest digitally delicate prime in binary.
- 127 is the 31st prime number and therefore it is the smallest Mersenne prime with a Mersenne prime index.
- 127 is the largest number with the property $127 = 1\cdot\textrm{prime}(1) + 2\cdot\textrm{prime}(2) + 7\cdot\textrm{prime}(7),$ where $\textrm{prime}(n)$ is the nth prime number. There are only two numbers with that property; the other one is 43.
- 127 is equal to $\textrm{prime}^{6}(1),$ where $\textrm{prime}(n)$ is the nth prime number.
- 127 is the number of non-equivalent ways of expressing 10,000 as the sum of two prime numbers.
- 127 is the integer as floor of the imaginary part of the 42th non-trivial zero of the Riemann zeta-function.
- 127 is the smallest prime number that results in a decimal greater than 4 when divided by its prime index. 127 divided by 31 is 4 with a remainder of 3.
- 127 is a Lucky number which is generated by a certain "sieve".
- 127 is the 8th term in the prime number variation of Flavius's sieve.
- 127 is a Fortunate number which is linked to the primorials.
- 127 is the 11th super-prime.
- In Wilson's primeth recurrence, 127 is the sixth featuring prime, it being the 31st prime number and 31 being the fifth featuring.

== In other fields ==
- The non-printable "Delete" (DEL) control character in ASCII.
- Linotype (and Intertype) machines used brass matrices with one of 127 possible combinations punched into the top to enable the matrices to return to their proper channel in the magazine.
- NCT 127 is a Korean boy band.
