= 122 (number) =

← 121	122	123 →
- ← 120 121 122 123 124 125 126 127 128 129 →: List of numbers; Integers; ← 0 100 200 300 400 500 600 700 800 900 →
- Cardinal: one hundred twenty-two
- Ordinal: 122nd (one hundred twenty-second)
- Factorization: 2 × 61
- Divisors: 1, 2, 61, 122
- Greek numeral: ΡΚΒ´
- Roman numeral: CXXII, cxxii
- Binary: 1111010_{2}
- Ternary: 11112_{3}
- Senary: 322_{6}
- Octal: 172_{8}
- Duodecimal: A2_{12}
- Hexadecimal: 7A_{16}

122 (one hundred [and] twenty-two) is the natural number following 121 and preceding 123.

== In mathematics ==
- 122 is a nontotient since there is no integer with exactly 122 coprimes below it. Nor is there an integer with exactly 122 integers with common factors below it, making 122 a noncototient as well.
- 122 is a semiprime.
- φ(122) = φ(σ(122)).
