= 112 (number) =

← 111	112	113 →
- ← 110 111 112 113 114 115 116 117 118 119 →: List of numbers; Integers; ← 0 100 200 300 400 500 600 700 800 900 →
- Cardinal: one hundred twelve
- Ordinal: 112th (one hundred twelfth)
- Factorization: 2^{4} × 7
- Divisors: 1, 2, 4, 7, 8, 14, 16, 28, 56, 112
- Greek numeral: ΡΙΒ´
- Roman numeral: CXII, cxii
- Binary: 1110000_{2}
- Ternary: 11011_{3}
- Senary: 304_{6}
- Octal: 160_{8}
- Duodecimal: 94_{12}
- Hexadecimal: 70_{16}

112 (one hundred [and] twelve) is the natural number following 111 and preceding 113.

== Mathematics ==
112 is an abundant number, a heptagonal number, and a Harshad number.

There are 112 connected graphs on 6 unlabeled nodes.

If an equilateral triangle has sides of length 112, then it contains an interior point at integer distances 57, 65, and 73 from its vertices. This is the smallest possible side length of an equilateral triangle that contains a point at integer distances from the vertices.
