= 124 (number) =

← 123	124	125 →
- ← 120 121 122 123 124 125 126 127 128 129 →: List of numbers; Integers; ← 0 100 200 300 400 500 600 700 800 900 →
- Cardinal: one hundred twenty-four
- Ordinal: 124th (one hundred twenty-fourth)
- Factorization: 2^{2} × 31
- Divisors: 1, 2, 4, 31, 62, 124
- Greek numeral: ΡΚΔ´
- Roman numeral: CXXIV, cxxiv
- Binary: 1111100_{2}
- Ternary: 11121_{3}
- Senary: 324_{6}
- Octal: 174_{8}
- Duodecimal: A4_{12}
- Hexadecimal: 7C_{16}

124 (one hundred [and] twenty-four) is the natural number following 123 and preceding 125.

== In mathematics ==
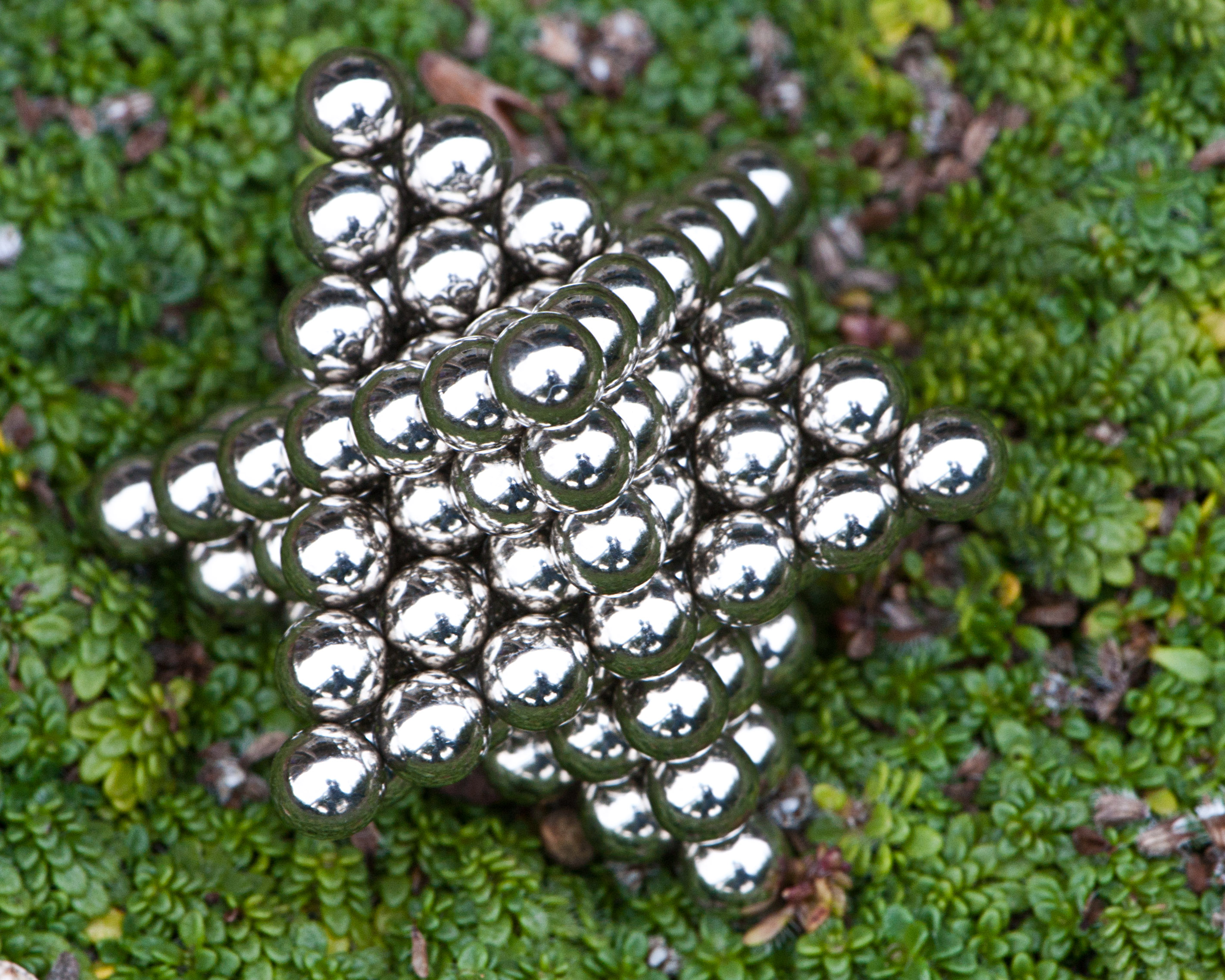
124 magnetic balls arranged into the shape of a stella octangula

124 is an untouchable number, meaning that it is not the sum of proper divisors of any positive number.

It is a stella octangula number, the number of spheres packed in the shape of a stellated octahedron. It is also an icosahedral number.

There are 124 different polygons of length 12 formed by edges of the integer lattice, counting two polygons as the same only when one is a translated copy of the other.

124 is a perfectly partitioned number, meaning that it divides the number of partitions of 124. It is the first number to do so after 1, 2, and 3.
