= 121 (number) =

← 120	121	122 →
- ← 120 121 122 123 124 125 126 127 128 129 →: List of numbers; Integers; ← 0 100 200 300 400 500 600 700 800 900 →
- Cardinal: one hundred twenty-one
- Ordinal: 121st (one hundred twenty-first)
- Factorization: 11^{2}
- Divisors: 1, 11, 121
- Greek numeral: ΡΚΑ´
- Roman numeral: CXXI, cxxi
- Binary: 1111001_{2}
- Ternary: 11111_{3}
- Senary: 321_{6}
- Octal: 171_{8}
- Duodecimal: A1_{12}
- Hexadecimal: 79_{16}

121 (one hundred [and] twenty-one) is the natural number following 120 and preceding 122.

== In mathematics ==
121 is

- a square (11 × 11)
- the sum of the powers of 3 from 0 to 4, so a repunit in ternary. Furthermore, 121 is the only square of the form $1 + p + p^2 + p^3 + p^4$, where p is prime (3, in this case).
- the sum of three consecutive prime numbers (37 + 41 + 43).
- As $5! + 1 = 121$, it provides a solution to Brocard's problem. There are only two other squares known to be of the form $n! + 1$. Another example of 121 being one of the few numbers supporting a conjecture is that Fermat conjectured that 4 and 121 are the only perfect squares of the form $x^{3}-4$ (with x being 2 and 5, respectively).
- It is also a star number, a centered tetrahedral number, and a centered octagonal number.

A Chinese checkers board has 121 holes.

- In decimal, it is a Smith number since its digits add up to the same value as its factorization (which uses the same digits) and as a consequence of that it is a Friedman number ($11^2$). But it cannot be expressed as the sum of any other number plus that number's digits, making 121 a self number.
- The smallest composite number to not be a multiple of 2, 3, 5 or 7.
