= 128 (number) =

← 127	128	129 →
- ← 120 121 122 123 124 125 126 127 128 129 →: List of numbers; Integers; ← 0 100 200 300 400 500 600 700 800 900 →
- Cardinal: one hundred twenty-eight
- Ordinal: 128th (one hundred twenty-eighth)
- Factorization: 2^{7}
- Divisors: 1, 2, 4, 8, 16, 32, 64, 128
- Greek numeral: ΡΚΗ´
- Roman numeral: CXXVIII, cxxviii
- Binary: 10000000_{2}
- Ternary: 11202_{3}
- Senary: 332_{6}
- Octal: 200_{8}
- Duodecimal: A8_{12}
- Hexadecimal: 80_{16}

128 (one hundred [and] twenty-eight) is the natural number following 127 and preceding 129.

== In mathematics ==
128 is the seventh power of 2. It is the largest number which cannot be expressed as the sum of any number of distinct squares. However, it is divisible by the total number of its divisors, making it a refactorable number.

The sum of Euler's totient function φ(x) over the first twenty integers is 128.

128 can be expressed by a combination of its digits with mathematical operators, thus 128 = 2^{8 − 1}, making it a Friedman number in base 10.

A hepteract has 128 vertices.

128 is the only 3-digit number that is a 7th power (2^{7}).

== In computing ==
- 128-bit key size encryption for secure communications over the Internet
  - IPv6 uses 128-bit (16-byte) addresses
  - Any bit with a binary prefix is 128 bytes of a lesser binary prefix value, such as 1 gibibit is 128 mebibytes
  - 128-bit integers, memory addresses, or other data units are those that are at most 128 bits 16 octets wide

All 128 possible states of the seven-segment display.

- A 128-bit integer can represent up to 3.40282366...e+38 values (2^{128} = 340,282,366,920,938,463,463,374,607,431,768,211,456).
- CAST-128 is a block cipher used in a number of products, notably as the default cipher in some versions of GPG and PGP.

== In other fields ==
- The number of US fluid ounces in a US gallon.
