= 129 (number) =

| ← 128 | 129 | 130 → |
- ← 120 121 122 123 124 125 126 127 128 129 →: List of numbers; Integers; ← 0 100 200 300 400 500 600 700 800 900 →
- Cardinal: one hundred twenty-nine
- Ordinal: 129th (one hundred twenty-ninth)
- Factorization: 3 × 43
- Divisors: 1, 3, 43, 129
- Greek numeral: ΡΚΘ´
- Roman numeral: CXXIX, cxxix
- Binary: 10000001_{2}
- Ternary: 11210_{3}
- Senary: 333_{6}
- Octal: 201_{8}
- Duodecimal: A9_{12}
- Hexadecimal: 81_{16}

129 (one hundred [and] twenty-nine) is the natural number following 128 and preceding 130.

== In mathematics ==
129 is the sum of the first ten prime numbers. It is the smallest number that can be expressed as a sum of three squares in four different ways: $11^2+2^2+2^2$, $10^2+5^2+2^2$, $8^2+8^2+1^2$, and $8^2+7^2+4^2$.

129 is the product of only two primes, 3 and 43, making 129 a semiprime. Since 3 and 43 are both Gaussian primes, this means that 129 is a Blum integer.

129 is a repdigit in base 6 (333).

129 is a happy number.

129 is a centered octahedral number.
