= 123 (number) =

← 122	123	124 →
- ← 120 121 122 123 124 125 126 127 128 129 →: List of numbers; Integers; ← 0 100 200 300 400 500 600 700 800 900 →
- Cardinal: one hundred twenty-three
- Ordinal: 123rd (one hundred twenty-third)
- Factorization: 3 × 41
- Divisors: 1, 3, 41, 123
- Greek numeral: ΡΚΓ´
- Roman numeral: CXXIII, cxxiii
- Binary: 1111011_{2}
- Ternary: 11120_{3}
- Senary: 323_{6}
- Octal: 173_{8}
- Duodecimal: A3_{12}
- Hexadecimal: 7B_{16}

123 (one hundred [and] twenty-three) is the natural number following 122 and preceding 124.

== In mathematics ==
- 123 is a Lucas number. It is the eleventh member of the Mian–Chowla sequence.
- Along with 6, 123 is one of only two positive integers that is simultaneously two more than a perfect square and two less than a perfect cube (123 = 11^{2} + 2 = 5^{3} - 2).
- 123 is an emirpimes since it is a semiprime, and its reversal (321) is also semiprime.

== In religion ==
In numerology, the sequence of 123 is associated with progress and the Holy Trinity, so it may be referred to as the Trinity of Progress or Triad of Progress.
