= 105 (number) =

← 104	105	106 →
- ← 100 101 102 103 104 105 106 107 108 109 →: List of numbers; Integers; ← 0 100 200 300 400 500 600 700 800 900 →
- Cardinal: one hundred five
- Ordinal: 105th (one hundred fifth)
- Factorization: 3 × 5 × 7
- Divisors: 1, 3, 5, 7, 15, 21, 35, 105
- Greek numeral: ΡΕ´
- Roman numeral: CV, cv
- Binary: 1101001_{2}
- Ternary: 10220_{3}
- Senary: 253_{6}
- Octal: 151_{8}
- Duodecimal: 89_{12}
- Hexadecimal: 69_{16}

105 (one hundred [and] five) is the natural number following 104 and preceding 106.

== In mathematics ==
105 is the 14th triangular number, a dodecagonal number, and the first Zeisel number. It is the first odd sphenic number. 105 is the double factorial of 7. It is also the sum of the first five square pyramidal numbers.

It is in the middle of the prime quadruplet (101, 103, 107, 109). The only other such numbers less than a thousand are 9, 15, 195, and 825. It is also the middle of the only prime sextuplet (97, 101, 103, 107, 109, 113) between the ones occurring at 7-23 and at 16057–16073.

105 is the product of the first three odd primes ($3\times5\times7$) and is less than the square of the next prime (11) by more than 8. Therefore, for $n=105$, n ± 2, ± 4, and ± 8 must be prime (a prime k-tuple). In contrast, n ± 6, ± 10, ± 12, and ± 14 must be composite, making a prime gap on either side.

105 is a pseudoprime to the prime bases 13, 29, 41, 43, 71, 83, and 97. The distinct prime factors of 105 add up to 15, and so do those of 104; hence, the two numbers form a Ruth-Aaron pair under the first definition.

105 is a number n for which $n - 2^k$ is prime, for $0 < k < log_2(n)$. (This works up to $k = 8$, ignoring the negative sign.)

105 is the smallest integer such that the factorization of $x^n-1$ over Q includes non-zero coefficients other than $\pm 1$. In other words, the 105th cyclotomic polynomial, Φ_{105}, is the first with coefficients other than $\pm 1$.

There are 105 parallelogram polyominoes with 7 cells.
