= CIX =

CIX can refer to:

- CIX (website), an online conferencing system that started as an early British dial-up bulletin board
- FAP Captain José Abelardo Quiñones González International Airport, the airport of Chiclayo, in north of Peru
- Commercial Internet eXchange, a forerunner of the commercial Internet in the US
- 109 (disambiguation) in Roman numerals
- CIX (band), a South Korean boy group
- Croatian Internet eXchange, Internet exchange point in Croatia
