= 103 (number) =

← 102	103	104 →
- ← 100 101 102 103 104 105 106 107 108 109 →: List of numbers; Integers; ← 0 100 200 300 400 500 600 700 800 900 →
- Cardinal: one hundred three
- Ordinal: 103rd (one hundred third)
- Factorization: prime
- Prime: 27th
- Greek numeral: ΡΓ´
- Roman numeral: CIII, ciii
- Binary: 1100111_{2}
- Ternary: 10211_{3}
- Senary: 251_{6}
- Octal: 147_{8}
- Duodecimal: 87_{12}
- Hexadecimal: 67_{16}

103 (one hundred [and] three) is the natural number following 102 and preceding 104.

== In mathematics ==
103 is a prime number, and the largest prime factor of $6!+1=721=7\cdot 103$. The previous prime is 101. This makes 103 a twin prime. It is the fifth irregular prime, because it divides the numerator of the Bernoulli number
$$B_{24}=-\frac{236364091}{2730}=-\frac{103\cdot 2294797}{2730}.$$

The equation $64^3+94^3=103^3+1$ makes 103 part of a "Fermat near miss".

There are 103 different connected series-parallel partial orders on exactly six unlabeled elements.

103 is conjectured to be the smallest number for which repeatedly reversing the digits of its ternary representation, and adding the number to its reversal, does not eventually reach a ternary palindrome.
