= 106 (number) =

← 105	106	107 →
- ← 100 101 102 103 104 105 106 107 108 109 →: List of numbers; Integers; ← 0 100 200 300 400 500 600 700 800 900 →
- Cardinal: one hundred six
- Ordinal: 106th (one hundred sixth)
- Factorization: 2 × 53
- Divisors: 1, 2, 53, 106
- Greek numeral: ΡϚ´
- Roman numeral: CVI, cvi
- Binary: 1101010_{2}
- Ternary: 10221_{3}
- Senary: 254_{6}
- Octal: 152_{8}
- Duodecimal: 8A_{12}
- Hexadecimal: 6A_{16}

106 (one hundred [and] six) is the natural number following 105 and preceding 107.

== In mathematics ==
106 is a centered pentagonal number, a centered heptagonal number, and a regular 19-gonal number. There are 106 mathematical trees with ten vertices.

== See also ==
- 106 (disambiguation)
