= 101 (number) =

← 100	101	102 →
- ← 100 101 102 103 104 105 106 107 108 109 →: List of numbers; Integers; ← 0 100 200 300 400 500 600 700 800 900 →
- Cardinal: one hundred [and] one
- Ordinal: 101st (one hundred [and] first)
- Factorization: prime
- Prime: 26th
- Divisors: 1, 101
- Greek numeral: ΡΑ´
- Roman numeral: CI
- Binary: 1100101_{2}
- Ternary: 10202_{3}
- Senary: 245_{6}
- Octal: 145_{8}
- Duodecimal: 85_{12}
- Hexadecimal: 65_{16}

101 (one hundred [and] one) is the natural number following 100 and preceding 102.

It is variously pronounced "one hundred and one" / "a hundred and one", "one hundred one" / "a hundred one", and "one oh one". As an ordinal number, 101st (one hundred [and] first), rather than 101th, is the correct form.

101 is a prime number and the smallest integer above 100. It is also a palindromic number, and hence, a palindromic prime.

== In mathematics ==
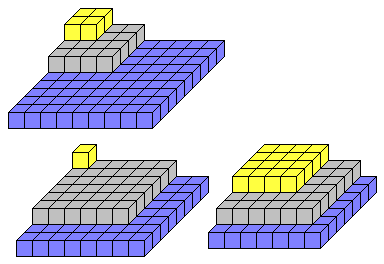
101 as the sum of three distinct nonzero squares

101 is an alternating factorial, sexy prime and 101 is also the smallest number that can be expressed as the sum of three distinct nonzero squares in more than two ways: $9^2+4^2+2^2$, $8^2+6^2+1^2$ or $7^2+6^2+4^2$ (see image).

For a 3-digit number in decimal, this number has a relatively simple divisibility test. The candidate number is split into groups of four, starting with the rightmost four, and added up to produce a 4-digit number. If this 4-digit number is of the form $1000a+100b+10a+b$ (where a and b are integers from 0 to 9), such as 3232 or 9797, or of the form $100b+b$, such as 707 and 808, then the number is divisible by 101.

== In books ==
According to Books in Print, more books are now published with a title that begins with '101' than '100'. They usually describe or discuss a list of items, such as 101 Ways to... or 101 Questions and Answers About... . This marketing tool is used to imply that the customer is given a little extra information beyond books that include only 100 items. Some books have taken this marketing scheme even further with titles that begin with '102', '103', or '1001'. The number is used in this context as a slang term when referring to "a 101 document" what is usually referred to as a statistical survey or overview of some topic.

In the book 1984, written by George Orwell, Room 101 is a designated room used for torture by the Thought Police of Oceania, where the greatest fear known to the Thought Police is unleashed upon the victim.

== In education ==
In American university course numbering systems, the number 101 is often used for an introductory course at a beginner's level in a department's subject area. This common numbering system was designed to make transfer between colleges easier. It can also indicate a course for students not intending to major in the subject; e.g. a student intending to major in English would take English 111 not English 101.

In theory, any numbered course in one academic institution should bring a student to the same standard as a similarly numbered course at other institutions. One of earliest such usages, perhaps the first, was by the University of Buffalo in 1929. However, this convention is not universally prevalent. For example, at the various University of California campuses, all three-digit numbers including 101 denote upper division courses that typically have prior coursework in the subject as prerequisites.

Based on this usage, the term "101" (pronounced /ˌwʌnoʊˈwʌn/ WUN-oh-WUN) has gained a slang sense referring to basic knowledge of a topic or a collection of introductory materials to a topic, as in the sentence, "Boiling potatoes is Cooking 101". The Oxford English Dictionary records the usage of "101" in this slang sense from 1986.

== In other fields ==
In public life:

- In Hinduism, 101 is a lucky number.
- 101st kilometre, a condition of release from the Gulag in the Soviet Union.
- 101 is the main Police Emergency Number in Belgium.
- 101 is the Single Non-Emergency Number (SNEN) in some parts of the UK, a telephone number used to call emergency services that are urgent but not emergencies. 101 is now available across all areas of England and Wales.

In technology:

- An HTTP status code indicating that the server is switching protocols as requested by the client to do so.
