= 125 (number) =

← 124	125	126 →
- ← 120 121 122 123 124 125 126 127 128 129 →: List of numbers; Integers; ← 0 100 200 300 400 500 600 700 800 900 →
- Cardinal: one hundred twenty-five
- Ordinal: 125th (one hundred twenty-fifth)
- Factorization: 5^{3}
- Divisors: 1, 5, 25, 125
- Greek numeral: ΡΚΕ´
- Roman numeral: CXXV, cxxv
- Binary: 1111101_{2}
- Ternary: 11122_{3}
- Senary: 325_{6}
- Octal: 175_{8}
- Duodecimal: A5_{12}
- Hexadecimal: 7D_{16}

125 (one hundred [and] twenty-five) is the natural number following 124 and preceding 126.

== In mathematics ==

125 is the cube of 5. It can be expressed as a sum of two squares in two different ways, 125 = 10² + 5² = 11² + 2².

125 and 126 form a Ruth-Aaron pair under the second definition in which repeated prime factors are counted as often as they occur.

Like many other powers of 5, it is a Friedman number in base 10 since 125 = 5^{1 + 2}.

125 is the center of a close triplet of perfect powers, (121 = 11^{2}, 125 = 5^{3}, 128 = 2^{7}). Excluding the trivial cases of 0 and 1, the only closer such triplet is (4,8,9) and the only other equally close is (25, 27, 32).

== Anniversary ==
The 125th anniversary of an event is celebrated as the quasquicentennial.
