= 11/4 =

11/4 may refer to:

- November 4 (month-day date notation)
- April 11 (day-month date notation)
- 11 shillings and 4 pence in UK predecimal currency
- A type of hendecagram

== See also ==
- 114 (disambiguation)
- 4/11 (disambiguation)
