= 126 (number) =

← 125	126	127 →
- ← 120 121 122 123 124 125 126 127 128 129 →: List of numbers; Integers; ← 0 100 200 300 400 500 600 700 800 900 →
- Cardinal: one hundred twenty-six
- Ordinal: 126th (one hundred twenty-sixth)
- Factorization: 2 × 3^{2} × 7
- Divisors: 1, 2, 3, 6, 7, 9, 14, 18, 21, 42, 63, 126
- Greek numeral: ΡΚϚ´
- Roman numeral: CXXVI, cxxvi
- Binary: 1111110_{2}
- Ternary: 11200_{3}
- Senary: 330_{6}
- Octal: 176_{8}
- Duodecimal: A6_{12}
- Hexadecimal: 7E_{16}

126 (one hundred [and] twenty-six) is the natural number following 125 and preceding 127.

== In mathematics ==
As the binomial coefficient $\tbinom{9}{4}$, 126 is a central binomial coefficient, and in Pascal's Triangle, it is a pentatope number. 126 is a sum of two cubes, and since 125 + 1 is σ_{3}(5), 126 is the fifth value of the sum of cubed divisors function.

126 is the fifth $\mathcal{S}$-perfect Granville number, and the third such not to be a perfect number. Also, it is known to be the smallest Granville number with three distinct prime factors, and perhaps the only such Granville number.

126 is a pentagonal pyramidal number and a decagonal number. 126 is also the different number of ways to partition a decagon into even polygons by diagonals, and the number of crossing points among the diagonals of a regular nonagon.

There are exactly 126 binary strings of length seven that are not repetitions of a shorter string, and 126 different semigroups on four elements (up to isomorphism and reversal).

There are exactly 126 positive integers that are not solutions of the equation

$$x=abc+abd+acd+bcd,$$

where a, b, c, and d must themselves all be positive integers.

126 is the number of root vectors of simple Lie group E_{7}.

126 = 6 × 21, making it a Friedman number.

== In physics ==
126 is the seventh magic number in nuclear physics. For each of these numbers, 2, 8, 20, 28, 50, 82, and 126, an atomic nucleus with this many protons is or is predicted to be more stable than for other numbers. Thus, although there has been no experimental discovery of element 126, tentatively called unbihexium, it is predicted to belong to an island of stability that might allow it to exist with a long enough half life that its existence could be detected.
