= 118 =

118 may refer to:

- 118 (number), the natural number following 117 and preceding 119
- AD 118
- 118 BC
- 118 Mall, shopping mall in Kuala Lumpur, Malaysia
- 118 (TV series)
- 118 (film)
- 118 (Tees) Corps Engineer Regiment
- 118 (Tees) Field Squadron, Royal Engineers
- 118 Peitho, a main-belt asteroid

== See also ==
- 11/8 (disambiguation)
- Oganesson, synthetic chemical element with atomic number 118
