= 115 =

115 may refer to:

- 115 (number), the natural number following 114 and preceding 116
- AD 115, a year in the 2nd century AD
- 115 BC, a year in the 2nd century BC
- 115 (Hampshire Fortress) Corps Engineer Regiment, Royal Engineers, a unit in the UK Territorial Army
- 115 (Leicestershire) Field Park Squadron, Royal Engineers, a unit in the UK Territorial Army
- 115 (New Jersey bus)
- 115 (barge), a whaleback barge
- The homeless emergency telephone number in France
- 115 Thyra, a main-belt asteroid

11/5 may refer to:

- 11/5, an American hip hop group from San Francisco, California
- November 5 (month–day date notation)
- May 11 (day–month date notation)
- {11/5}, a type of regular hendecagram

1/15 may refer to:

- January 15 (month–day date notation)

== See also ==
- Moscovium, synthetic chemical element with atomic number 115
