= 11/8 =

11/8 may refer to:

- A time signature e.g.: "The Eleven" by the Grateful Dead
- November 8 (month-day date notation)
- August 11 (day-month date notation)
- 11 shillings and 8 pence in UK predecimal currency

== See also ==
- 118 (disambiguation)
- 8/11 (disambiguation)
