= 1234567890 =

1234567890 or 0123456789 (a series containing each digit of the Arabic numerals) may represent:

- An example of a pandigital number
- Millisecond 1234567890, a moment in Unix time celebrated in the year 2009

== See also ==
- Numeral system, any writing system for expressing numbers
- QWERTY, a keyboard layout
