= 343 (number) =

← 342	343	344 →
- List of numbers; Integers; ← 0 100 200 300 400 500 600 700 800 900 →
- Cardinal: three hundred forty-three
- Ordinal: 343rd (three hundred forty-third)
- Factorization: 7^{3}
- Divisors: 1, 7, 49, 343
- Greek numeral: ΤΜΓ´
- Roman numeral: CCCXLIII, cccxliii
- Binary: 101010111_{2}
- Ternary: 110201_{3}
- Senary: 1331_{6}
- Octal: 527_{8}
- Duodecimal: 247_{12}
- Hexadecimal: 157_{16}

343 (three hundred [and] forty three) is the natural number following 342 and preceding 344.

== In mathematics ==
343 factorization is 7^{3} (7 × 7 × 7) meaning it is a cubic number. It is also a powerful number, and an economical number.

343 is the first nice Friedman number that is composite since 343 = (3 + 4)^{3}. It is the only known example of x^{2}+x+1 = y^{3}, in this case, x=18, y=7. It is z^{3} in a triplet (x,y,z) such that x^{5} + y^{2} = z^{3}. It is also a strong Friedman number.

Since 343 reversed is 343, it is a palindrome number. Since it is also an economical number, it is the smallest economical palindrome.

== In other fields ==
On September 11, 2001, By 10:28 a.m. (ET), the South Tower and North Tower of the World Trade Center in New York collapsed. Because of that, a total of 343 FDNY Members died from the emergency. 341 Firefighters & 2 Paramedics.

The Woodside Cotton Mill Village Historic District contains a total of 343 surviving mill houses.
