= 107 (number) =

← 106	107	108 →
- ← 100 101 102 103 104 105 106 107 108 109 →: List of numbers; Integers; ← 0 100 200 300 400 500 600 700 800 900 →
- Cardinal: one hundred seven
- Ordinal: 107th (one hundred seventh)
- Factorization: prime
- Prime: 28th
- Divisors: 1, 107
- Greek numeral: ΡΖ´
- Roman numeral: CVII, cvii
- Binary: 1101011_{2}
- Ternary: 10222_{3}
- Senary: 255_{6}
- Octal: 153_{8}
- Duodecimal: 8B_{12}
- Hexadecimal: 6B_{16}

107 (one hundred [and] seven) is the natural number following 106 and preceding 108.

== In mathematics ==
107 is the 28th prime number. The next prime is 109, with which it comprises a twin prime, making 107 a Chen prime.

Plugged into the expression $2^p - 1$, 107 yields 162259276829213363391578010288127, a Mersenne prime. 107 is itself a safe prime.

It is the fourth Busy beaver number, the maximum number of steps that any Turing machine with 2 symbols and 4 states can make before eventually halting.

It is the number of triangle-free graphs on 7 vertices.

It is the ninth emirp, because reversing its digits gives another prime number (701)

== In sports ==
The 107% rule is a Formula One Sporting Regulation in operation from 1996 to 2002 and 2011 onward.

The number 107 is also associated with the Timbers Army supporters group of the Portland Timbers soccer team, in reference to the stadium seating section where the group originally congregated.
