= 109 =

109 may refer to:

- 109 (number), the natural number following 108 and preceding 110
- AD 109, a year of the Julian calendar, in the second century AD
- 109 BC, a year of the pre-Julian Roman calendar
- 109 (department store), a department store in Shibuya, Tokyo, Japan
- Route 109 (MBTA), a bus route in Massachusetts, US
- Messerschmitt Bf 109, a German World War II fighter plane
- M109 howitzer, an American self-propelled howitzer
- 109 Felicitas, a main-belt asteroid

== See also ==
- 10/9 (disambiguation)
- Meitnerium, synthetic chemical element with atomic number 109
