= 108 (number) =

← 107	108	109 →
- ← 100 101 102 103 104 105 106 107 108 109 →: List of numbers; Integers; ← 0 100 200 300 400 500 600 700 800 900 →
- Cardinal: one hundred eight
- Ordinal: 108th (one hundred eighth)
- Factorization: 2^{2} × 3^{3}
- Divisors: 1, 2, 3, 4, 6, 9, 12, 18, 27, 36, 54, 108
- Greek numeral: ΡΗ´
- Roman numeral: CVIII, cviii
- Binary: 1101100_{2}
- Ternary: 11000_{3}
- Senary: 300_{6}
- Octal: 154_{8}
- Duodecimal: 90_{12}
- Hexadecimal: 6C_{16}

108 (one hundred [and] eight) is the natural number following 107 and preceding 109.

== In mathematics ==
108 is an abundant number, a self number, a semiperfect number and a tetranacci number. It is a Harshad number in bases 2, 3, 4, 6, 7, 9, 10, 11, 12, 13 and 16. 108 is a powerful number but not a perfect power, making it an Achilles number. 108 is divisible by the number of divisors it has, 12, making it a refactorable number. 108 is a largely composite number because it has 12 divisors and no smaller number has more than 12 divisors. 108 is palindromic in bases 11 (99_{11}), 17 (66_{17}), 26 (44_{26}), 35 (33_{35}) and 53 (22_{53}).

108 is the hyperfactorial of 3 since 108=$1^1 \cdot 2^2 \cdot 3^3$.

108 is divisible by the value of its φ function, which is 36.

There are 108 degrees in an interior angle of a regular pentagon in Euclidean space.

There are 108 free polyominoes of order 7.

The equation $2\sin\left(\frac{108^\circ}{2}\right) = \phi$ results in the golden ratio.

This could be restated as saying that the "chord" of 108 degrees is $\phi$, the golden ratio.

== Religion and the arts ==
The number 108 is considered sacred by the Dharmic religions, such as Hinduism, Buddhism, and Jainism.

=== Hinduism ===
In Hindu tradition, the Mukhya Shivaganas (attendants of Shiva) are 108 in number and hence Shaiva religions, particularly Lingayats, use malas of 108 beads for prayer and meditation.

Similarly, in Gaudiya Vaishnavism, Lord Krishna in Brindavan had 108 followers known as gopis. Recital of their names, often accompanied by the counting of a 108-beaded mala, is often done during religious ceremonies.

The Sri Vaishnavite Tradition has 108 Divya Desams (temples of Vishnu) that are revered by the 12 Alvars in the Divya Prabandha, a collection of 4,000 Tamil verses. There are also 108 Shakta pithas (sacred places).

The Sudarshana Chakra is a spinning, discus weapon with 108 serrated edges, generally portrayed on the right rear hand of the four hands of Vishnu.

The Sri Yantra contains 108 points.

The total number of Upanishads is 108 as per Muktikā canon.

=== Jainism ===
In Jainism, the total number of ways of Karma influx (Aasrav). 4 Kashays (anger, pride, conceit, greed) x 3 karanas (mind, speech, bodily action) x 3 stages of planning (planning, procurement, commencement) x 3 ways of execution (own action, getting it done, supporting or approval of action).

=== Buddhism ===
In Theravada Buddhism, according to Bhante Gunaratana this number is reached by multiplying the senses smell, touch, taste, hearing, sight, and consciousness by whether they are painful, pleasant or neutral, and then again by whether these are internally generated or externally occurring, and yet again by past, present and future, finally we get 108 feelings. 6 × 3 × 2 × 3 = 108. Thus, the number 108 represents all the possible sensory states that one could experience.

Tibetan Buddhist malas or rosaries (Tib. ཕྲེང་བ Wyl. phreng ba, "Trengwa" ) are usually 108 beads; sometimes 111 including the guru bead(s), reflecting the words of the Buddha called in Tibetan the Kangyur (Wylie: Bka'-'gyur) in 108 volumes. Zen priests wear juzu (a ring of prayer beads) around their wrists, which consists of 108 beads.

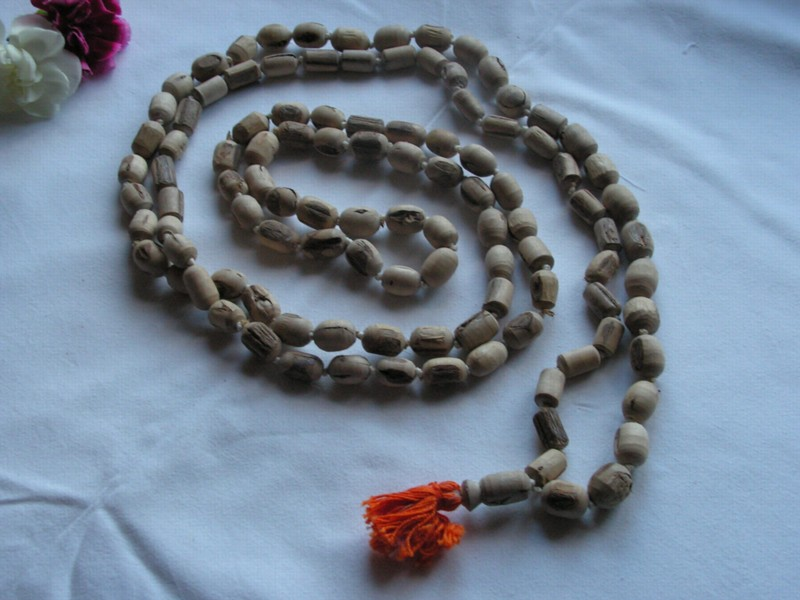
Japa mala, or japa beads, made from tulasi wood, consisting of 108 beads plus the head bead

The Lankavatara Sutra has a section where the Bodhisattva Mahamati asks The Buddha 108 questions and another section where The Buddha lists 108 statements of negation in the form of "A statement concerning X is not a statement concerning X." In a footnote, D.T. Suzuki explains that the Sanskrit word translated as "statement" is pada which can also mean "foot-step" or "a position". This confusion over the word "pada" explains why some have mistakenly held that the reference to 108 statements in the Lankavatara refer to the 108 steps that many temples have.

In Japan, at the end of the year, a bell is chimed 108 times in Buddhist temples to finish the old year and welcome the new one (Joya no Kane (除夜の鐘)). Each ring represents one of 108 earthly temptations (Bonnō) a person must overcome to achieve nirvana.

=== Other references ===
In Rosicrucianism, especially as taught today by AMORC, the Rosicrucian Order alternates between 108-year cycles of public activity and dormancy.

Roman Catholic tradition holds that Romans delivered 108 blows to the stomach during the Passion of Jesus on the Cross.

In the neo-Gnostic teachings of Samael Aun Weor, an individual has 108 chances (lifetimes) to eliminate his egos and transcend the material world before "devolving" and having the egos forcefully removed in the infradimensions.

Once Odysseus returns home in the Odyssey, his son Telemachus tells him that there are 108 suitors of his wife, Penelope.

In the Chinese classic Water Margin there are 108 outlaws.

American hardcore band 108.

== Martial arts ==
Many East Asian martial arts trace their roots back to Buddhism, specifically, to the Buddhist Shaolin Temple. Because of their ties to Buddhism, 108 has become an important symbolic number in a number of martial arts styles.

- According to Marma Adi and Ayurveda, there are 108 pressure points in the body, where consciousness and flesh intersect to give life to the living being.
- The Chinese school of martial arts agrees with the Indian school of martial arts on the principle of 108 pressure points.
- 108 number figures prominently in the symbolism associated with karate, particularly the Gōjū-ryū discipline. The ultimate Gōjū-ryū kata, Suparinpei, literally translates to 108. Suparinpei derives from the Chinese Foochow language pronunciation of the number 108, while gojūshi of Gojūshiho is the Japanese pronunciation of the number 54. The other Gōjū-ryū kata, Sanseru (meaning "36") and Seipai ("18") are factors of the number 108.
- The 108 moves of the Yang Taijiquan long form and 108 moves in the Wing Chun wooden dummy form, taught by Ip Man, are noted in this regard.
- The Eagle Claw Kung Fu style has a form known as the 108 Locking Hand Techniques. This form is considered the essence of the style, consisting of an encyclopedia of Chin Na techniques, and is said to be passed down from the founder General Yue Fei.
- Paek Pal Ki Hyung, the 7th form taught in the art of Kuk Sool Won, translates literally to "108 technique" form. It is also frequently referred to as the "eliminate 108 torments" form. Each motion corresponds with one of the 108 Buddhist torments or defilements.
- In the Cambodian martial art of Bokator, there are 108 kbach in gates 1 through 8 of the hand-to-hand combat techniques.
- There 108 defense combinations that are considered canon in Shaolin Kempo Karate.

== In sports ==
- 108 is the number that the Belgian cyclist Wouter Weylandt wore when he crashed fatally in the Giro d'Italia on May 9, 2011. As a tribute, many supporters held replicas of his race number by the side of the road the next day. The organization of the Giro d'Italia decided not to issue race number 108 in future editions, to commemorate him.
- 108 is the number of double stitches on a regulation baseball
- 108 is the number of years it took for the Chicago Cubs of Major League Baseball to win their first World Series championship (2016) since the 1908 season.
