= Pandigital number =

Integer whose representation contains every digit in its number base

In mathematics, a pandigital number is an integer that in a given base has among its significant digits each digit used in the base at least once. For example, 1234567890 (one billion two hundred thirty-four million five hundred sixty-seven thousand eight hundred ninety) is a pandigital number in base 10.

== Smallest pandigital numbers ==
The first few pandigital base 10 numbers are (sequence A171102 in the OEIS):

1023456789, 1023456798, 1023456879, 1023456897, 1023456978, 1023456987, 1023457689

The smallest pandigital number in a given base b is an integer of the form

$$b^{b - 1} + \sum_{d = 2}^{b - 1} db^{b - 1 - d} = \frac{b^b - b}{(b-1)^2} + (b-1) \times b^{b-2} - 1$$

The following table lists the smallest pandigital numbers of a few selected bases:

Base	Smallest pandigital	Value in base 10
1	1	1
2	10	2
3	102	11
4	1023	75
5	10234	694
6	102345	8345
8	10234567	2177399
10	1023456789	1023456789
12	1023456789AB	754777787027
16	1023456789ABCDEF	1162849439785405935
36	1023456789ABCDEFGHIJKLMNOPQRSTUVWXYZ	2959962226643665039859858867133882191922999717199870715

As well as some other numeral systems:

System	Smallest pandigital	Value in base 10
Roman numerals	MCDXLIV	1444
Hebrew numerals	אבגדהוזחטיכלמנסעפצקרשתךםןףץ	4995

OEIS: A049363 gives the base 10 values for the first 18 bases.

In a trivial sense, all positive integers are pandigital in unary (or tallying). In binary, all integers are pandigital except for 0 and numbers of the form $2^n - 1$ (the Mersenne numbers). The larger the base, the rarer pandigital numbers become, though one can always find runs of $b^x$ consecutive pandigital numbers with redundant digits by writing all the digits of the base together (but not putting the zero first as the most significant digit) and adding x + 1 zeroes at the end as least significant digits.

Conversely, the smaller the base, $b$, the fewer pandigital numbers without redundant digits there are. 2 is the only such pandigital number in base 2, while there are more of these in base 10. The formula is $(b-1)(b-1)!$.

== Variants and properties ==
Sometimes, the term is used to refer only to pandigital numbers with no redundant digits. In some cases, a number might be called pandigital even if it does not have a zero as a significant digit, for example, 923456781 (these are also referred to as "penholodigital" or "zeroless pandigital numbers").

No base 10 pandigital number can be a prime number if it doesn't have redundant digits. The sum of the digits 0 to 9 is 45, passing the divisibility rule for both 3 and 9. The first base 10 pandigital prime is 10123457689; OEIS: A050288 lists more.

For reasons of symmetry, redundant digits are also required for a pandigital number (in any base except unary) to also be a palindromic number in that base. The smallest pandigital palindromic number in base 10 is 1023456789876543201.

The largest pandigital number without redundant digits to be also a square number is 9814072356 = 99066^{2}.

Two of the zeroless pandigital Friedman numbers are: 123456789 = ((86 + 2 × 7)^{5} − 91) / 3^{4}, and 987654321 = (8 × (97 + 6/2)^{5} + 1) / 3^{4}.

A pandigital Friedman number without redundant digits is the square: 2170348569 = 46587^{2} + (0 × 139).

The concept of a "pandigital approximation" was introduced by Erich Friedman in 2004. With the digits from 1 to 9 (each used exactly once) and the mathematical symbols + − × / ( ) . and ^, Euler's number e can be approximated as $(1+9^{-4^{7\times 6}})^{3^{2^{85}}}$, which is correct to $1.8\cdot10^{25}$ decimal places. The variant $(1+.2^{9^{7\times 6}})^{5^{3^{84}}}$ produces $8.3\cdot10^{39}$ correct digits.

While much of what has been said does not apply to Roman numerals, there are pandigital numbers: MCDXLIV, MCDXLVI, MCDLXIV, MCDLXVI, MDCXLIV, MDCXLVI, MDCLXIV, MDCLXVI. These, listed in OEIS: A105416, use each of the characters just once, while OEIS: A105417 has pandigital Roman numerals with repeats.

Pandigital numbers are useful in fiction and in advertising. The Social Security number 987-65-4321 is a zeroless pandigital number reserved for use in advertising. Some credit card companies use pandigital numbers with redundant digits as fictitious credit card numbers (while others use strings of zeroes).

== Arithmetic properties ==
Several arithmetic properties of pandigital numbers have been studied, in particular regarding divisibility and prime factorization.

There are 244,423 cases in which a pandigital number is an integer multiple of another pandigital number. These frequently form multiplication chains consisting of several successive steps, with identical or different factors. Among these, 6,760 pandigital numbers initiate a chain with at least two steps, and 68 initiate a chain with three steps. None of these 68 chains with three multiplication steps overlap, meaning that a pandigital number can have at most three other pandigital numbers as divisors.

The smallest prime number that is not a divisor of any pandigital number is 111,119. However, some larger prime numbers do occur as divisors of pandigital numbers.

The largest prime divisor of a pandigital number is 1,097,393,447; multiplied by 9, it yields the pandigital number 9,876,541,023.

As a counterpart of that, there are three pandigital numbers whose prime factorizations consist exclusively of powers of one-digit primes (2, 3, 5, and 7):

- 3.891.240.675 = 3^{3} * 5^{2} * 7^{8}
- 6.195.732.480 = 2^{13} * 3^{2} * 5 * 7^{5}
- 9.487.215.360 = 2^{8} * 3^{2} * 5 * 7^{7}
  - Despite being among the largest 0–9 pandigital numbers, its prime factorization consists exclusively of the smallest possible prime numbers (2, 3, 5 and 7)
  - By comparison, the prime factorization of the smallest 0–9 pandigital number, 1,023,456,789, 3^{4} * 2221 * 5689, includes two four-digit prime factors

The largest pandigital number whose prime factorization consists exclusively of primes below 100 is

- 9,876,523,104 = 2^{5} · 3^{5} · 7^{4} · 23^{2}.
  - Its difference from the largest possible pandigital number, 9,876,543,210, is only 20,106.
  - Only 55 other pandigital numbers lie between the two values
  - It is therefore the 57th-largest 0–9 pandigital number

In total, there are 87 pandigital square numbers. No pandigital cube and no pandigital number with an integer root of higher degree are known.

For each natural number n, there exists a maximum exponent k such that n^{k} divides at least one pandigital number, while n^{k+1} does not divide any.

For example, three pandigital numbers are divisible by 2^{21}, but none by 2^{22}:

- 3.076.521.984 = 2^{21} * 3^{2} * 163
- 3.718.250.496 = 2^{21} * 3^{2} * 197
- 6.398.410.752 = 2^{21} * 3^{3} * 113

With respect to 3, only one pandigital number is divisible by 3^{15}, and none by 3^{16}:

- 7.246.198.035 = 3^{15} * 5 * 101

Analogously, only one pandigital number is divisible by 5^{9}, while 5^{10} does not occur:

- 9.123.046.875 = 3^{3} * 5^{9} * 173

This behavior extends to other integers. For example, 13 pandigital numbers are divisible by 6^{8}, whereas 6^{9} does not occur as a divisor of any pandigital number.

For 7, the highest power is 7^{8} , represented by:

- 3.891.240.675 = 3^{3} * 5^{2} * 7^{8}
  - Beside 7, this one consists only of powers of 3 and 5.

The three named cases divisible by 2^{21} also represent 4^{10} and 8^{7} as the highest power concerning 4 and 8 which are powers of 2.

Nine pandigital numbers are divisible by 9^{7} = 3^{14}, among them the named one divisible by 3^{15}

== Computational procedure ==
The values were determined computationally by Artificial intelligence. Depending on the parameters, the search does not require examining all 3,265,920 pandigital numbers. Instead, only numbers satisfying the relevant mathematical constraints (such as prescribed prime factorizations or high powers of specific primes) are generated, after which they are tested for pandigitality.

== Examples in base 10 ==
- 123456789 = The first zeroless pandigital number.
- 381654729 = The only zeroless pandigital number where the first n digits are divisible by n.
- 987654321 = The largest zeroless pandigital number without redundant digits.
- 1023456789 = The first pandigital number.
- 1234567890 = The pandigital number with the digits in order.
- 3816547290 = The polydivisible pandigital number; the only pandigital number where the first n digits are divisible by n.
- 9814072356 = The largest pandigital square without redundant digits. It is the square of 99066.
- 9876543210 = The largest pandigital number without redundant digits.
- 12345678987654321 = A pandigital number with all the digits except zero in both ascending and descending order. It is the square of 111111111; see Demlo number. It is also a palindromic number.

== See also ==
- Champernowne constant
- Pangram, a word (or a sentence) using every letters A to Z at least once.
