= Multiply perfect number =

Number whose divisors add to a multiple of that number

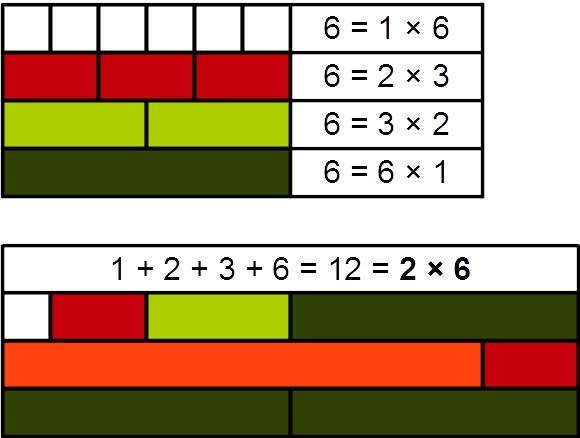
Demonstration, with Cuisenaire rods, of the 2-perfection of the number 6

In mathematics, a multiply perfect number (also called multiperfect number or pluperfect number) is a generalization of a perfect number.

For a given natural number k, a number n is called k-perfect (or k-fold perfect) if the sum of all positive divisors of n (the divisor function, σ(n)) is equal to kn; a number is thus perfect if and only if it is 2-perfect. A number that is k-perfect for a certain k is called a multiply perfect number. As of 2026, k-perfect numbers are known to exist for each value of k up to 11.

It is unknown whether there are any odd multiply perfect numbers other than 1. The first few multiply perfect numbers are:

1, 6, 28, 120, 496, 672, 8128, 30240, 32760, 523776, 2178540, 23569920, 33550336, 45532800, 142990848, 459818240, 14182439040, 4364925090, 8589869056 ... (sequence A007691 in the OEIS).

== Example ==
The sum of the divisors of 120 is

1 + 2 + 3 + 4 + 5 + 6 + 8 + 10 + 12 + 15 + 20 + 24 + 30 + 40 + 60 + 120 = 360

which is 3 × 120. Therefore 120 is a 3-perfect number.

== Smallest known k-perfect numbers ==
The following table gives an overview of the smallest known k-perfect numbers for k ≤ 11 (sequence A007539 in the OEIS):

k	Smallest k-perfect number	Factors	Found by
1	1		ancient
2	6	2 × 3	ancient
3	120	2^{3} × 3 × 5	ancient
4	30240	2^{5} × 3^{3} × 5 × 7	René Descartes, circa 1638
5	14182439040	2^{7} × 3^{4} × 5 × 7 × 11^{2} × 17 × 19	René Descartes, circa 1638
6	154345556085770649600 (21 digits)	2^{15} × 3^{5} × 5^{2} × 7^{2} × 11 × 13 × 17 × 19 × 31 × 43 × 257	Robert Daniel Carmichael, 1907
7	141310897947438348259849...523264343544818565120000 (57 digits)	2^{32} × 3^{11} × 5^{4} × 7^{5} × 11^{2} × 13^{2} × 17 × 19^{3} × 23 × 31 × 37 × 43 × 61 × 71 × 73 × 89 × 181 × 2141 × 599479	TE Mason, 1911
8	826809968707776137289924...057256213348352000000000 (133 digits)	2^{62} × 3^{15} × 5^{9} × 7^{7} × 11^{3} × 13^{3} × 17^{2} × 19 × 23 × 29 × ... × 487 × 521^{2} × 601 × 1201 × 1279 × 2557 × 3169 × 5113 × 92737 × 649657 (38 distinct prime factors)	Stephen F. Gretton, 1990
9	561308081837371589999987...415685343739904000000000 (287 digits)	2^{104} × 3^{43} × 5^{9} × 7^{12} × 11^{6} × 13^{4} × 17 × 19^{4} × 23^{2} × 29 × ... × 17351 × 29191 × 30941 × 45319 × 106681 × 110563 × 122921 × 152041 × 570461 × 16148168401 (66 distinct prime factors)	Fred Helenius, 1995
10	448565429898310924320164...000000000000000000000000 (639 digits)	2^{175} × 3^{69} × 5^{29} × 7^{18} × 11^{19} × 13^{8} × 17^{9} × 19^{7} × 23^{9} × 29^{3} × ... × 583367 × 1609669 × 3500201 × 119782433 × 212601841 × 2664097031 × 2931542417 × 43872038849 × 374857981681 × 4534166740403 (115 distinct prime factors)	George Woltman, 2013
11	312633142338546946283331...000000000000000000000000 (1739 digits)	2^{413} × 3^{145} × 5^{73} × 7^{49} × 11^{27} × 13^{22} × 17^{11} × 19^{13} × 23^{10} × 29^{9} × ... × 31280679788951 × 42166482463639 × 45920153384867 × 9460375336977361 × 18977800907065531 × 79787519018560501 × 455467221769572743 × 2519545342349331183143 × 38488154120055537150068589763279 × 6113142872404227834840443898241613032969 (241 distinct prime factors)	George Woltman, 2022

== Properties ==
It can be proven that:

- For a given prime number p, if n is p-perfect and p does not divide n, then pn is (p + 1)-perfect. This implies that an integer n is a 3-perfect number divisible by 2 but not by 4, if and only if n/2 is an odd perfect number, of which none are known.
- If 3n is 4k-perfect and 3 does not divide n, then n is 3k-perfect.

== Odd multiply perfect numbers ==
Unsolved problem in mathematics
Are there any odd multiply perfect numbers other than 1?
More unsolved problems in mathematics

It is unknown whether there are any odd multiply perfect numbers other than 1. However if an odd k-perfect number n exists where k > 2, then it must satisfy the following conditions:

- The largest prime factor is ≥ 100129
- The second largest prime factor is ≥ 1009
- The third largest prime factor is ≥ 101

If an odd triperfect number exists, it must be greater than 10^{128}.

Tóth found several numbers that would be odd multiperfect, if one of their factors was a square. An example is 8999757, which would be an odd multiperfect number, if only one of its prime factors, 61, was a square. This is closely related to the concept of Descartes numbers.

== Bounds ==
In little-o notation, the number of multiply perfect numbers less than x is $o(x^\varepsilon)$ for all ε > 0.

The number of k-perfect numbers n for n ≤ x is less than $cx^{c'\log\log\log x/\log\log x}$, where c and c' are constants independent of k.

Under the assumption of the Riemann hypothesis, the following inequality is true for all k-perfect numbers n, where k > 3

$$\log\log n > k\cdot e^{-\gamma}$$

where $\gamma$ is Euler's gamma constant. This can be proven using Robin's theorem.

The number of divisors τ(n) of a k-perfect number n, where k > 2, satisfies the inequality

$$\tau(n) > e^{k - \gamma}.$$

The number of distinct prime factors ω(n) of n satisfies

$$\omega(n) \ge k^2-1, ~~ \text{if }n\text{ is odd}$$
$$\omega(n) \ge k^2/4, ~~ \text{if }n\text{ is even}$$

If the distinct prime factors of n are $p_1, p_2, \ldots, p_r$, then:

$$r \left(\sqrt[r]{3/2} - 1\right) < \sum_{i=1}^{r} \frac{1}{p_i} < r \left(1 - \sqrt[r]{6/(k\pi^2)}\right), ~~ \text{if }n\text{ is even}$$
$$r \left(\sqrt[3r]{k^2} - 1\right) < \sum_{i=1}^{r} \frac{1}{p_i} < r \left(1 - \sqrt[r]{8/(k\pi^2)}\right), ~~ \text{if }n\text{ is odd}$$

== Specific values of k ==
=== Perfect numbers ===
A number n with σ(n) = 2n is perfect.

=== Triperfect numbers ===
A number n with σ(n) = 3n is triperfect. There are only six known triperfect numbers and these are believed to comprise all such numbers:

120, 672, 523776, 459818240, 1476304896, 51001180160 (sequence A005820 in the OEIS)

If there exists an odd perfect number m (a famous open problem) then 2m would be 3-perfect, since σ(2m) = σ(2)σ(m) = 3×2m. An odd triperfect number must be a square number exceeding 10^{70} and have at least 12 distinct prime factors, the largest exceeding 10^{5}.

== Variations ==
=== Unitary multiply perfect numbers ===
A similar extension can be made for unitary perfect numbers. A positive integer n is called a unitary multi k-perfect number if σ^{*}(n) = kn where σ^{*}(n) is the sum of its unitary divisors. A unitary multiply perfect number is a unitary multi k-perfect number for some positive integer k. A unitary multi 2-perfect number is also called a unitary perfect number.

In the case k > 2, no example of a unitary multi k-perfect number is yet known. It is known that if such a number exists, it must be even and greater than 10^{102} and must have at least 45 odd prime factors.

The first few unitary multiply perfect numbers are:

1, 6, 60, 90, 87360 (sequence A327158 in the OEIS)

=== Bi-unitary multiply perfect numbers ===
A positive integer n is called a bi-unitary multi k-perfect number if σ^{**}(n) = kn where σ^{**}(n) is the sum of its bi-unitary divisors. A bi-unitary multiply perfect number is a bi-unitary multi k-perfect number for some positive integer k. A bi-unitary multi 2-perfect number is also called a bi-unitary perfect number, and a bi-unitary multi 3-perfect number is called a bi-unitary triperfect number.

In 1987, Peter Hagis proved that there are no odd bi-unitary multiperfect numbers other than 1.

In 2020, Haukkanen and Sitaramaiah studied bi-unitary triperfect numbers of the form 2^{a}u where u is odd. They completely resolved the cases 1 ≤ a ≤ 6 and a = 8, and partially resolved the case a = 7.

In 2024, Tomohiro Yamada proved that 2160 is the only bi-unitary triperfect number divisible by 27 = 3^{3}. This means that Yamada found all biunitary triperfect numbers of the form 3^{a}u with 3 ≤ a and u not divisible by 3.

The first few bi-unitary multiply perfect numbers are:

1, 6, 60, 90, 120, 672, 2160, 10080, 22848, 30240 (sequence A189000 in the OEIS)

== See also ==
- Hemiperfect number
