= 116 =

116 (one hundred and sixteen) may refer to:

- 116 (number), the natural number following 115 and preceding 117
- AD 116
- 116 BC
- 116 (Devon and Cornwall) Engineer Regiment, Royal Engineers, a military unit
- Route 116 (MBTA), a bus route in Massachusetts, US
- 116 (hip hop group), a Christian hip hop collective
- 116 emergency telephone number
- 116 helplines in Europe
- Route 116, see list of highways numbered 116
- 116 Sirona, a main-belt asteroid

== See also ==
- 11/6 (disambiguation)
- Livermorium, synthetic chemical element with atomic number 116
