= 106 =

106 may refer to:

- 106 (number), the natural number following 105 and preceding 107
- AD 106, a year in the 2nd century AD
- 106 BC, a year in the 2nd century BC
- 106 (emergency telephone number), an Australian emergency number
- Route 106 (MBTA), a bus route in Massachusetts, US
- 106 Dione, a main-belt asteroid
- Peugeot 106, a hatchback

10/6 may refer to:

- October 6 (month-day date notation)
- June 10 (day-month date notation)
- 10 shillings and 6 pence in UK pre-decimal currency
  - The value of the half guinea in pre-decimal shillings and pence
  - 10/6, the price tag on the hat of the Hatter in Alice's Adventures in Wonderland

== See also ==
- 1/6 (disambiguation), for uses of "1/06"
- Seaborgium, chemical element with atomic number 106
