= Octonaire =

French music during the Renaissance

The Octonaire is a genre of early French poem, then chanson, with the text divided into eight-verse sections, or octonaries, after the model of Psalm 118.

Three poets wrote Octonaires de la vanité et inconstance du monde. The best known was Antoine de la Roche Chandieu. Claude Le Jeune and Paschal de L'Estocart both wrote collections of moral chansons, Octonaires de la vanité et inconstance du monde, with 19 texts common to both collections.
