= 11/6 =

11/6 may refer to:

- November 6 (month-day date notation)
- June 11 (day-month date notation)
- 11 shillings and 6 pence in UK predecimal currency

== See also ==
- 116 (disambiguation)
- 6/11 (disambiguation)
