= Maris–McGwire–Sosa pair =

In recreational mathematics, Maris–McGwire–Sosa pairs (MMS pairs, also MMS numbers) (sequence A045759 in the OEIS) are two consecutive natural numbers such that adding each number's digits (in base 10) to the digits of its prime factorization gives the same sum.

Thus 61 → 6 + 1 (the sum of its digits) + 6 + 1 (since 61 is its prime factorization)
and 62 → 6 + 2 (the sum of its digits) + 3 + 1 + 2 (since 31 × 2 is its prime factorization).

The above two sums are equal (= 14), so 61 and 62 form an MMS pair.

MMS pairs are so named because in 1998 the baseball players Mark McGwire and Sammy Sosa both hit their 62nd home runs for the season, passing the old record of 61, held by Roger Maris. American engineer Mike Keith noticed this property of these numbers and named pairs of numbers like these MMS pairs.

== See also ==
- Ruth–Aaron pair
