= 6/11 =

6/11 may refer to:

- June 11 (month-day date notation)
- November 6 (day-month date notation)
- The fraction equal to approximately 0.545454

== See also ==
- 11/6 (disambiguation)
