= Hemiperfect number =

Number with a half-integer abundancy index

In number theory, a hemiperfect number is a positive integer with a half-integer abundancy index. In other words, σ(n)/n = k/2 for an odd integer k, where σ(n) is the sum-of-divisors function, the sum of all positive divisors of n.

The first few hemiperfect numbers are:

2, 24, 4320, 4680, 26208, 8910720, 17428320, 20427264, 91963648, 197064960, ... (sequence A159907 in the OEIS)

== Example ==
24 is a hemiperfect number because the sum of the divisors of 24 is

1 + 2 + 3 + 4 + 6 + 8 + 12 + 24 = 60 = 5/2 × 24.

The abundancy index is 5/2 which is a half-integer.

== Smallest hemiperfect numbers of abundancy k/2 ==
The following table gives an overview of the smallest hemiperfect numbers of abundancy k/2 for k ≤ 13 (sequence A088912 in the OEIS):

| k | Smallest number of abundancy k/2 | Number of digits |
|---|---|---|
| 3 | 2 | 1 |
| 5 | 24 | 2 |
| 7 | 4320 | 4 |
| 9 | 8910720 | 7 |
| 11 | 17116004505600 | 14 |
| 13 | 170974031122008628879954060917200710847692800 | 45 |

The current best known upper bounds for the smallest numbers of abundancy 15/2 and 17/2 were found by Michel Marcus.

The smallest known number of abundancy 15/2 is ≈ 1.274947×10^{88}, and the smallest known number of abundancy 17/2 is ≈ 2.717290×10^{190}.

There are no known numbers of abundancy 19/2.

== See also ==
- Semiperfect number
- Perfect number
- Multiply perfect number
