= 114 =

114 may refer to:

- 114 (number), the natural number following 113 and preceding 115
- AD 114
- 114 BC
- 114 (1st London) Army Engineer Regiment, Royal Engineers, an English military unit
- 114 (Antrim Artillery) Field Squadron, Royal Engineers, a Northern Irish military unit
- Route 114 (MBTA), a bus route in Massachusetts, US
- 114 (New Jersey bus)
- 114 Kassandra, a main-belt asteroid

== See also ==
- 11/4 (disambiguation)
- Flerovium, synthetic chemical element with atomic number 114
