= Icosahedral number =

Figurate number representing an icosahedron

In mathematics, an icosahedral number is a figurate number that represents an icosahedron. The nth icosahedral number is given by the formula

$${n(5n^2-5n+2) \over 2}$$.

The first such numbers are: 1, 12, 48, 124, 255, 456, 742, 1128, 1629, 2260, 3036, 3972, 5083, … (sequence A006564 in the OEIS).

== History ==
The first study of icosahedral numbers appears to have been by René Descartes, around 1630, in his De solidorum elementis. Prior to Descartes, figurate numbers had been studied by the ancient Greeks and by Johann Faulhaber, but only for polygonal numbers, pyramidal numbers, and cubes. Descartes introduced the study of figurate numbers based on the Platonic solids and some semiregular polyhedra; his work included the icosahedral numbers. However, De solidorum elementis was lost, and not rediscovered until 1860. In the meantime, icosahedral numbers had been studied again by other mathematicians, including Friedrich Wilhelm Marpurg in 1774, Georg Simon Klügel in 1808, and Sir Frederick Pollock in 1850.
