= Polydivisible number =

Number whose first n digits is a multiple of n

In mathematics a polydivisible number (or magic number) is a number in a given number base with digits abcde... that has the following properties:

1. Its first digit a is not 0.
2. The number formed by its first two digits ab is a multiple of 2.
3. The number formed by its first three digits abc is a multiple of 3.
4. The number formed by its first four digits abcd is a multiple of 4.
5. etc.

== Definition ==
Let $n$ be a positive integer, and let $k = \lfloor \log_{b}{n} \rfloor + 1$ be the number of digits in n written in base b. The number n is a polydivisible number if for all $1 \leq i \leq k$,

$$\left\lfloor\frac{n}{b^{k - i}}\right\rfloor \equiv 0 \pmod i$$.

Example

For example, 10801 is a seven-digit polydivisible number in base 4, as

$$\left\lfloor\frac{10801}{4^{7 - 1}}\right\rfloor = \left\lfloor\frac{10801}{4096}\right\rfloor = 2 \equiv 0 \pmod 1,$$
$$\left\lfloor\frac{10801}{4^{7 - 2}}\right\rfloor = \left\lfloor\frac{10801}{1024}\right\rfloor = 10 \equiv 0 \pmod 2,$$
$$\left\lfloor\frac{10801}{4^{7 - 3}}\right\rfloor = \left\lfloor\frac{10801}{256}\right\rfloor = 42 \equiv 0 \pmod 3,$$
$$\left\lfloor\frac{10801}{4^{7 - 4}}\right\rfloor = \left\lfloor\frac{10801}{64}\right\rfloor = 168 \equiv 0 \pmod 4,$$
$$\left\lfloor\frac{10801}{4^{7 - 5}}\right\rfloor = \left\lfloor\frac{10801}{16}\right\rfloor = 675 \equiv 0 \pmod 5,$$
$$\left\lfloor\frac{10801}{4^{7 - 6}}\right\rfloor = \left\lfloor\frac{10801}{4}\right\rfloor = 2700 \equiv 0 \pmod 6,$$
$$\left\lfloor\frac{10801}{4^{7 - 7}}\right\rfloor = \left\lfloor\frac{10801}{1}\right\rfloor = 10801 \equiv 0 \pmod 7.$$

== Enumeration ==
For any given base $b$, there are only a finite number of polydivisible numbers.

=== Maximum polydivisible number ===
The following table lists maximum polydivisible numbers for some bases b, where A−Z represent digit values 10 to 35.

Base $b$	Maximum polydivisible number (OEIS: A109032)	Number of base-b digits (OEIS: A109783)
2	10_{2}	2
3	20 0220_{3}	6
4	222 0301_{4}	7
5	40220 42200_{5}	10
10	36085 28850 36840 07860 36725	25
12	6068 903468 50BA68 00B036 206464_{12}	28

=== Estimate for F_{b}(n) and Σ(b) ===
Graph of number of $n$-digit polydivisible numbers in base 10 $F_{10}(n)$ vs estimate of $F_{10}(n)$

Let $n$ be the number of digits. The function $F_b(n)$ determines the number of polydivisible numbers that has $n$ digits in base $b$, and the function $\Sigma(b)$ is the total number of polydivisible numbers in base $b$.

If $k$ is a polydivisible number in base $b$ with $n - 1$ digits, then it can be extended to create a polydivisible number with $n$ digits if there is a number between $bk$ and $b(k + 1) - 1$ that is divisible by $n$. If $n$ is less or equal to $b$, then it is always possible to extend an $n - 1$ digit polydivisible number to an $n$-digit polydivisible number in this way, and indeed there may be more than one possible extension. If $n$ is greater than $b$, it is not always possible to extend a polydivisible number in this way, and as $n$ becomes larger, the chances of being able to extend a given polydivisible number become smaller. On average, each polydivisible number with $n - 1$ digits can be extended to a polydivisible number with $n$ digits in $\frac{b}{n}$ different ways. This leads to the following estimate for $F_{b}(n)$:

$$F_b(n) \approx (b - 1)\frac{b^{n-1}}{n!}.$$

Summing over all values of n, this estimate suggests that the total number of polydivisible numbers will be approximately

$$\Sigma(b) \approx \frac{b - 1}{b}(e^{b}-1)$$

Base $b$	$\Sigma(b)$	Est. of $\Sigma(b)$	Percent Error
2	2	$\frac{e^{2} - 1}{2} \approx 3.1945$	59.7%
3	15	$\frac{2}{3}(e^{3} - 1) \approx 12.725$	-15.1%
4	37	$\frac{3}{4}(e^{4} - 1) \approx 40.199$	8.64%
5	127	$\frac{4}{5}(e^{5} - 1) \approx 117.93$	-7.14%
10	20456	$\frac{9}{10}(e^{10} - 1) \approx 19823$	-3.09%

== Specific bases ==
All numbers are represented in base $b$, using A−Z to represent digit values 10 to 35.

=== Base 2 ===
Length n	F_{2}(n)	Est. of F_{2}(n)	Polydivisible numbers
1	1	1	1
2	1	1	10
3	0	1	$\varnothing$

=== Base 3 ===
Length n	F_{3}(n)	Est. of F_{3}(n)	Polydivisible numbers
1	2	2	1, 2
2	3	3	11, 20, 22
3	3	3	110, 200, 220
4	3	2	1100, 2002, 2200
5	2	1	11002, 20022
6	2	1	110020, 200220
7	0	0	$\varnothing$

=== Base 4 ===
Length n	F_{4}(n)	Est. of F_{4}(n)	Polydivisible numbers
1	3	3	1, 2, 3
2	6	6	10, 12, 20, 22, 30, 32
3	8	8	102, 120, 123, 201, 222, 300, 303, 321
4	8	8	1020, 1200, 1230, 2010, 2220, 3000, 3030, 3210
5	7	6	10202, 12001, 12303, 20102, 22203, 30002, 32103
6	4	4	120012, 123030, 222030, 321030
7	1	2	2220301
8	0	1	$\varnothing$

=== Base 5 ===
The polydivisible numbers in base 5 are

1, 2, 3, 4, 11, 13, 20, 22, 24, 31, 33, 40, 42, 44, 110, 113, 132, 201, 204, 220, 223, 242, 311, 314, 330, 333, 402, 421, 424, 440, 443, 1102, 1133, 1322, 2011, 2042, 2200, 2204, 2231, 2420, 2424, 3113, 3140, 3144, 3302, 3333, 4022, 4211, 4242, 4400, 4404, 4431, 11020, 11330, 13220, 20110, 20420, 22000, 22040, 22310, 24200, 24240, 31130, 31400, 31440, 33020, 33330, 40220, 42110, 42420, 44000, 44040, 44310, 110204, 113300, 132204, 201102, 204204, 220000, 220402, 223102, 242000, 242402, 311300, 314000, 314402, 330204, 333300, 402204, 421102, 424204, 440000, 440402, 443102, 1133000, 1322043, 2011021, 2042040, 2204020, 2420003, 2424024, 3113002, 3140000, 3144021, 4022042, 4211020, 4431024, 11330000, 13220431, 20110211, 20420404, 24200031, 31400004, 31440211, 40220422, 42110202, 44310242, 132204314, 201102110, 242000311, 314000044, 402204220, 443102421, 1322043140, 2011021100, 3140000440, 4022042200

The smallest base 5 polydivisible numbers with n digits are

1, 11, 110, 1102, 11020, 110204, 1133000, 11330000, 132204314, 1322043140, none...

The largest base 5 polydivisible numbers with n digits are

4, 44, 443, 4431, 44310, 443102, 4431024, 44310242, 443102421, 4022042200, none...

The number of base 5 polydivisible numbers with n digits are

4, 10, 17, 21, 21, 21, 13, 10, 6, 4, 0, 0, 0...

Length n	F_{5}(n)	Est. of F_{5}(n)
1	4	4
2	10	10
3	17	17
4	21	21
5	21	21
6	21	17
7	13	12
8	10	8
9	6	4
10	4	2

=== Base 10 ===
The polydivisible numbers in base 10 are

1, 2, 3, 4, 5, 6, 7, 8, 9, 10, 12, 14, 16, 18, 20, 22, 24, 26, 28, 30, 32, 34, 36, 38, 40, 42, 44, 46, 48, 50, 52, 54, 56, 58, 60, 62, 64, 66, 68, 70, 72, 74, 76, 78, 80, 82, 84, 86, 88, 90, 92, 94, 96, 98, 102, 105, 108, 120, 123, 126, 129, 141, 144, 147, 162, 165, 168, 180, 183, 186, 189, 201, 204, 207, 222, 225, 228, 243, 246, 249, 261, 264, 267, 282, 285, 288... (sequence A144688 in the OEIS)

The smallest base 10 polydivisible numbers with n digits are

1, 10, 102, 1020, 10200, 102000, 1020005, 10200056, 102000564, 1020005640, 10200056405, 102006162060, 1020061620604, 10200616206046, 102006162060465, 1020061620604656, 10200616206046568, 108054801036000018, 1080548010360000180, 10805480103600001800, ... (sequence A214437 in the OEIS)

The largest base 10 polydivisible numbers with n digits are

9, 98, 987, 9876, 98765, 987654, 9876545, 98765456, 987654564, 9876545640, 98765456405, 987606963096, 9876069630960, 98760696309604, 987606963096045, 9876062430364208, 98485872309636009, 984450645096105672, 9812523240364656789, 96685896604836004260, ... (sequence A225608 in the OEIS)

The number of base 10 polydivisible numbers with n digits are

9, 45, 150, 375, 750, 1200, 1713, 2227, 2492, 2492, 2225, 2041, 1575, 1132, 770, 571, 335, 180, 90, 44, 18, 12, 6, 3, 1, 0, 0, 0, 0, 0, 0, 0, 0, 0, 0, 0, 0, 0, 0, 0, 0, 0, 0, 0, 0, 0, 0, 0, 0, 0, ... (sequence A143671 in the OEIS)

Length n	F_{10}(n)	Est. of F_{10}(n)
1	9	9
2	45	45
3	150	150
4	375	375
5	750	750
6	1200	1250
7	1713	1786
8	2227	2232
9	2492	2480
10	2492	2480
11	2225	2255
12	2041	1879
13	1575	1445
14	1132	1032
15	770	688
16	571	430
17	335	253
18	180	141
19	90	74
20	44	37
21	18	17
22	12	8
23	6	3
24	3	1
25	1	1

== Programming example ==
The example below searches for polydivisible numbers in Python.

def find_polydivisible(base: int) -> list[int]:
    """Find polydivisible number."""
    numbers = []
    previous = [i for i in range(1, base)]
    new = []
    digits = 2
    while not previous == []:
        numbers.append(previous)
        for n in previous:
            for j in range(0, base):
                number = n * base + j
                if number % digits == 0:
                    new.append(number)
        previous = new
        new = []
        digits = digits + 1
    return numbers

== Related problems ==
Polydivisible numbers represent a generalization of the following well-known problem in recreational mathematics:

Arrange the digits 1 to 9 in order so that the first two digits form a multiple of 2, the first three digits form a multiple of 3, the first four digits form a multiple of 4 etc. and finally the entire number is a multiple of 9.

The solution to the problem is a nine-digit polydivisible number with the additional condition that it contains the digits 1 to 9 exactly once each. There are 2,492 nine-digit polydivisible numbers, but the only one that satisfies the additional condition is

381 654 729

Other problems involving polydivisible numbers include:

- Finding polydivisible numbers with additional restrictions on the digits - for example, the longest polydivisible number that only uses even digits is

48 000 688 208 466 084 040

- Finding palindromic polydivisible numbers - for example, the longest palindromic polydivisible number is

30 000 600 003

- A common, trivial extension of the aforementioned example is to arrange the digits 0 to 9 to make a 10 digit number in the same way, the result is 3816547290. This is a pandigital polydivisible number.
