= AD 118 =

118 in various calendars
- Gregorian calendar: 118; CXVIII
- Ab urbe condita: 871
- Assyrian calendar: 4868
- Balinese saka calendar: 39–40
- Bengali calendar: −476 – −475
- Berber calendar: 1068
- Buddhist calendar: 662
- Burmese calendar: −520
- Byzantine calendar: 5626–5627
- Chinese calendar: 丁巳年 (Fire Snake); 2815 or 2608 — to — 戊午年 (Earth Horse); 2816 or 2609
- Coptic calendar: −166 – −165
- Discordian calendar: 1284
- Ethiopian calendar: 110–111
- Hebrew calendar: 3878–3879
- Hindu calendars
- Vikram Samvat: 174–175
- Shaka Samvat: 39–40
- Kali Yuga: 3218–3219
- Holocene calendar: 10118
- Iranian calendar: 504 BP – 503 BP
- Islamic calendar: 520 BH – 518 BH
- Javanese calendar: N/A
- Julian calendar: 118; CXVIII
- Korean calendar: 2451
- Minguo calendar: 1794 before ROC 民前1794年
- Nanakshahi calendar: −1350
- Seleucid era: 429/430 AG
- Thai solar calendar: 660–661
- Tibetan calendar: མེ་མོ་སྦྲུལ་ལོ་ (female Fire-Snake); 244 or −137 or −909 — to — ས་ཕོ་རྟ་ལོ་ (male Earth-Horse); 245 or −136 or −908

Year 118 (CXVIII) was a common year starting on Friday of the Julian calendar. At the time, it was known as the Year of the Consulship of Hadrianus and Fuscus (or, less frequently, year 871 Ab urbe condita). The denomination 118 for this year has been used since the early medieval period, when the Anno Domini calendar era became the prevalent method in Europe for naming years.

== Events ==
=== By place ===
==== Roman Empire ====
- Trajan's Forum (commissioned by the late Emperor Trajan) is completed with triumphal arches, columns, a market complex, and an enormous basilica, all of which replace hundreds of dwellings.
- Emperor Hadrian is also a Roman Consul.
- Rome has a population exceeding 1 million, making it the largest city in the world.
- Osroene is returned to native rule by the Roman Empire.
- Plot of the consuls: Hadrian executes four senators, all former consuls, who had been shown to have plotted against him. His relations with the Senate are strained.
- Pantheon, in Rome, starts to be built (approximate date).
- 118–128 – Battle of Centaurs and Wild Beasts, from Hadrian's Villa, Tivoli, Italy, is made (approximate date). It may be a copy of a painting done by the late 5th century BC Greek artist Zeuxis. It is now kept at Staatliche Museen zu Berlin, Preussischer Kulturbesitz, Antikensammlung.

==== Asia ====
- The north-south feud between the Hun Dynasty ends.
- The oldest known painted depiction of a wheelbarrow is found in a Chinese tomb of Chengde, Sichuan province, dated to this year.

== Deaths ==
- August 8 – Primus, patriarch of Alexandria
- Aulus Cornelius Palma, Roman politician
- Bassus of Lucera, Roman bishop and martyr
- Gaius Avidius Nigrinus, Roman politician
- Lucius Publilius Celsus, Roman politician
- Lusius Quietus, Roman general and governor
- Ren Shang, Chinese general of Han dynasty
- Terentian, Roman bishop and martyr
