= 8/11 =

8/11 may refer to:

- August 11 (month-day date notation)
- November 8 (day-month date notation)
