= Octonary =

For the base-8 numeral system, see octal.

An octonary is an eight-line section in a poem, song or psalm. The most notable example is found in Psalm 119

In the French renaissance the octonaire became a form of moralizing chanson.

It can also mean of 8th rank or order (primary, secondary, tertiary … octonary).
