= 104 (number) =

← 103	104	105 →
- ← 100 101 102 103 104 105 106 107 108 109 →: List of numbers; Integers; ← 0 100 200 300 400 500 600 700 800 900 →
- Cardinal: one hundred four
- Ordinal: 104th (one hundred fourth)
- Factorization: 2^{3} × 13
- Divisors: 1, 2, 4, 8, 13, 26, 52, 104
- Greek numeral: ΡΔ´
- Roman numeral: CIV, civ
- Binary: 1101000_{2}
- Ternary: 10212_{3}
- Senary: 252_{6}
- Octal: 150_{8}
- Duodecimal: 88_{12}
- Hexadecimal: 68_{16}

104 (one hundred [and] four) is the natural number following 103 and preceding 105.

== In mathematics ==
104 is a refactorable number and a primitive semiperfect number.

The smallest known 4-regular matchstick graph has 104 edges and 52 vertices, where four unit line segments intersect at every vertex.

The second largest sporadic group $\mathbb {B}$ has a McKay–Thompson series, representative of a principal modular function is $T_{2A}(\tau)$, with constant term $a(0) = 104$:

$$j_{2A}(\tau) = T_{2A}(\tau)+104 = \frac{1}{q} + 104 + 4372q + 96256q^2 + \cdots$$

The Tits group $\mathbb {T}$, which is the only finite simple group to classify as either a non-strict group of Lie type or sporadic group, holds a minimal faithful complex representation in 104 dimensions.
