= 4/11 =

4/11 may refer to:

- April 11 (month-day date notation)
- November 4 (day-month date notation)
