= AD 109 =

109 in various calendars
- Gregorian calendar: 109; CIX
- Ab urbe condita: 862
- Assyrian calendar: 4859
- Balinese saka calendar: 30–31
- Bengali calendar: −485 – −484
- Berber calendar: 1059
- Buddhist calendar: 653
- Burmese calendar: −529
- Byzantine calendar: 5617–5618
- Chinese calendar: 戊申年 (Earth Monkey); 2806 or 2599 — to — 己酉年 (Earth Rooster); 2807 or 2600
- Coptic calendar: −175 – −174
- Discordian calendar: 1275
- Ethiopian calendar: 101–102
- Hebrew calendar: 3869–3870
- Hindu calendars
- Vikram Samvat: 165–166
- Shaka Samvat: 30–31
- Kali Yuga: 3209–3210
- Holocene calendar: 10109
- Iranian calendar: 513 BP – 512 BP
- Islamic calendar: 529 BH – 528 BH
- Javanese calendar: N/A
- Julian calendar: 109; CIX
- Korean calendar: 2442
- Minguo calendar: 1803 before ROC 民前1803年
- Nanakshahi calendar: −1359
- Seleucid era: 420/421 AG
- Thai solar calendar: 651–652
- Tibetan calendar: ས་ཕོ་སྤྲེ་ལོ་ (male Earth-Monkey); 235 or −146 or −918 — to — ས་མོ་བྱ་ལོ་ (female Earth-Bird); 236 or −145 or −917

Year 109 (CIX) was a common year starting on Monday of the Julian calendar. At the time, it was known as the Year of the Consulship of Palma and Tullus (or, less frequently, year 862 Ab urbe condita). The denomination 109 for this year has been used since the early medieval period, when the Anno Domini calendar era became the prevalent method in Europe for naming years.

== Events ==
=== By place ===
==== Roman Empire ====
- June 24 – The Aqua Traiana is inaugurated by Emperor Trajan; the aqueduct channels water from Lake Bracciano, 40 kilometers (25 mi) northwest of Rome.
- The Via Traiana is constructed at the Emperor Trajan's personal expense; the road connects Benevento with Brundisium (Brindisi).
- The Baths of Trajan, built by the architect Apollodorus of Damascus, are dedicated during the Calends. The thermae are constructed on the platform of the Palace of Nero (Domus Aurea) in Rome.
- Pliny the Younger is legate to Bithynia.

==== Parthian Empire ====
- Osroes I of Parthia succeeds his brother Pacorus II, and rules over the western Parthian Empire.

=== By topic ===
==== Religion ====
- The Christian Church proclaims itself to be universal (catholic).
