= 115 BC =

115 BC in various calendars
- Gregorian calendar: 115 BC; CXV BC
- Ab urbe condita: 639
- Ancient Egypt era: XXXIII dynasty, 209
- Pharaoh: Ptolemy IX Lathyros, 2
- Ancient Greek Olympiad (summer): 166th Olympiad, year 2
- Assyrian calendar: 4636
- Balinese saka calendar: N/A
- Bengali calendar: −708 – −707
- Berber calendar: 836
- Buddhist calendar: 430
- Burmese calendar: −752
- Byzantine calendar: 5394–5395
- Chinese calendar: 乙丑年 (Wood Ox); 2583 or 2376 — to — 丙寅年 (Fire Tiger); 2584 or 2377
- Coptic calendar: −398 – −397
- Discordian calendar: 1052
- Ethiopian calendar: −122 – −121
- Hebrew calendar: 3646–3647
- Hindu calendars
- Vikram Samvat: −58 – −57
- Shaka Samvat: N/A
- Kali Yuga: 2986–2987
- Holocene calendar: 9886
- Iranian calendar: 736 BP – 735 BP
- Islamic calendar: 759 BH – 758 BH
- Javanese calendar: N/A
- Julian calendar: N/A
- Korean calendar: 2219
- Minguo calendar: 2026 before ROC 民前2026年
- Nanakshahi calendar: −1582
- Seleucid era: 197/198 AG
- Thai solar calendar: 428–429
- Tibetan calendar: ཤིང་མོ་གླང་ལོ་ (female Wood-Ox); 12 or −369 or −1141 — to — མེ་ཕོ་སྟག་ལོ་ (male Fire-Tiger); 13 or −368 or −1140

Year 115 BC was a year of the pre-Julian Roman calendar. At the time it was known as the Year of the Consulship of Scaurus and Metellus (or, less frequently, year 639 Ab urbe condita) and the Second Year of Yuanding. The denomination 115 BC for this year has been used since the early medieval period, when the Anno Domini calendar era became the prevalent method in Europe for naming years.

== Events ==
=== By place ===
==== Roman Republic ====
- Gaius Marius is praetor in Rome: he defeats Celtic tribes in modern-day Spain.
- Marcus Aemilius Scaurus defeats the Carni Celtic tribes of Northern Italy, leading to their submission to Roman rule.

==== Middle East ====
- Parthia makes a trade treaty with China.
- The Kingdom of Sheba collapses.

== Births ==
- Marcus Licinius Crassus, Roman general and consul (d. 53 BC)

== Deaths ==
- Publius Mucius Scaevola, Roman consul and jurist
- Quintus Caecilius Metellus Macedonicus, Roman consul (b. c. 210 BC)
