= 10/9 =

10/9 may refer to:

- October 9 (month-day date notation)
- September 10 (day-month date notation)
- 10 shillings and 9 pence in UK predecimal currency
