= 110 (number) =

← 109	110	111 →
- ← 110 111 112 113 114 115 116 117 118 119 →: List of numbers; Integers; ← 0 100 200 300 400 500 600 700 800 900 →
- Cardinal: one hundred ten
- Ordinal: 110th (one hundred tenth)
- Factorization: 2 × 5 × 11
- Divisors: 1, 2, 5, 10, 11, 22, 55, 110
- Greek numeral: ΡΙ´
- Roman numeral: CX, cx
- Binary: 1101110_{2}
- Ternary: 11002_{3}
- Senary: 302_{6}
- Octal: 156_{8}
- Duodecimal: 92_{12}
- Hexadecimal: 6E_{16}

110 (one hundred [and] ten) is the natural number following 109 and preceding 111.

== In mathematics ==
110 is a sphenic number and a pronic number. Following the prime quadruplet (101, 103, 107, 109), at 110, the Mertens function reaches a low of −5.

110 is the sum of three consecutive squares, $110 = 5^2 + 6^2 + 7^2$.

RSA-110 is one of the RSA numbers, large semiprimes that are part of the RSA Factoring Challenge.

In base 10, the number 110 is a Harshad number and a self number.

== In other fields ==
110 is also:

- A percentage in the expression "To give 110%", meaning to give a little more effort than one's maximum effort
- Lowest number to not be considered a favourite by anyone among 44,000 people surveyed in a 2014 online poll and subsequently adopted by British television show QI as the show's favourite number in 2017.
- 110 is also the number of the age of a person that becomes a supercentenarian.

== Eleventy ==
Compare twelfty.

=== As 110 ===
- One hundred and ten is also known as "eleventy", a term made famous in its ordinal form by linguist and author J. R. R. Tolkien (Bilbo Baggins celebrates his eleventy-first birthday at the beginning of The Lord of the Rings) and derived from the Old English hund endleofantig.
- Eleventy is used in the comic reading of a phone number in the Irish TV series The Savage Eye by Dave McSavage playing an opiate user advertising life insurance.

=== Other meanings of eleventy ===
Eleventy has been used to mean an indefinite large number - "lots". Similarly eleventy-eleven was used in nineteenth century Mississippi in the same role. Eleventy is the name of an Italian luxury clothing brand.
