= 119 (number) =

← 118	119	120 →
- ← 110 111 112 113 114 115 116 117 118 119 →: List of numbers; Integers; ← 0 100 200 300 400 500 600 700 800 900 →
- Cardinal: one hundred nineteen
- Ordinal: 119th (one hundred nineteenth)
- Factorization: 7 × 17
- Divisors: 1, 7, 17, 119
- Greek numeral: ΡΙΘ´
- Roman numeral: CXIX, cxix
- Binary: 1110111_{2}
- Ternary: 11102_{3}
- Senary: 315_{6}
- Octal: 167_{8}
- Duodecimal: 9B_{12}
- Hexadecimal: 77_{16}

119 (one hundred [and] nineteen) is the natural number following 118 and preceding 120.

== Mathematics ==
119 is a Perrin number. 119 is the order of the largest cyclic subgroups of the monster group.
