= 109 (number) =

← 108	109	110 →
- ← 100 101 102 103 104 105 106 107 108 109 →: List of numbers; Integers; ← 0 100 200 300 400 500 600 700 800 900 →
- Cardinal: one hundred nine
- Ordinal: 109th (one hundred ninth)
- Factorization: prime
- Prime: 29th
- Divisors: 1, 109
- Greek numeral: ΡΘ´
- Roman numeral: CIX, cix
- Binary: 1101101_{2}
- Ternary: 11001_{3}
- Senary: 301_{6}
- Octal: 155_{8}
- Duodecimal: 91_{12}
- Hexadecimal: 6D_{16}

109 (one hundred [and] nine) is the natural number following 108 and preceding 110.

== In mathematics ==
109 is the 29th prime number. As 29 is itself prime, 109 is the tenth super-prime. The previous prime is 107, making them both twin primes.

109 is a centered triangular number.

There are exactly:

- 109 different families of subsets of a three-element set whose union includes all three elements.
- 109 different loops (invertible but not necessarily associative binary operations with an identity) on six elements.
- 109 squares on an infinite chessboard that can be reached by a knight within three moves.

There are 109 uniform edge-colorings to the 11 regular and semiregular (or Archimedean) tilings.

The decimal expansion of 1/109 can be computed using the alternating series, with $F(n)$ the $n^{th}$ Fibonacci number:

$$\frac{1}{109}=\sum_{n=1}^\infty{F(n)\times 10^{-(n+1)}}\times (-1)^{n+1}=0.00917431\dots$$

The decimal expansion of 1/109 has 108 digits, making 109 a full reptend prime in decimal. The last six digits of the 108-digit cycle are 853211, the first six Fibonacci numbers in descending order.

== See also ==
- 109 (disambiguation)
