= 120 (number) =

← 119	120	121 →
- ← 120 121 122 123 124 125 126 127 128 129 →: List of numbers; Integers; ← 0 100 200 300 400 500 600 700 800 900 →
- Cardinal: one hundred twenty
- Ordinal: 120th (one hundred twentieth)
- Numeral system: Centovigesimal
- Factorization: 2^{3} × 3 × 5
- Divisors: 1, 2, 3, 4, 5, 6, 8, 10, 12, 15, 20, 24, 30, 40, 60, 120
- Greek numeral: ΡΚ´
- Roman numeral: CXX, cxx
- Binary: 1111000_{2}
- Ternary: 11110_{3}
- Senary: 320_{6}
- Octal: 170_{8}
- Duodecimal: A0_{12}
- Hexadecimal: 78_{16}

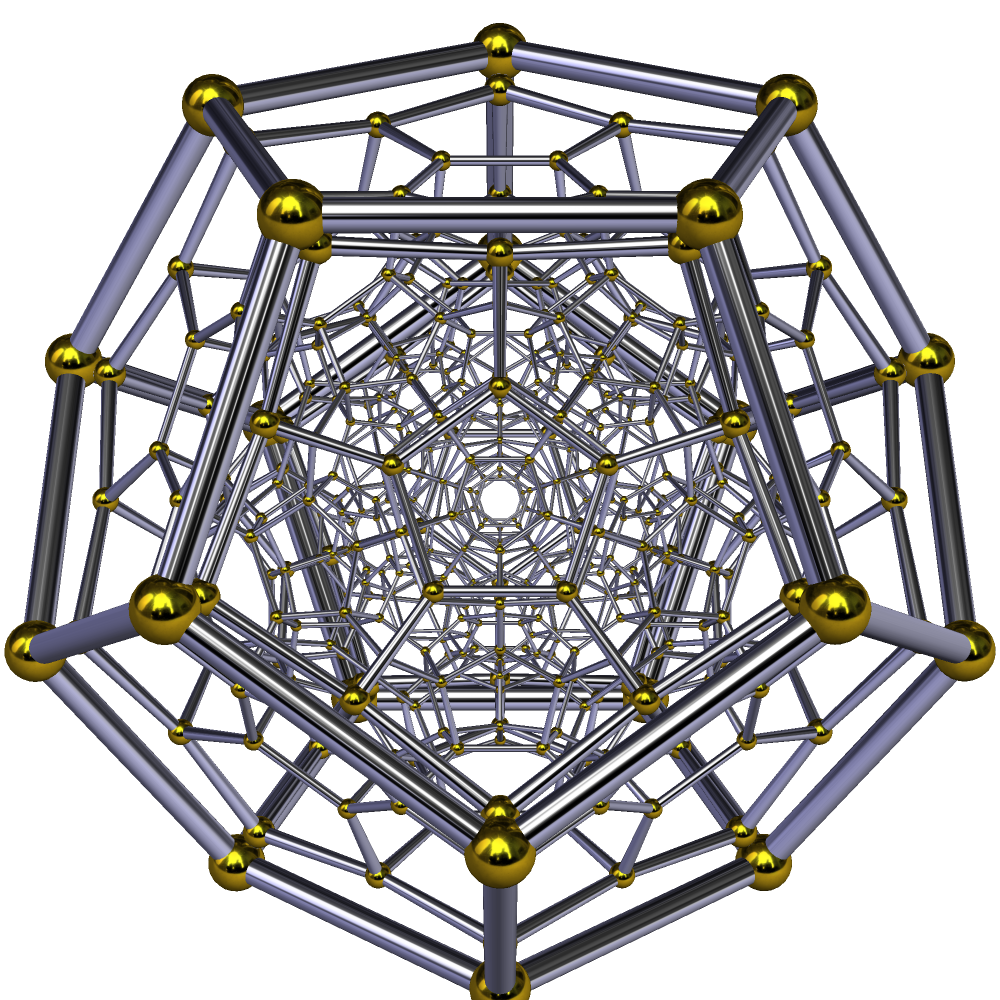
The 120-cell (or hecatonicosachoron) is a convex regular 4-polytope consisting of 120 dodecahedral cells.

120 (one hundred [and] twenty) is the natural number following 119 and preceding 121.

In the Germanic languages, the number 120 was also formerly known as "one hundred". This "hundred" of six score is now obsolete but is described as the long hundred or great hundred in historical contexts.

== In mathematics ==
120 is

- the factorial of 5, i.e., $5!=5\cdot 4\cdot 3\cdot 2\cdot 1$.
- the fifteenth triangular number, as well as the sum of the first eight triangular numbers, making it also a tetrahedral number. 120 is the smallest number to appear six times in Pascal's triangle (as all triangular and tetragonal numbers appear in it). Because 15 is also triangular, 120 is a doubly triangular number. 120 is divisible by the first five triangular numbers and the first four tetrahedral numbers. It is the eighth hexagonal number.
- The 10th highly composite, the 5th superior highly composite, superabundant, and the 5th colossally abundant number. It is also a sparsely totient number. 120 is also the smallest highly composite number with no adjacent prime number, being adjacent to $119=7\cdot 17$ and $121=11^2.$ It is also the smallest positive multiple of six not adjacent to a prime.
- 120 is the first multiply perfect number of order three (a 3-perfect or triperfect number). The sum of its factors (including one and itself) sum to 360, exactly three times 120. Perfect numbers are order two (2-perfect) by the same definition.
- 120 is the sum of a twin prime pair (59 + 61) and the sum of four consecutive prime numbers (23 + 29 + 31 + 37), four consecutive powers of two (8 + 16 + 32 + 64), and four consecutive powers of three (3 + 9 + 27 + 81).
- 120 is divisible by the number of primes below it (30). However, there is no integer that has 120 as the sum of its proper divisors, making 120 an untouchable number.
- The sum of Euler's totient function $\phi (x)$ over the first nineteen integers is 120.
- As 120 is a factorial and one less than a square ($5!=11^{2}-1$), it—with 11—is one of the few Brown number pairs.
- 120 appears in Pierre de Fermat's modified Diophantine problem as the largest known integer of the sequence 1, 3, 8, 120. Fermat wanted to find another positive integer that, when multiplied by any of the other numbers in the sequence, yields a number that is one less than a square. Leonhard Euler also searched for this number. He failed to find an integer, but he did find a fraction that meets the other conditions: $\frac {777,480}{2879^{2}}$.
- The internal angles of a regular hexagon (one where all sides and angles are equal) are all 120 degrees.

== In science ==
In electrical engineering, each line of the three-phase system are 120 degrees apart from each other.

Three soap films meet along a Plateau border at 120° angles.

== In religion ==
- The age at which Moses died (Deut. 34:7).
  - By extension, in Jewish tradition, to wish someone a long life, one says, "Live until 120".
- In astrology, when two planets in a person's chart are 120 degrees apart from each other, this is called a trine. This is supposed to bring good luck to the person's life.

== In other fields ==
120 is also:

- TT scale, a scale for model trains, is 1:120.
- The Standard AC Voltage in US, Canada, Mexico and some other countries.
