= 100 =

← 99	100	101 →
- ← 100 101 102 103 104 105 106 107 108 109 →: List of numbers; Integers; ← 0 100 200 300 400 500 600 700 800 900 →
- Cardinal: one hundred
- Ordinal: 100th (one hundredth)
- Factorization: 2^{2} × 5^{2}
- Divisors: 1, 2, 4, 5, 10, 20, 25, 50, 100
- Greek numeral: Ρ´
- Roman numeral: C, c
- Roman numeral (unicode): Ⅽ, ⅽ, Ｃ, ｃ
- Binary: 1100100_{2}
- Ternary: 10201_{3}
- Senary: 244_{6}
- Octal: 144_{8}
- Duodecimal: 84_{12}
- Hexadecimal: 64_{16}
- Greek numeral: ρ
- Arabic: ١٠٠
- Bengali: ১০০
- Chinese numeral: 佰,百
- Devanagari: १००
- Hebrew: ק
- Khmer: ១០០
- Armenian: Ճ
- Tamil: ௱, க௦௦
- Thai: ๑๐๐
- Egyptian hieroglyph: 𓍢
- Babylonian cuneiform: 𒐕𒐏

100 or one hundred (Roman numeral: C) (Note: Reinforced by but not originally derived from Latin centum.) is the natural number following 99 and preceding 101.

== In mathematics ==
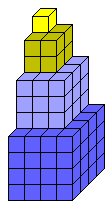
100 as the sum of the first positive cubes

100 is the square of 10 (in scientific notation it is written as 10^{2}). The standard SI prefix for a hundred is "hecto-".

100 is the basis of percentages (per centum meaning "by the hundred" in Latin), with 100% being a full amount.

100 is a Harshad number in decimal, and also in base-four, a base in-which it is also a self-descriptive number.

100 is the sum of the first nine prime numbers, from 2 through 23. It is also divisible by the number of primes below it, 25.

100 cannot be expressed as the difference between any integer and the total of coprimes below it, making it a noncototient.

100 has a reduced totient of 20, and an Euler totient of 40. A totient value of 100 is obtained from four numbers: 101, 125, 202, and 250.

100 can be expressed as a sum of some of its divisors, making it a semiperfect number. The geometric mean of its nine divisors is 10.

100 is the sum of the cubes of the first four positive integers (100 = 1^{3} + 2^{3} + 3^{3} + 4^{3}). This is related by Nicomachus's theorem to the fact that 100 also equals the square of the sum of the first four positive integers: 100 = 10^{2} = (1 + 2 + 3 + 4)^{2}.

100 = 2^{6} + 6^{2}, thus 100 is the seventh Leyland number. 100 is also the seventeenth Erdős–Woods number, and the fourth 18-gonal number.

== In history ==
- In medieval contexts, it may be described as the short hundred or five score in order to differentiate the English and Germanic use of "hundred" to describe the long hundred (Note: see) of six score or 120.

== In money ==
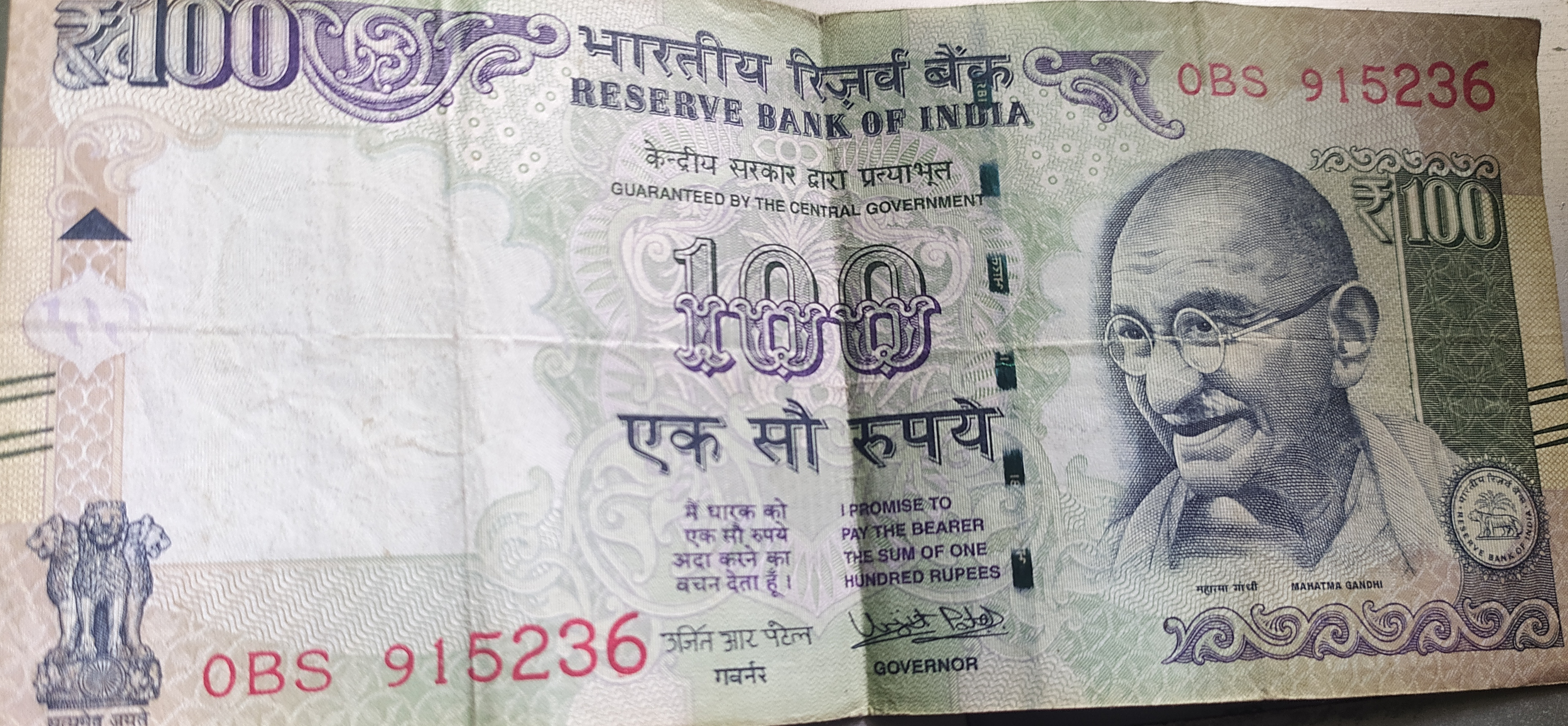
Hundred rupee note India

Most of the world's currencies are divided into 100 subunits. For example, one euro is one hundred cents and one pound sterling is one hundred pence.

The U.S. hundred-dollar bill, Series 2025

The United States one-hundred-dollar bill has Benjamin Franklin's portrait; this "Benjamin" is the largest American banknote in circulation.

== In other fields ==
=== Computers and software ===
- The HTTP status code indicating that the client should continue with its request.
- 100 Mbps Ethernet: Fast Ethernet standard.

=== Science and measurement ===
In zoology, the group of centipedes (Chilopoda) is classified as a subclass of millipedes. Centipedes are characterised by having between 15 and 191 pairs of legs. Although the name refers to "hundred", the actual number varies gradually.

With regard to the biological value of proteins, the number 100 is used as a reference value: the biological value of a protein is measured by how well the dietary protein can be converted into the body's own protein. The chicken egg was arbitrarily set at a value of 100, and other proteins are evaluated relative to this.

Anders Celsius defined 100° as the boiling point and 0° as the melting point of water for his temperature scale. In 1744, shortly after Celsius' death, the modern Celsius scale was introduced by Carl von Linné, in which the boiling point of water is assigned the value 100°C and the freezing point the value 0°C.

- 100 centimetres = 1 meter: Used in metric measurements.
- 100 is the atomic number of Fermium (Fm): A synthetic chemical element in the periodic table.

=== Sports ===
- 100-meter sprint: A Popular Olympic event.

=== Culture ===
- 100 emoji (💯): Commonly used to represent something excellent or perfect.

== See also ==
- 1 vs. 100
- AFI's 100 Years...
- Hundred (county division)
- Hundred (word)
- Hundred Days
- Hundred Years' War
- List of highways numbered 100
- Top 100
