= Vigesimal =

Base-20 numeral system

The Maya numerals are an example of a base-20 numeral system.

A vigesimal (/vɪˈdʒɛsɪməl/ vij-ESS-im-əl) or base-20 (base-score) numeral system is based on twenty (in the same way in which the decimal numeral system is based on ten). Vigesimal is derived from the Latin adjective vicesimus, meaning 'twentieth'.

== Places ==
In a vigesimal place system, twenty individual numerals (or digit symbols) are used, ten more than in the decimal system. One modern method of finding the extra needed symbols is to write ten as the letter A, or A_{20} , where the _{20} means base 20, to write nineteen as J_{20}, and the numbers between with the corresponding letters of the alphabet. This is similar to the common computer-science practice of writing hexadecimal numerals over 9 with the letters "A–F". Another less common method skips over the letter "I", in order to avoid confusion between I_{20} as eighteen and one, so that the number eighteen is written as J_{20}, and nineteen is written as K_{20}. The number twenty is written as 10_{20}.

Comparison
Decimal	Vigesimal		Name spelled out (in English)
0	0		zero
1	1		one
2	2		two
3	3		three
4	4		four
5	5		five
6	6		six
7	7		seven
8	8		eight
9	9		nine
10	A		ten
11	B		eleven
12	C		twelve
13	D		thirteen
14	E		fourteen
15	F		fifteen
16	G		sixteen
17	H		seventeen
18	I	J	eighteen
19	J	K	nineteen
20	10		twenty
400	100		four hundred
8000	1000		eight thousand
160000	10000		one hundred and sixty thousand

Vigesimal multiplication table
1	2	3	4	5	6	7	8	9	A	B	C	D	E	F	G	H	I	J	10
2	4	6	8	A	C	E	G	I	10	12	14	16	18	1A	1C	1E	1G	1I	20
3	6	9	C	F	I	11	14	17	1A	1D	1G	1J	22	25	28	2B	2E	2H	30
4	8	C	G	10	14	18	1C	1G	20	24	28	2C	2G	30	34	38	3C	3G	40
5	A	F	10	15	1A	1F	20	25	2A	2F	30	35	3A	3F	40	45	4A	4F	50
6	C	I	14	1A	1G	22	28	2E	30	36	3C	3I	44	4A	4G	52	58	5E	60
7	E	11	18	1F	22	29	2G	33	3A	3H	44	4B	4I	55	5C	5J	66	6D	70
8	G	14	1C	20	28	2G	34	3C	40	48	4G	54	5C	60	68	6G	74	7C	80
9	I	17	1G	25	2E	33	3C	41	4A	4J	58	5H	66	6F	74	7D	82	8B	90
A	10	1A	20	2A	30	3A	40	4A	50	5A	60	6A	70	7A	80	8A	90	9A	A0
B	12	1D	24	2F	36	3H	48	4J	5A	61	6C	73	7E	85	8G	97	9I	A9	B0
C	14	1G	28	30	3C	44	4G	58	60	6C	74	7G	88	90	9C	A4	AG	B8	C0
D	16	1J	2C	35	3I	4B	54	5H	6A	73	7G	89	92	9F	A8	B1	BE	C7	D0
E	18	22	2G	3A	44	4I	5C	66	70	7E	88	92	9G	AA	B4	BI	CC	D6	E0
F	1A	25	30	3F	4A	55	60	6F	7A	85	90	9F	AA	B5	C0	CF	DA	E5	F0
G	1C	28	34	40	4G	5C	68	74	80	8G	9C	A8	B4	C0	CG	DC	E8	F4	G0
H	1E	2B	38	45	52	5J	6G	7D	8A	97	A4	B1	BI	CF	DC	E9	F6	G3	H0
I	1G	2E	3C	4A	58	66	74	82	90	9I	AG	BE	CC	DA	E8	F6	G4	H2	I0
J	1I	2H	3G	4F	5E	6D	7C	8B	9A	A9	B8	C7	D6	E5	F4	G3	H2	I1	J0
10	20	30	40	50	60	70	80	90	A0	B0	C0	D0	E0	F0	G0	H0	I0	J0	100

According to this notation:

20_{20} is equivalent to forty in decimal = (2 × 20^{1}) + (0 × 20^{0})
D0_{20} is equivalent to two hundred and sixty in decimal = (13 × 20^{1}) + (0 × 20^{0})
100_{20} is equivalent to four hundred in decimal = (1 × 20^{2}) + (0 × 20^{1}) + (0 × 20^{0}).

In the rest of this article below, numbers are expressed in decimal notation, unless specified otherwise. For example, 10 means ten, 20 means twenty. Numbers in vigesimal notation use the convention that I means eighteen and J means nineteen.

== Fractions ==
As 20 is divisible by two and five and is adjacent to 21, the product of three and seven, thus covering the first four prime numbers, many vigesimal fractions have simple representations, whether terminating or recurring (although thirds are more complicated than in decimal, repeating two digits instead of one). In decimal, dividing by three twice (ninths) only gives one digit periods (1/9 = 0.1111.... for instance) because 9 is the number below ten. 21, however, the number adjacent to 20 that is divisible by 3, is not divisible by 9. Ninths in vigesimal have six-digit periods. As 20 has the same prime factors as 10 (two and five), a fraction will terminate in decimal if and only if it terminates in vigesimal.

In decimal Prime factors of the base: 2, 5 Prime factors of one below the base: 3 Prime factors of one above the base: 11			In vigesimal Prime factors of the base: 2, 5 Prime factors of one below the base: J Prime factors of one above the base: 3, 7		
Fraction	Prime factors of the denominator	Positional representation	Positional representation	Prime factors of the denominator	Fraction
1/2	2	0.5	0.A	2	1/2
1/3	3	0.3333... = 0.3̅	0.6D6D... = 0.6̅D̅	3	1/3
1/4	2	0.25	0.5	2	1/4
1/5	5	0.2	0.4	5	1/5
1/6	2, 3	0.16̅	0.36̅D̅	2, 3	1/6
1/7	7	0.1̅4̅2̅8̅5̅7̅	0.2̅H̅	7	1/7
1/8	2	0.125	0.2A	2	1/8
1/9	3	0.1̅	0.2̅4̅8̅H̅F̅B̅	3	1/9
1/10	2, 5	0.1	0.2	2, 5	1/A
1/11	11	0.0̅9̅	0.1̅G̅7̅5̅9̅	B	1/B
1/12	2, 3	0.083̅	0.1D̅6̅	2, 3	1/C
1/13	13	0.0̅7̅6̅9̅2̅3̅	0.1̅A̅F̅7̅D̅G̅I̅9̅4̅C̅6̅3̅	D	1/D
1/14	2, 7	0.07̅1̅4̅2̅8̅5̅	0.18̅B̅	2, 7	1/E
1/15	3, 5	0.06̅	0.16̅D̅	3, 5	1/F
1/16	2	0.0625	0.15	2	1/G
1/17	17	0.0̅5̅8̅8̅2̅3̅5̅2̅9̅4̅1̅1̅7̅6̅4̅7̅	0.1̅3̅A̅B̅F̅5̅H̅C̅I̅G̅9̅8̅4̅E̅2̅7̅	H	1/H
1/18	2, 3	0.05̅	0.12̅4̅8̅H̅F̅B̅	2, 3	1/I
1/19	19	0.0̅5̅2̅6̅3̅1̅5̅7̅8̅9̅4̅7̅3̅6̅8̅4̅2̅1̅	0.1̅	J	1/J
1/20	2, 5	0.05	0.1	2, 5	1/10

== Cyclic numbers ==
The prime factorization of twenty is 2^{2} × 5, so it is not a perfect power. However, its squarefree part, 5, is congruent to 1 (mod 4). Thus, according to Artin's conjecture on primitive roots, vigesimal has infinitely many cyclic primes, but the fraction of primes that are cyclic is not necessarily ~37.395%. An UnrealScript program that computes the lengths of recurring periods of various fractions in a given set of bases found that, of the first 15,456 primes, ~39.344% are cyclic in vigesimal.

== Irrational numbers ==
Algebraic irrational numbers	In decimal	In vigesimal
√2 (the length of the diagonal of a unit square)	1.41421356237309...	1.85DE37JGF09H6...
√3 (the length of the diagonal of a unit cube)	1.73205080756887...	1.ECG82BDDF5617...
√5 (the length of the diagonal of a 1 × 2 rectangle)	2.2360679774997...	2.4E8AHAB3JHGIB...
φ (phi, the golden ratio = (1+√5)/2)	1.6180339887498...	1.C7458F5BJII95...
Transcendental irrational numbers	In decimal	In vigesimal
π (pi, the ratio of circumference to diameter)	3.14159265358979...	3.2GCEG9GBHJ9D2...
e (the base of the natural logarithm)	2.7182818284590452...	2.E7651H08B0C95...
γ (the limiting difference between the harmonic series and the natural logarithm)	0.5772156649015328606...	0.BAHEA2B19BDIBI...

== Use ==
=== Quinary-vigesimal ===
Many cultures that use a vigesimal system count in fives to twenty, then count twenties similarly. Such a system is referred to as quinary-vigesimal by linguists. Examples include Maya and Inuit-Yupik-Unangan languages.

=== Africa ===
Vigesimal systems are common in Africa, for example in Yoruba. While the Yoruba number system may be regarded as a vigesimal system, it is complex. Igbo, Khana, and Krongo also have full vigesimal systems, while Jola-Fonyi, Gola, and Maasina Fulfulde use a mixed or hybrid vigesimal-decimal system (i.e. vigesimal up to 100, decimal after). Supyire is unique in using a base 80 system with subbases of 20, 10, and 5, but does also have a word for 400.

=== Americas ===
- In English, vigesimal is occasionally used in phrases like "Four score and seven years ago ..." in Lincoln's Gettysburg address (see below).
- Twenty is a base in the Maya and Aztec number systems. The Maya use the following names for the powers of twenty: kal (20), bak (20^{2} = 400), pic (20^{3} = 8,000), calab (20^{4} = 160,000), kinchil (20^{5} = 3,200,000) and alau (20^{6} = 64,000,000). Vigesimal systems predated the Maya in the area, possibly going back to the Olmec, and were commonly used in other Central American languages as well. See Maya numerals and Maya calendar, Nahuatl language.
- The Caddoan language family in central North America traditionally used quinary-vigesimal numbers, as did some tribes along the Pacific coast of North America such as the Haida.
- The Inuit-Yupik-Unangan languages, including Greenlandic, Iñupiaq, Nunivak Cupʼig, and Yupʼik, among others, all have base-20 number systems with sub-base 5. In 1994, Inuit students in Kaktovik, Alaska, came up with the base-20 Kaktovik numerals to better represent their language. Before this invention led to a revival, the Inuit numerals had been falling out of use. The Kaktovik numerals are:

𝋀	𝋁	𝋂	𝋃	𝋄	𝋅	𝋆	𝋇	𝋈	𝋉	𝋊	𝋋	𝋌	𝋍	𝋎	𝋏	𝋐	𝋑	𝋒	𝋓
0	1	2	3	4	5	6	7	8	9	10	11	12	13	14	15	16	17	18	19

=== Asia ===
- Dzongkha, the national language of Bhutan, has a full vigesimal system, with numerals for the powers of 20, 400, 8,000 and 160,000.
- Atong, a language spoken in the South Garo Hills of Meghalaya state, Northeast India, and adjacent areas in Bangladesh, has a full vigesimal system that is nowadays considered archaic.
- In Santali, a Munda language of India, "fifty" is expressed by the phrase bār isī gäl, literally "two twenty ten." Likewise, in Didei, another Munda language spoken in India, complex numerals are decimal to 19 and decimal-vigesimal to 399.
- The Burushaski number system is base-20. For example, 20 altar, 40 alto-altar (2 times 20), 60 iski-altar (3 times 20) etc.
- In East Asia, the Ainu language also uses a counting system that is based around the number 20. "hotnep" is 20, "wanpe etu hotnep" (ten more until two twenties) is 30, "tu hotnep" (two twenties) is 40, "ashikne hotnep" (five twenties) is 100. Subtraction is also heavily used, e.g. "shinepesanpe" (one more until ten) is 9.
- The Chukchi language has a vigesimal numeral system.

=== Oceania ===
There is some evidence of base-20 usage in the Māori language of New Zealand with the suffix hoko- used to multiply by 20. However, higher powers of 20 do not appear in Māori numeration, which has instead been described as a mixed radix system with bases 2 and 10, using decimal to count pairs of things. With this mixed radix interpretation, hoko- means 10 pairs, rather than 20 things.

=== Caucasus ===
- Twenty (otsi, ოცი) is used as a base number in Georgian for numbers 30 to 99. For example, 40 (ormotsi, ორმოცი) literally means two-times-twenty, whereas 80 (otkhmotsi, ოთხმოცი), means four-times-twenty. On the other hand, 31 (otsdatertmeti, ოცდათერთმეტი) literally means, twenty-and-eleven. 67 (samotsdashvidi, სამოცდაშვიდი) is said as, "three-twenty-and-seven".
- Twenty (tq’a, ткъа, ტყა) is used as a base number in the Nakh languages (Chechen, Ingush, and Batsbi).

=== Europe ===
In several European languages like French and Danish, 20 is used as a base, at least with respect to the linguistic structure of the names of certain numbers (though a thoroughgoing consistent vigesimal system, based on the powers 20, 400, 8000 etc., is not generally used). The Celtic languages use a base 20 counting system, and French having extensive influence from Gaulish also uses a base 20 system. Most variations of French in the modern day uses a hybrid system, with more numbers in Quebec and Wallonia being base 10. In other regions like French Switzerland base 10 is exclusively used.

- Twenty (vingt) is used as a base number in the French names of numbers from 70 to 99, except in the French of Belgium, Switzerland, the Democratic Republic of the Congo, Rwanda, the Aosta Valley and the Channel Islands. For example, quatre-vingts, the French word for "80", literally means "four-twenties"; soixante-dix, the word for "70", is literally "sixty-ten"; soixante-quinze ("75") is literally "sixty-fifteen"; quatre-vingt-sept ("87") is literally "four-twenties-seven"; quatre-vingt-dix ("90") is literally "four-twenties-ten"; and quatre-vingt-seize ("96") is literally "four-twenties-sixteen". However, in the French of Belgium, Switzerland, the Democratic Republic of the Congo, Rwanda, the Aosta Valley, and the Channel Islands, the numbers 70 and 90 generally have the names septante and nonante. Therefore, the year 1996 is mille neuf cent quatre-vingt-seize in Parisian French, but it is mille neuf cent nonante-six in Belgian French. In Switzerland, "80" can be quatre-vingts (Geneva, Neuchâtel, Jura) or huitante (Vaud, Valais, Fribourg).
- Twenty (tyve) is used as a base number in the Danish names of tens from 50 to 90. For example, tres (short for tresindstyve) means 3 times 20, i.e. 60. However, Danish numerals are not vigesimal since it is only the names of some of the tens that are etymologically formed in a vigesimal way. In contrast with e.g. French quatre-vingt-seize, the units only go from zero to nine between each ten which is a defining trait of a decimal system.
- Twenty (ugent) is used as a base number in the Breton names of numbers from 40 to 49 and from 60 to 99. For example, daou-ugent means 2 times 20, i.e. 40, and triwec'h ha pevar-ugent (literally "three-six and four-twenty") means 3×6 + 4×20, i.e. 98. However, 30 is tregont and not *dek ha ugent ("ten and twenty"), and 50 is hanter-kant ("half-hundred").
- Twenty (ugain) is used as a base number in Welsh for numbers from 20 to 99 (e.g. 50 is deg a deugain, "ten and twoscore"), although since the 1940s a decimal counting system is often used for cardinal numbers. However, the vigesimal system exclusively is used for ordinal numbers, and is still required in telling the time, money, and with weights and measures. Deugain means "two twenties" i.e. 40, trigain means 'three twenties' i.e. 60, etc. dau ar bymtheg a deugain means 57 (two on fifteen and forty). As with Breton, 50 can also be expressed as hanner cant ("half hundred"). Prior to its withdrawal from circulation, papur chweugain (note of sixscore) was the nickname for the ten-shilling (120 pence) note, as 120 (old) pence was equal to half a pound sterling. the term chweugain continues to be used to mean 50 pence in modern Welsh, and phrases like pisin chweugain ('50p piece') are also not uncommon.
- Twenty (fichead) is traditionally used as a base number in Scottish Gaelic, with deich ar fhichead or fichead 's a deich being 30 (ten over twenty, or twenty and ten), dà fhichead 40 (two twenties), dà fhichead 's a deich 50 (two twenty and ten) / leth-cheud 50 (half a hundred), trì fichead 60 (three twenties) and so on up to naoidh fichead 180 (nine twenties). Nowadays a decimal system is taught in schools, but the vigesimal system is still used by many, particularly older speakers.
- Twenty (feed) is traditionally used as a base number in Manx Gaelic, with jeih as feed being 30 (ten and twenty), daeed 40 (two twenties), jeih as daeed 50 (ten and two twenties), tree feed 60 (three twenty) and so on. A decimal system also exists, using the following tens: jeih (ten), feed (twenty), treead (thirty), daeed (forty), queigad (fifty), sheyad (sixty), shiagtad (seventy), hoghtad (eighty) and nuyad (ninety).
- Twenty (njëzet) is used as a base number in Albanian. The word for 40 (dyzet) means "two times 20". The Arbëreshë in Italy may use trizetë for 60. Formerly, katërzetë was also used for 80. Today Cham Albanians in Greece use all zet numbers. Basically, 20 means 1 zet, 40 means 2 zet, 60 means 3 zet and 80 means 4 zet. Albanian is the only language in the Balkans which has retained elements of the vigesimal numeral system side by side with decimal system. The existence of the two systems in Albanian reflect the contribution of Pre-Indo-European people of the Balkans to the formation of the Paleo-Balkan Indo-European tribes and their language.
- Twenty (hogei) is used as a base number in Basque for numbers up to 100 (ehun). The words for 40 (berrogei), 60 (hirurogei) and 80 (laurogei) mean "two-score", "three-score" and "four-score", respectively. For example, the number 75 is called hirurogeita hamabost, lit. "three-score-and ten-five". The Basque nationalist Sabino Arana proposed a vigesimal digit system to match the spoken language, and, as an alternative, a reform of the spoken language to make it decimal, but both are mostly forgotten.
- Twenty (dwisti or dwujsti) is used as a base number in the Resian dialect trïkrat dwisti (3×20), 70 by trïkrat dwisti nu dësat (3×20 + 10), 80 by štirikrat dwisti (4×20) and 90 by štirikrat dwisti nu dësat (4×20 + 10).
- In the £sd currency system (used in the United Kingdom pre-1971), there were 20 shillings (worth 12 pence each) to the pound. Under the decimal system introduced in 1971 (1 pound equals 100 new pence instead of 240 pence in the old system), the shilling coins still in circulation were re-valued at 5 pence (no more were minted and the shilling coin was demonetised in 1990).
- In the imperial weight system there are twenty hundredweight in a ton.
- In English, the name of the cardinal number 20 is most commonly phrased with the word 'twenty'. Counting by the score has been used historically; for example, the famous opening of the Gettysburg Address, "Four score and seven years ago...", refers to the signing of the Declaration of Independence in 1776, 87 years earlier. In the King James Bible, the term score is used over 130 times, though a single score is always expressed as "twenty". Score is still occasionally used to denote groups of 20 analogously to the use of dozen to quantify groups of 12.
- Other languages have terms similar to score, such as Danish and Norwegian snes.
- Even in regions where greater aspects of the Brythonic Celtic languages may be less apparent in modern dialect, sheep enumeration systems that are vigesimal are recalled to the present day. See Yan Tan Tethera.

=== Software applications ===
Open Location Code uses a word-safe version of base 20 for its geocodes. The characters in this alphabet were chosen to avoid accidentally forming words. The developers scored all possible sets of 20 letters in 30 different languages for likelihood of forming words, and chose a set that formed as few recognizable words as possible. The alphabet is also intended to reduce typographical errors by avoiding visually similar digits, and is case-insensitive.

Word-safe base 20
Base 20 digit	0	1	2	3	4	5	6	7	8	9	10	11	12	13	14	15	16	17	18	19
Code digit	2	3	4	5	6	7	8	9	C	F	G	H	J	M	P	Q	R	V	W	X

=== Related observations ===
- Among multiples of 10, 20 is described in a special way in some languages. For example, the Spanish words treinta (30) and cuarenta (40) consist of "tre(3)+inta (10 times)", "cuar(4)+enta (10 times)", but the word veinte (20) is not currently connected to any word meaning "two" (although historically it is). Similarly, in Semitic languages such as Arabic and Hebrew, the numbers 30, 40 ... 90 are expressed by morphologically plural forms of the words for the numbers 3, 4 ... 9, but the number 20 is expressed by a morphologically plural form of the word for 10. The Japanese language has a special word (hatachi) for 20 years (of age), and for the 20th day of the month (hatsuka).
- In some languages (e.g. English, Slavic languages and German), the names of the two-digit numbers from 11 to 19 consist of one word, but the names of the two-digit numbers from 21 on consist of two words. So for example, the English words eleven (11), twelve (12), thirteen (13) etc., as opposed to twenty-one (21), twenty-two (22), twenty-three (23), etc. In French, this is true up to 16. In a number of other languages (such as Hebrew), the names of the numbers from 11 to 19 contain two words, but one of these words is a special "teen" form, which is different from the ordinary form of the word for the number 10, and it may in fact be only found in these names of the numbers 11–19.
- Cantonese and Wu Chinese frequently use the single unit 廿 (Cantonese yàh, Shanghainese nyae or ne, Mandarin niàn) for twenty, in addition to the fully decimal 二十 (Cantonese yìh sàhp, Shanghainese el sah, Mandarin èr shí) which literally means "two ten". Equivalents exist for 30 and 40 (卅 and 卌 respectively: Mandarin sà and xì), but these are more seldom used. This is a historic remnant of a vigesimal system.
- Although Khmer numerals have represented a decimal positional notation system since at least the 7th century, Old Khmer, or Angkorian Khmer, also possessed separate symbols for the numbers 10, 20, and 100. Each multiple of 20 or 100 would require an additional stroke over the character, so the number 47 was constructed using the 20 symbol with an additional upper stroke, followed by the symbol for number 7. This suggests that spoken Angkorian Khmer used a vigesimal system.
- Thai uses the term ยี่สิบ (yi sip) for 20. Other multiples of ten consist of the base number, followed by the word for ten, e.g. สามสิบ (sam sip), lit. three ten, for thirty. The yi of yi sip is different from the number two in other positions, which is สอง (song). Nevertheless, yi sip is a loan word from Chinese.
- Lao similarly forms multiples of ten by putting the base number in front of the word ten, so ສາມສິບ (sam sip), litt. three ten, for thirty. The exception is twenty, for which the word ຊາວ (xao) is used. (ซาว sao is also used in the North-Eastern and Northern dialects of Thai, but not in standard Thai.)
- The Kharosthi numeral system behaves like a partial vigesimal system.

== Examples in Mesoamerican languages ==
=== Powers of twenty in Yucatec Maya and Nahuatl ===
Powers of twenty in Yucatec Maya and Nahuatl
Number	English	Maya	Nahuatl (modern orthography)	Classical Nahuatl	Nahuatl root	Aztec pictogram
1	One	Hun	Se	Ce	Ce
20	Twenty	K'áal	Sempouali	Cempohualli (Cempoalli)	Pohualli
400	Four hundred	Bak	Sentsontli	Centzontli	Tzontli
8,000	Eight thousand	Pic	Senxikipili	Cenxiquipilli	Xiquipilli
160,000	One hundred sixty thousand	Calab	Sempoualxikipili	Cempohualxiquipilli	Pohualxiquipilli
3,200,000	Three million two hundred thousand	Kinchil	Sentsonxikipili	Centzonxiquipilli	Tzonxiquipilli
64,000,000	Sixty-four million	Alau	Sempoualtzonxikipili	Cempohualtzonxiquipilli	Pohualtzonxiquipilli

=== Counting in units of twenty ===
This table shows the Maya numerals and the number names in Yucatec Maya, Nahuatl in modern orthography and in Classical Nahuatl.

From one to ten (1 – 10)
1 (one)	2 (two)	3 (three)	4 (four)	5 (five)	6 (six)	7 (seven)	8 (eight)	9 (nine)	10 (ten)
Hun	Ka'ah	Óox	Kan	Ho'	Wak	Uk	Waxak	Bolon	Lahun
Se	Ome	Yeyi	Naui	Makuili	Chikuasen	Chikome	Chikueyi	Chiknaui	Majtlaktli
Ce	Ome	Yei	Nahui	Macuilli	Chicuace	Chicome	Chicuei	Chicnahui	Matlactli
From eleven to twenty (11 – 20)
11	12	13	14	15	16	17	18	19	20
Buluk	Lahka'a	Óox lahun	Kan lahun	Ho' lahun	Wak lahun	Uk lahun	Waxak lahun	Bolon lahun	Hun k'áal
Majtlaktli onse	Majtlaktli omome	Majtlaktli omeyi	Majtlaktli onnaui	Kaxtoli	Kaxtoli onse	Kaxtoli omome	Kaxtoli omeyi	Kaxtoli onnaui	Sempouali
Matlactli huan ce	Matlactli huan ome	Matlactli huan yei	Matlactli huan nahui	Caxtolli	Caxtolli huan ce	Caxtolli huan ome	Caxtolli huan yei	Caxtolli huan nahui	Cempohualli
From twenty-one to thirty (21 – 30)
21	22	23	24	25	26	27	28	29	30
Hump'éel katak hun k'áal	Ka'ah katak hun k'áal	Óox katak hun k'áal	Kan katak hun k'áal	Ho' katak hun k'áal	Wak katak hun k'áal	Uk katak hun k'áal	Waxak katak hun k'áal	Bolon katak hun k'áal	Lahun katak hun k'áal
Sempouali onse	Sempouali omome	Sempouali omeyi	Sempouali onnaui	Sempouali ommakuili	Sempouali onchikuasen	Sempouali onchikome	Sempouali onchikueyi	Sempouali onchiknaui	Sempouali ommajtlaktli
Cempohualli huan ce	Cempohualli huan ome	Cempohualli huan yei	Cempohualli huan nahui	Cempohualli huan macuilli	Cempohualli huan chicuace	Cempohualli huan chicome	Cempohualli huan chicuei	Cempohualli huan chicnahui	Cempohualli huan matlactli
From thirty-one to forty (31 – 40)
31	32	33	34	35	36	37	38	39	40
Buluk katak hun k'áal	Lahka'a katak hun k'áal	Óox lahun katak hun k'áal	Kan lahun katak hun k'áal	Ho' lahun katak hun k'áal	Wak lahun katak hun k'áal	Uk lahun katak hun k'áal	Waxak lahun katak hun k'áal	Bolon lahun katak hun k'áal	Ka' k'áal
Sempouali ommajtlaktli onse	Sempouali ommajtlaktli omome	Sempouali ommajtlaktli omeyi	Sempouali ommajtlaktli onnaui	Sempouali onkaxtoli	Sempouali onkaxtoli onse	Sempouali onkaxtoli omome	Sempouali onkaxtoli omeyi	Sempouali onkaxtoli onnaui	Ompouali
Cempohualli huan matlactli huan ce	Cempohualli huan matlactli huan ome	Cempohualli huan matlactli huan yei	Cempohualli huan matlactli huan nahui	Cempohualli huan caxtolli	Cempohualli huan caxtolli huan ce	Cempohualli huan caxtolli huan ome	Cempohualli huan caxtolli huan yei	Cempohualli huan caxtolli huan nahui	Ompohualli
From twenty to two hundred in steps of twenty (20 – 200)
20	40	60	80	100	120	140	160	180	200
Hun k'áal	Ka' k'áal	Óox k'áal	Kan k'áal	Ho' k'áal	Wak k'áal	Uk k'áal	Waxak k'áal	Bolon k'áal	Lahun k'áal
Sempouali	Ompouali	Yepouali	Naupouali	Makuilpouali	Chikuasempouali	Chikompouali	Chikuepouali	Chiknaupouali	Majtlakpouali
Cempohualli	Ompohualli	Yeipohualli	Nauhpohualli	Macuilpohualli	Chicuacepohualli	Chicomepohualli	Chicueipohualli	Chicnahuipohualli	Matlacpohualli
From two hundred twenty to four hundred in steps of twenty (220 – 400)
220	240	260	280	300	320	340	360	380	400
Buluk k'áal	Lahka'a k'áal	Óox lahun k'áal	Kan lahun k'áal	Ho' lahun k'áal	Wak lahun k'áal	Uk lahun k'áal	Waxak lahun k'áal	Bolon lahun k'áal	Hun bak
Majtlaktli onse pouali	Majtlaktli omome pouali	Majtlaktli omeyi pouali	Majtlaktli onnaui pouali	Kaxtolpouali	Kaxtolli onse pouali	Kaxtolli omome pouali	Kaxtolli omeyi pouali	Kaxtolli onnaui pouali	Sentsontli
Matlactli huan ce pohualli	Matlactli huan ome pohualli	Matlactli huan yei pohualli	Matlactli huan nahui pohualli	Caxtolpohualli	Caxtolli huan ce pohualli	Caxtolli huan ome pohualli	Caxtolli huan yei pohualli	Caxtolli huan nahui pohualli	Centzontli

== Sources ==
- Chrisomalis, Stephen (2010-01-18). Numerical Notation: A Comparative History. Cambridge University Press. pp. 135–136. ISBN 978-0-521-87818-0.
