= 32 (number) =

← 31	32	33 →
- ← 30 31 32 33 34 35 36 37 38 39 →: List of numbers; Integers; ← 0 10 20 30 40 50 60 70 80 90 →
- Cardinal: thirty-two
- Ordinal: 32nd (thirty-second)
- Factorization: 2^{5}
- Divisors: 1, 2, 4, 8, 16, 32
- Greek numeral: ΛΒ´
- Roman numeral: XXXII, xxxii
- Binary: 100000_{2}
- Ternary: 1012_{3}
- Senary: 52_{6}
- Octal: 40_{8}
- Duodecimal: 28_{12}
- Hexadecimal: 20_{16}
- ASCII value: [space]

32 (thirty-two) is the natural number following 31 and preceding 33.

== Mathematics ==
32 is the fifth power of two ($2^{5}$), making it the first non-unitary fifth-power of the form $p^{5}$ where $p$ is prime. 32 is the totient summatory function $\Phi(n)$ over the first 10 integers, and the smallest number $n$ with exactly 7 solutions for $\varphi (n)$.

The aliquot sum of a power of two is always one less than the number itself, therefore the aliquot sum of 32 is 31.

$$\begin{align}
32 & = 1^{1} + 2^{2} + 3^{3} \\
32 & = (1\times4)+(2\times5)+(3\times6) \\
32 & = (1\times2)+(1\times2\times3)+(1\times2\times3\times4) \\
32 & = (1\times2\times3)+(4\times5)+(6)
\end{align}$$

The product between neighbor numbers of 23, the dual permutation of the digits of 32 in decimal, is equal to the sum of the first 32 integers: $22 \times 24= 528$. (Note: 32 is the ninth 10-happy number, while 23 is the sixth. Their sum is 55, which is the tenth triangular number, while their difference is $9 = 3^{2}.$)

32 is also a Leyland number expressible in the form $x^y + y^x$, where: (Note: On the other hand, a regular 32-sided triacontadigon contains $2^{3} + 3^{2} = 17$ distinct symmetries. For comparison, a 16-sided hexadecagon contains 14 symmetries, an 8-sided octagon contains 11 symmetries, and a square contains 8 symmetries.)
$$32=2^{4} + 4^{2}.$$

The eleventh Mersenne number is the first to have a prime exponent (11) that does not yield a Mersenne prime, equal to: (Note: Specifically, 31 is the eleventh prime number, equal to the sum of 20 and its composite index 11, where 33 is the twenty-first composite number, equal to the sum of 21 and its composite index 12 (which are palindromic numbers). 32 is the only number to lie between two adjacent numbers whose values can be directly evaluated from sums of associated prime and composite indices (32 is the twentieth composite number, which maps to 31 through its prime index of 11, and 33 by a factor of 11, that is the composite index of 20; the aliquot part of 32 is 31 as well). This is due to the fact that the ratio of composites to primes increases very rapidly, by the prime number theorem.)
$$2047 = 32^{2} + (31 \times 33) = 1024 + 1023 = 2^{11} - 1.$$

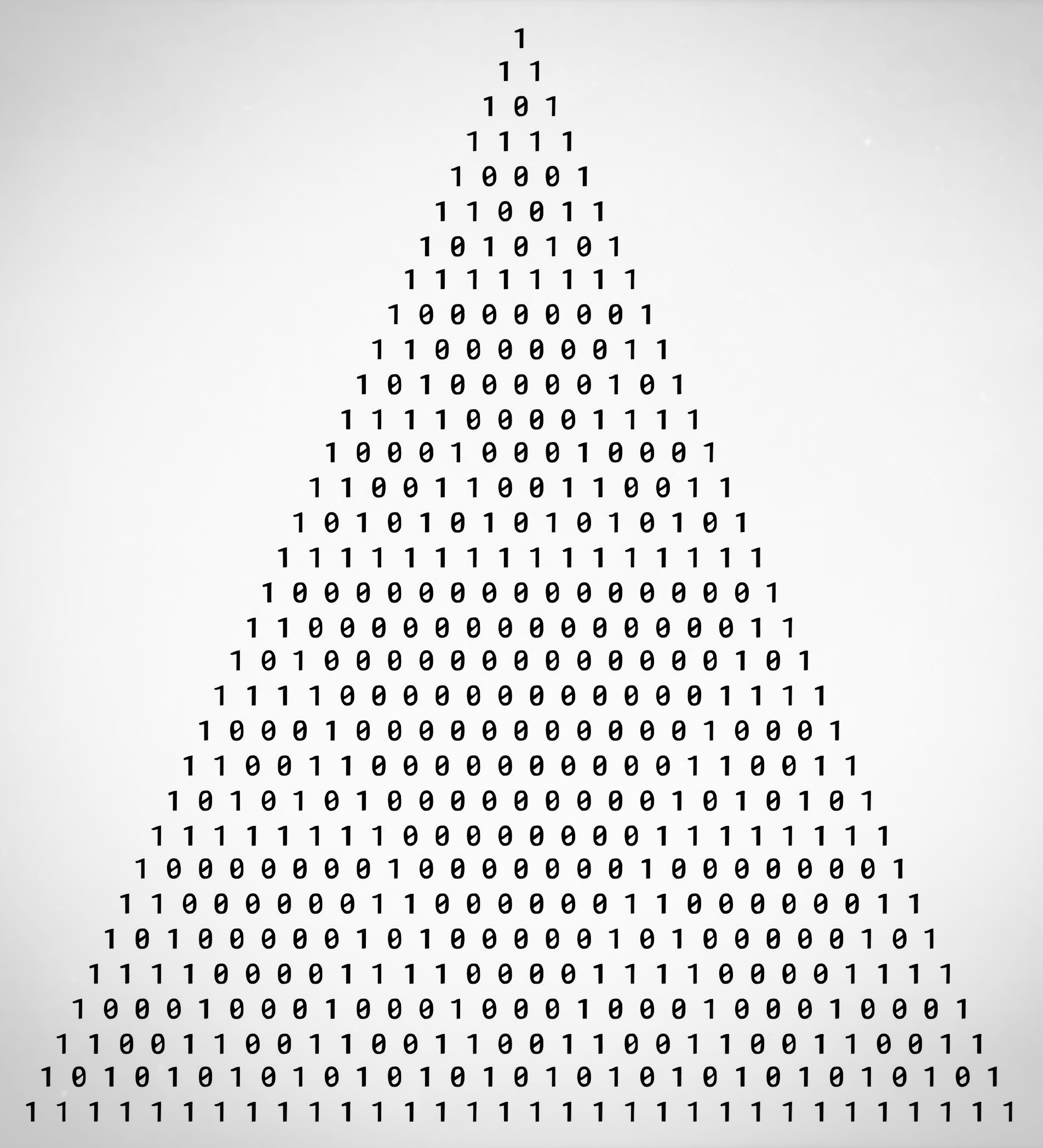
When read in binary, the first 32 rows of Pascal's Triangle represent the thirty-two divisors that belong to the largest known constructible polygon with an odd number of sides.

The product of the five known Fermat primes is equal to the number of sides of the largest known regular constructible polygon with a straightedge and compass that has an odd number of sides, with a total of sides numbering
$$2^{32} - 1 = 3\cdot5\cdot17\cdot257\cdot65\;537 = 4\;294\;967\;295.$$

The first 32 rows of Pascal's triangle read as single binary numbers represent the 32 divisors that belong to this number, which is also the number of sides of all known odd-sided constructible polygons with simple tools alone (if the monogon is also included).

There are also a total of 32 uniform colorings to the 11 regular and semiregular tilings.

There are 32 three-dimensional crystallographic point groups and 32 five-dimensional crystal families, and the maximum determinant in a 7 by 7 matrix of only zeroes and ones is 32. In sixteen dimensions, the sedenions generate a non-commutative loop $\mathbb {S}_{L}$ of order 32, and in thirty-two dimensions, there are at least 1,160,000,000 even unimodular lattices (of determinants 1 or −1); which is a marked increase from the twenty-four such Niemeier lattices that exists in twenty-four dimensions, or the single $\mathrm E_{8}$ lattice in eight dimensions (these lattices only exist for dimensions $d \propto 8$). Furthermore, the 32nd dimension is the first dimension that holds non-critical even unimodular lattices that do not interact with a Gaussian potential function of the form $f_{\alpha} (r) = e^{-\alpha {r}}$ of root $r$ and $\alpha > 0$.

32 is the furthest point in the set of natural numbers $\mathbb {N}_{0}$ where the ratio of primes (2, 3, 5, ..., 31) to non-primes (0, 1, 4, ..., 32) is $\tfrac {1}{2}.$ (Note: 29 is the only earlier point, where there are twenty non-primes, and ten primes. 40 — twice the composite index of 32 — lies between the 8th pair of sexy primes (37, 43), which represent the only two points in the set of natural numbers where the ratio of prime numbers to composite numbers (up to) is 1/2. Where 68 is the forty-eighth composite, 48 is the thirty second, with the difference 68 – 48 = 20, the composite index of 32. Otherwise, thirty-two lies midway between primes (23, 41), (17, 47) and (3, 61). At 33, there are 11 numbers that are prime and 22 that are not, when considering instead the set of natural numbers $\mathbb{N}^+$ that does not include 0. The product 11 × 33 = 363 represents the thirty-second number to return 0 for the Mertens function M(n).)

The trigintaduonions form a 32-dimensional hypercomplex number system.
