= 2 =

Natural number

← 1	2	3 →
- −1 0 1 2 3 4 5 6 7 8 9 →: List of numbers; Integers; ← 0 10 20 30 40 50 60 70 80 90 →
- Cardinal: two
- Ordinal: 2nd (second)
- Numeral system: binary
- Factorization: prime
- Gaussian integer factorization: $(1 + i)(1 - i)$
- Prime: 1st
- Divisors: 1, 2
- Greek numeral: Β´
- Roman numeral: II, ii
- Greek prefix: di-
- Latin prefix: duo-/bi-
- Old English prefix: twi-
- Binary: 10_{2}
- Ternary: 2_{3}
- Senary: 2_{6}
- Octal: 2_{8}
- Duodecimal: 2_{12}
- Hexadecimal: 2_{16}
- Arabic, Kurdish, Persian, Sindhi, Urdu: ٢
- Ge'ez: ፪
- Bengali: ২
- Chinese numeral: 二，弍，貳
- Devanāgarī: २
- Santali: ᱒
- Tamil: ௨
- Kannada: ೨
- Hebrew: ב
- Armenian: Բ
- Khmer: ២
- Maya numerals: ••
- Thai: ๒
- Georgian: Ⴁ/ⴁ/ბ(Bani)
- Malayalam: ൨
- Babylonian numeral: 𒐖
- Egyptian hieroglyph, Aegean numeral, Chinese counting rod: ||
- Morse code: .._ _ _

2 (two) is a number, numeral and digit. It is the natural number following 1 and preceding 3. It is the smallest and the only even prime number.

Because it forms the basis of a duality, it has religious and spiritual significance in many cultures.

== Mathematics ==
The number 2 is the second natural number, after 1. Each natural number, including 2, is constructed by succession, that is, by adding 1 to the previous natural number. 2 is the smallest and the only even prime number, and the first Ramanujan prime. It is also the first superior highly composite number, and the first colossally abundant number.

An integer is determined to be even if it is divisible by two. When written in base 10, all multiples of 2 will end in 0, 2, 4, 6, or 8; more generally, in any even base, even numbers will end with an even digit.

Binary is a number system with a base of two, where each "bit" (binary digit) is either 0 (off) or 1 (on). It is used extensively in computing, since simple on-off logic is relatively simple to keep track of with electronics.

A digon is a polygon with two sides (or edges) and two vertices. In Euclidean space, digons are degenerate, collapsing to a line segment between the two vertices. In spherical geometry, however, non-degenerate digons can exist.

Two distinct points in a plane are always sufficient to define a unique line in a nontrivial Euclidean space.

The integers modulo 2 form the finite field $\mathbb F_2$, the smallest finite field. It has two elements, usually denoted 0 and 1, and addition in $\mathbb F_2$ corresponds to parity. Thus reduction modulo 2 records the parity of an integer: even integers are congruent to 0 modulo 2, and odd integers are congruent to 1 modulo 2. In algebra, structures of characteristic 2 have special behavior because $1+1=0$; in particular, every element satisfies $x=-x$. For this reason, many algebraic constructions have separate forms in characteristic 2.

A symmetry of order two is called an involution.

=== List of basic calculations ===
Multiplication	1	2	3	4	5	6	7	8	9	10	11	12	13	14	15	16	20	25	50	100	1000
2 * x	2	4	6	8	10	12	14	16	18	20	22	24	26	28	30	32	40	50	100	200	2000

Division	1	2	3	4	5	6	7	8	9	10	11	12
2 ÷ x	2	1	0.6̅	0.5	0.4	0.3̅	0.2̅8̅5̅7̅1̅4̅	0.25	0.2̅	0.2	0.1̅8̅	0.1̅6̅
x ÷ 2	0.5	1	1.5	2	2.5	3	3.5	4	4.5	5	5.5	6

Division	13	14	15	16	17	18	19	20
2 ÷ x	0.1̅5̅3̅8̅4̅6̅	0.1̅4̅2̅8̅5̅7̅	0.13̅	0.125	0.1̅1̅7̅6̅4̅7̅0̅5̅8̅8̅2̅3̅5̅2̅9̅4̅	0.1̅	0.1̅0̅5̅2̅6̅3̅1̅5̅7̅8̅9̅4̅7̅3̅6̅8̅4̅2̅	0.1
x ÷ 2	6.5	7	7.5	8	8.5	9	9.5	10

Exponentiation	1	2	3	4	5	6	7	8	9	10	11	12
2^{x}	2	4	8	16	32	64	128	256	512	1024	2048	4096
x^{2}	1	4	9	16	25	36	49	64	81	100	121	144

Exponentiation	13	14	15	16	17	18	19	20
2^{x}	8192	16384	32768	65536	131072	262144	524288	1048576
x^{2}	169	196	225	256	289	324	361	400

== As a word ==
Two is most commonly a determiner used with plural countable nouns, as in two days or I'll take these two. Two is a noun when it refers to the number two as in two plus two is four.

The word two is derived from the Old English words twā (feminine), tū (neuter), and twēġen (masculine, which survives today in the form twain).

== Evolution of the Arabic digit ==

The digit used in the modern Western world to represent the number 2 traces its roots back to the Indic Brahmic script, where "2" was written as two horizontal lines. The modern Chinese and Japanese languages (and Korean Hanja) still use this method. The Gupta script rotated the two lines 45 degrees, making them diagonal. The top line was sometimes also shortened and had its bottom end curve towards the center of the bottom line. In the Nagari script, the top line was written more like a curve connecting to the bottom line. In the Arabic Ghubar writing, the bottom line was completely vertical, and the digit looked like a dotless closing question mark. Restoring the bottom line to its original horizontal position, but keeping the top line as a curve that connects to the bottom line leads to our modern digit.

== In science ==
- The first magic number - number of electrons in the innermost electron shell of an atom.
- The chemical element with atomic number 2 is helium.

== See also ==
- Binary number
- Square root of 2
- −2
