= 29 (number) =

| ← 28 | 29 | 30 → |
- ← 20 21 22 23 24 25 26 27 28 29 →: List of numbers; Integers; ← 0 10 20 30 40 50 60 70 80 90 →
- Cardinal: twenty-nine
- Ordinal: 29th (twenty-ninth)
- Factorization: prime
- Prime: 10th
- Divisors: 1, 29
- Greek numeral: ΚΘ´
- Roman numeral: XXIX, xxix
- Binary: 11101_{2}
- Ternary: 1002_{3}
- Senary: 45_{6}
- Octal: 35_{8}
- Duodecimal: 25_{12}
- Hexadecimal: 1D_{16}

29 (twenty-nine) is the natural number following 28 and preceding 30. It is a prime number.

29 is the number of days February has on a leap year.

== Mathematics ==
=== Integer properties ===
29 is the tenth prime number. It forms a twin prime pair with 31.

29 is the fifth primorial prime, the sixth Sophie Germain prime, a Lucas prime, a Pell prime, and an Eisenstein prime with no imaginary part and real part of the form 3n − 1.

Additionally, 29 represents the sum of the first cluster of consecutive semiprimes with distinct prime factors (14, 15). These two numbers are the only numbers whose arithmetic mean of divisors is the first perfect number and unitary perfect number, 6 (that is also the smallest semiprime with distinct factors). The pair (14, 15) is also the first floor and ceiling values of imaginary parts of non-trivial zeroes in the Riemann zeta function, $\zeta.$

29 is the largest prime factor of the smallest number with an abundancy index of 3,

1018976683725 = 3^{3} × 5^{2} × 7^{2} × 11 × 13 × 17 × 19 × 23 × 29 (sequence A047802 in the OEIS)

It is also the largest prime factor of the smallest abundant number not divisible by the first even (of only one) and odd primes, 5391411025 = 5^{2} × 7 × 11 × 13 × 17 × 19 × 23 × 29. Both of these numbers are divisible by consecutive prime numbers ending in 29.

29 is the smallest positive whole number that cannot be made from the numbers $\{1, 2, 3, 4\}$, using each digit exactly once and using only addition, subtraction, multiplication, and division. None of the first twenty-nine natural numbers have more than two different prime factors. This is the longest such consecutive sequence. The first sphenic number or triprime, 30 is the product of the first three primes 2, 3, and 5).

29 is a tetranacci number and a Perrin number, preceded in the sequence by 12, 17, 22.

29 is also a Markov number, appearing in the solutions to x^{2} + y^{2} + z^{2} = 3xyz: {2, 5, 29}, {2, 29, 169}, {5, 29, 433}, {29, 169, 14701}, etc.

29 is the sum of three consecutive squares, 2^{2} + 3^{2} + 4^{2}.

There are 29 pentacubes if reflections are considered distinct.

==== 15 and 290 theorems ====
The 15 and 290 theorems describes integer-quadratic matrices that describe all positive integers, by the set of the first fifteen integers, or equivalently, the first two-hundred and ninety integers. Alternatively, a more precise version states that an integer quadratic matrix represents all positive integers when it contains the set of twenty-nine integers between 1 and 290:

$$\{1, 2, 3, 5, 6, 7, 10, 13, 14, 15, 17, 19, 21, 22, 23, 26, 29, 30, 31, 34, 35, 37, 42, 58, 93, 110, 145, 203, 290\}$$

The largest member 290 is the product between 29 and its index in the sequence of prime numbers, 10. The largest member in this sequence is also the twenty-fifth even, square-free sphenic number with three distinct prime numbers $p \times q \times r$ as factors, and the fifteenth such that $p + q + r + 1$ is prime (where in its case, 2 + 5 + 29 + 1 = 37). (Note: In this sequence, 29 is the seventeenth indexed member, where the sum of the largest two members (203, 290) is $17 \times 29 = 493$. Furthermore, 290 is the sum of the squares of divisors of 17, or 289 + 1.)

=== Dimensional spaces ===
The 29th dimension is the highest dimension for compact hyperbolic Coxeter polytopes that are bounded by a fundamental polyhedron, and the highest dimension that holds arithmetic discrete groups of reflections with noncompact unbounded fundamental polyhedra.

29 is the tenth supersingular prime.
