= 27 (number) =

← 26	27	28 →
- ← 20 21 22 23 24 25 26 27 28 29 →: List of numbers; Integers; ← 0 10 20 30 40 50 60 70 80 90 →
- Cardinal: twenty-seven
- Ordinal: 27th
- Factorization: 3^{3}
- Divisors: 1, 3, 9, 27
- Greek numeral: ΚΖ´
- Roman numeral: XXVII, xxvii
- Binary: 11011_{2}
- Ternary: 1000_{3}
- Senary: 43_{6}
- Octal: 33_{8}
- Duodecimal: 23_{12}
- Hexadecimal: 1B_{16}

27 (twenty-seven) is the natural number following 26 and preceding 28.

== Mathematics ==
Including the null-motif, there are 27 distinct hypergraph motifs.

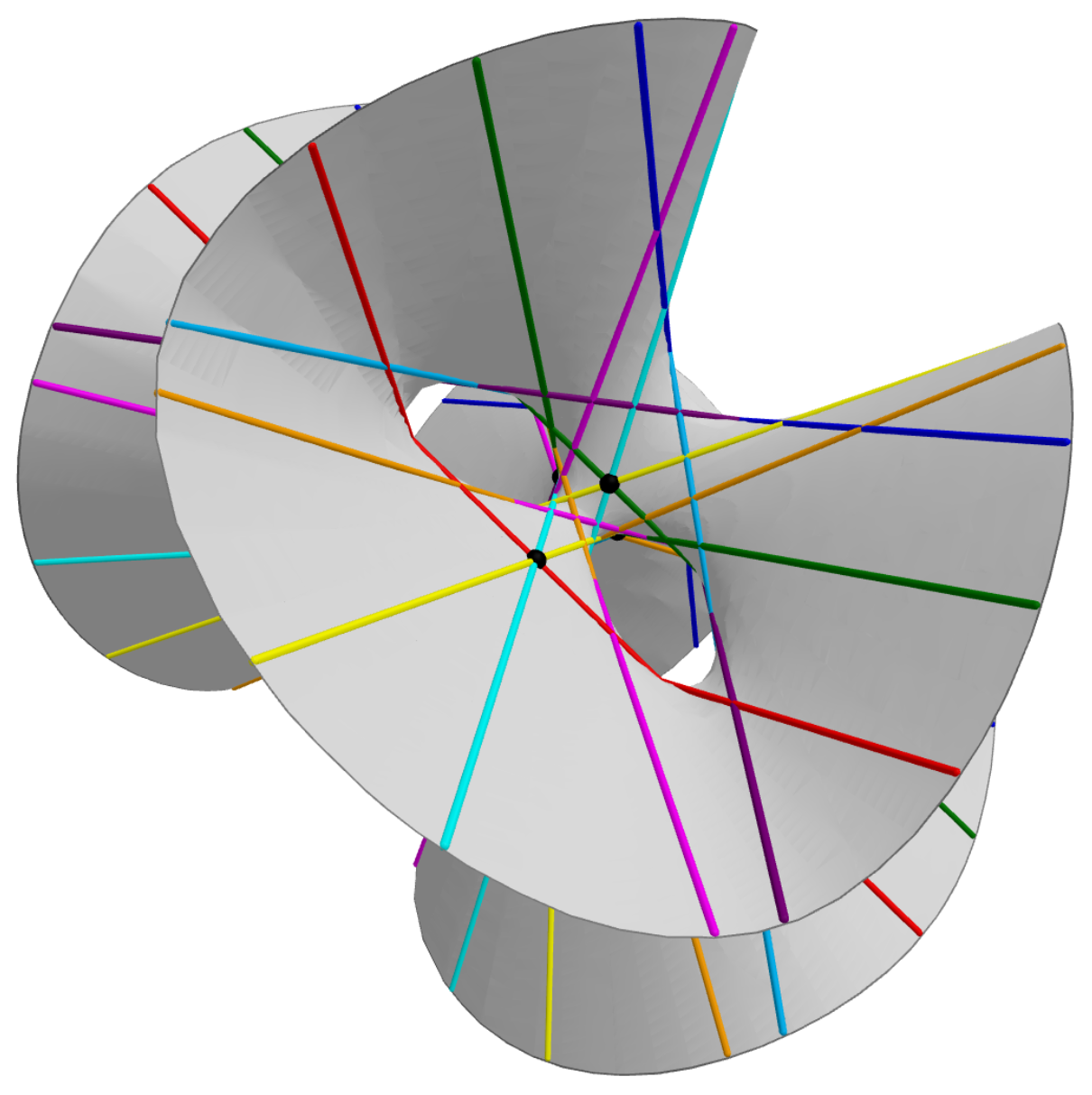
The Clebsch surface, with 27 straight lines

There are exactly twenty-seven straight lines on a smooth cubic surface, which give a basis of the fundamental representation of Lie algebra $\mathrm {E_{6}}$.

The unique simple formally real Jordan algebra, the exceptional Jordan algebra of self-adjoint 3 by 3 matrices of quaternions, is 27-dimensional; its automorphism group is the 52-dimensional exceptional Lie algebra $\mathrm {F_{4}}.$

There are twenty-seven sporadic groups, if the non-strict group of Lie type $\mathrm {T}$ (with an irreducible representation that is twice that of $\mathrm {F_{4}}$ in 104 dimensions) is included.

In Robin's theorem for the Riemann hypothesis, twenty-seven integers fail to hold $\sigma(n) < e^\gamma n \log \log n$ for values $n \leq 5040,$ where $\gamma$ is the Euler–Mascheroni constant; this hypothesis is true if and only if this inequality holds for every larger $n.$

The Clebsch surface has 27 exceptional lines can be defined over the real numbers.

It is possible to arrange 27 vertices and connect them with edges to create the Holt graph.

Because 27 = 3^{3}, 27 is the second tetration of 3 (^{2}3).

== In other fields ==
- The 27 club refers to the age when many popular music figures died.
- The 27th of each month is a special day for Catholics around the world as they commemorate and particularly pray to the Virgin of the Miraculous Medal, whose main feast day is celebrated on November 27.

== See also ==
- Cube (algebra)
- "Weird Al" Yankovic § Recurring themes for his frequent use of the number
