= 21 (number) =

Natural number

← 20	21	22 →
- ← 20 21 22 23 24 25 26 27 28 29 →: List of numbers; Integers; ← 0 10 20 30 40 50 60 70 80 90 →
- Cardinal: twenty-one
- Ordinal: 21st (twenty-first)
- Factorization: 3 × 7
- Divisors: 1, 3, 7, 21
- Greek numeral: ΚΑ´
- Roman numeral: XXI, xxi
- Binary: 10101_{2}
- Ternary: 210_{3}
- Senary: 33_{6}
- Octal: 25_{8}
- Duodecimal: 19_{12}
- Hexadecimal: 15_{16}

21 (twenty-one) is the natural number following 20 and preceding 22.

The current century is the 21st century AD, under the Gregorian calendar.

== Mathematics ==
Twenty-one is the fifth distinct semiprime, and the second of the form $3 \times q$ where $q$ is a higher prime. It is a repdigit in quaternary (111_{4}).

=== Properties ===
As a semiprime with proper divisors 1, 3 and 7, twenty-one has a prime aliquot sum of 11 within an aliquot sequence containing only one composite number (21, 11, 1, 0). 21 is the first member of the second cluster of consecutive discrete semiprimes (21, 22), where the next such cluster is (33, 34, 35). There are 21 prime numbers with 2 digits. There are a total of 21 prime numbers between 100 and 200.

21 is the first Blum integer, since it is a semiprime with both its prime factors being Gaussian primes.

While 21 is the sixth triangular number, it is also the sum of the divisors of the first five positive integers:

$$\begin{align}
1 & + 2 + 3 + 4 + 5 + 6 = 21 \\
1 & + (1 + 2) + (1 + 3) + (1 + 2 + 4) + (1 + 5) = 21 \\
\end{align}$$

21 is also the first non-trivial octagonal number. It is the fifth Motzkin number, and the seventeenth Padovan number (preceded by the terms 9, 12, and 16, where it is the sum of the first two of these).

21 is the smallest natural number that is not close to a power of two $(2^n)$, where the range of nearness is $\pm {n}.$

In decimal, 21 is the fourteenth Harshad number. It is the smallest non-trivial example in base ten of a Fibonacci number (where 21 is the 8th member, as the sum of the preceding terms in the sequence 8 and 13) whose digits (2, 1) are Fibonacci numbers and whose digit sum is also a Fibonacci number (3). It is also the largest positive integer $n$ in decimal such that for any positive integers $a,b$ where $a + b = n$, at least one of $\tfrac{a}{b}$ and $\tfrac{b}{a}$ is a terminating decimal; see proof below:

Proof

For any $a$ coprime to $n$ and $n - a$, the condition above holds when one of $a$ and $n - a$ only has factors $2$ and $5$ (for a representation in base ten).

Let $A(n)$ denote the quantity of the numbers smaller than $n$ that only have factor $2$ and $5$ and that are coprime to $n$, we instantly have $\frac{\varphi(n)}{2} < A(n)$.

We can easily see that for sufficiently large $n$, $A(n) \sim \frac{\log_2(n) \log_5(n)}{2} = \frac{\ln^{2}(n)}{2 \ln(2) \ln(5)}.$

However, $\varphi(n) \sim \frac {n} {e^\gamma\; \ln \ln n}$ where $A(n) = o(\varphi(n))$ as $n$ approaches infinity; thus $\frac{\varphi(n)}{2} < A(n)$ fails to hold for sufficiently large $n$.

In fact, for every $n > 2$, we have

$A(n)< 1 + \log_2(n) + \frac{3 \log_5(n)}{2} + \frac{\log_2(n) \log_5(n)}{2} \text { }$ and
$$\varphi(n) > \frac {n} {e^\gamma\; \log \log n + \frac {3} {\log \log n}}.$$

So $\frac{\varphi(n)}{2} < A(n)$ fails to hold when $n > 273$ (actually, when $n > 33$).

Just check a few numbers to see that the complete sequence of numbers having this property is $\{2, 3, 4, 5, 6, 7, 8, 9, 11, 12, 15, 21\}.$

==== Squaring the square ====
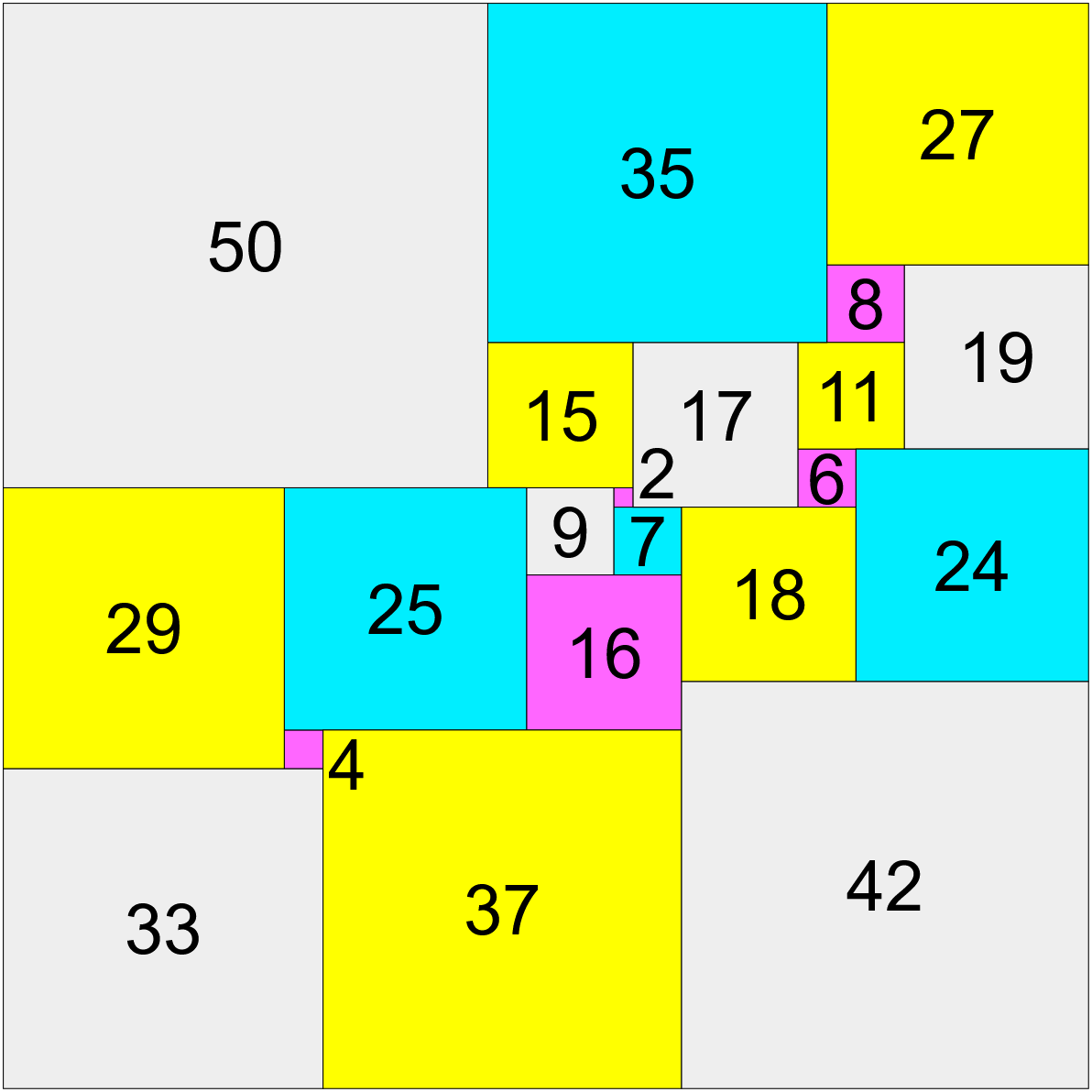
The minimum number of squares needed to square the square (using different edge-lengths) is 21.

Twenty-one is the smallest number of differently sized squares needed to square the square.

The lengths of sides of these squares are:$\{2,4,6,7,8,9,11,15,16,17,18,19,24,25,27,29,33,35,37,42,50\}$ which generate a sum of 427 when excluding a square of side length $7$; (Note: This square of side length 7 is adjacent to both the "central square" with side length of 9, and the smallest square of side length 2.) this sum represents the largest square-free integer over a quadratic field of class number two, where 163 is the largest such (Heegner) number of class one.

=== Quadratic matrices in Z ===
The twenty-first prime number 73 is the largest member of Bhargava's definite quadratic 17–integer matrix $\Phi_{s}(P)$ representative of all prime numbers:
$$\Phi_{s}(P) = \{2, 3, 5, 7, 11, 13, 17, 19, 23, 29, 31, 37, 41, 43, 47, 67, \mathbf {73} \},$$

The twenty-first composite number 33 is the largest member of a like definite quadratic 7–integer matrix,
$$\Phi_{s}(2\mathbb {Z} _{\ge 0} + 1) = \{1, 3, 5, 7, 11, 15, \mathbf {33} \}$$

representative of all odd numbers. (Note: On the other hand, the largest member of an integer quadratic matrix representative of all numbers is 15, $$\Phi_{s}(\mathbb {Z} _{\ge 0}) = \{1, 2, 3, 5, 6, 7, 10, 14, \mathbf {15} \}$$ where the aliquot sum of 33 is 15, the second such number to have this sum after 16 (A001065); see also, 15 and 290 theorems. In this sequence, the sum of all members is $63 = 3 \times 21.$)

== Age 21 ==
- In thirteen countries, 21 is the age of majority. See also: Coming of age.
- In eight countries, 21 is the minimum age to purchase tobacco products.
- In seventeen countries, 21 is the drinking age.
- In nine countries, it is the voting age.
- In the United States:
  - 21 is the minimum age at which a person may gamble or enter casinos in most states (since alcohol is usually provided).
  - 21 is the minimum age to purchase a handgun or handgun ammunition under federal law.
  - In some states, 21 is the minimum age to accompany a learner driver, provided that the person supervising the learner has held a full driver license for a specified amount of time. See also: List of minimum driving ages.

== In sports ==
In NASCAR, 21 has been used by Wood Brothers Racing and Ford for decades. The team has won 99 NASCAR Cup Series races, a majority with 21, and 5 Daytona 500s.

== In other fields ==
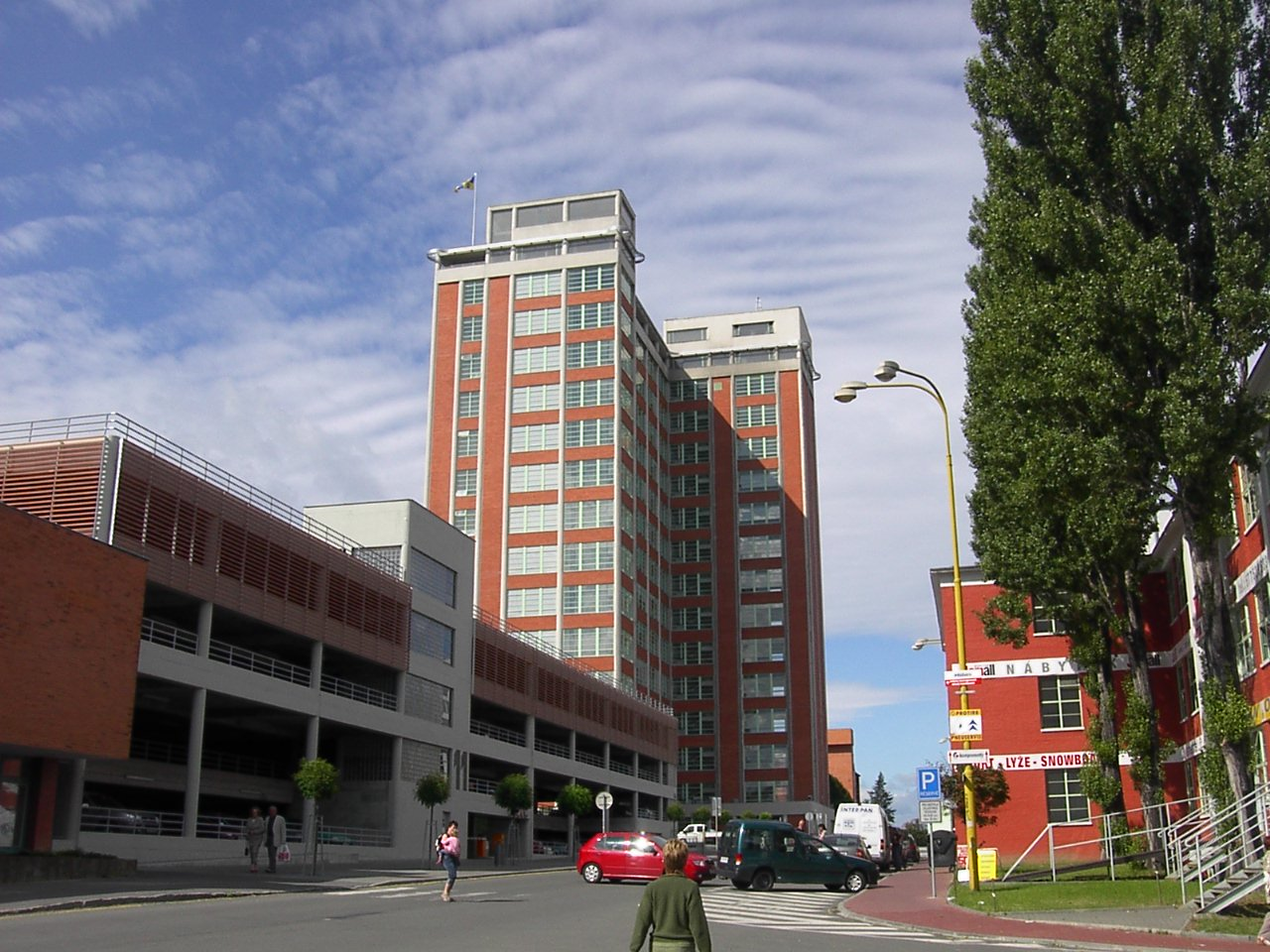
Building called "21" in Zlín, Czech Republic.

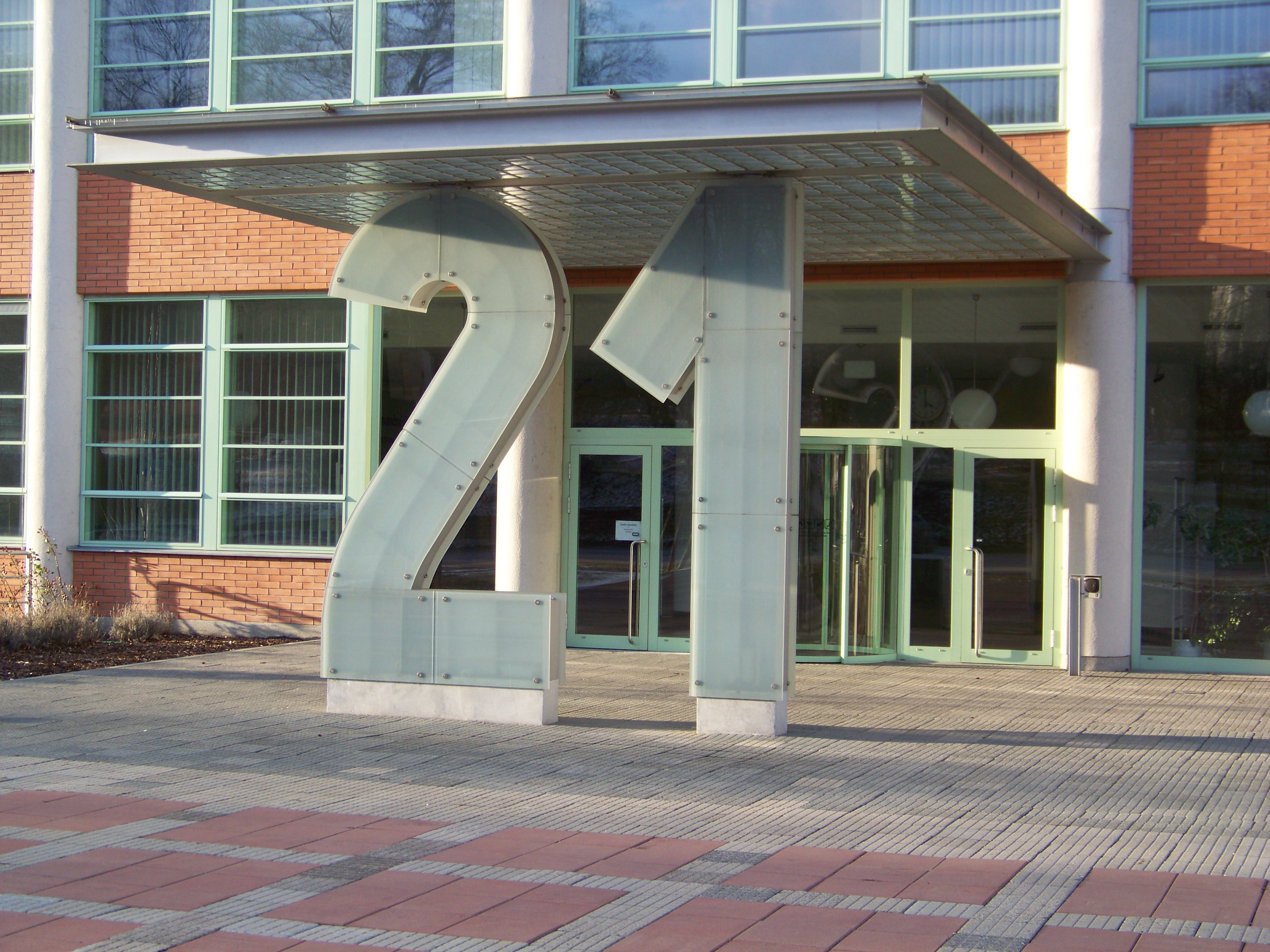
Detail of the building entrance.

There are 21 shillings in a guinea.

There are 21 firings in a 21-gun salute honoring royalty or leaders of countries.

21 is associated with the profile 21 (in Israel, the military profile designation granting an exemption from the military service).

21 is a crucial number in a family of card games like twenty-one or blackjack.
