= 28 (number) =

← 27	28	29 →
- ← 20 21 22 23 24 25 26 27 28 29 →: List of numbers; Integers; ← 0 10 20 30 40 50 60 70 80 90 →
- Cardinal: twenty-eight
- Ordinal: 28th (twenty-eighth)
- Factorization: 2^{2} × 7
- Divisors: 1, 2, 4, 7, 14, 28
- Greek numeral: ΚΗ´
- Roman numeral: XXVIII, xxviii
- Binary: 11100_{2}
- Ternary: 1001_{3}
- Senary: 44_{6}
- Octal: 34_{8}
- Duodecimal: 24_{12}
- Hexadecimal: 1C_{16}

28 (twenty-eight) is the natural number following 27 and preceding 29.

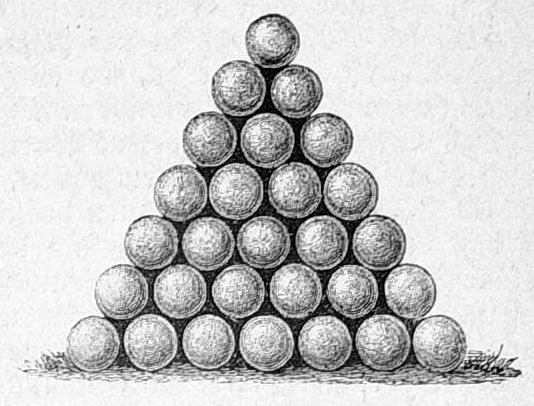
The number 28 depicted as 28 balls arranged in a triangular pattern with the number of layers of 7

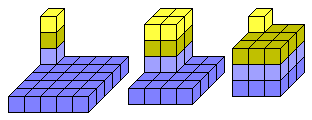
28 as the sum of four nonzero squares.

28 is a composite number, a perfect number, a harmonic divisor number, a centered nonagonal number, a hexagonal number, a happy number, and a triangular number.

28 also appears in the Padovan sequence.

In algebraic geometry, 28 is the number of bitangents to a general plane quartic curve.

== In science ==
28 is the fourth magic number in physics. It is also the atomic number of the element Nickel.
