= 24 (number) =

← 23	24	25 →
- ← 20 21 22 23 24 25 26 27 28 29 →: List of numbers; Integers; ← 0 10 20 30 40 50 60 70 80 90 →
- Cardinal: Twenty-four
- Ordinal: 24th
- Numeral system: tetravigesimal
- Factorization: 2^{3} × 3
- Divisors: 1, 2, 3, 4, 6, 8, 12, 24
- Greek numeral: ΚΔ´
- Roman numeral: XXIV, xxiv
- Binary: 11000_{2}
- Ternary: 220_{3}
- Senary: 40_{6}
- Octal: 30_{8}
- Duodecimal: 20_{12}
- Hexadecimal: 18_{16}

24 (twenty-four) is the natural number following 23 and preceding 25. It is equal to two dozen and one sixth of a gross.

== In mathematics ==
24 is the number of permutations of four items. Thus it is the order of the symmetric group on four symbols, and is the factorial of 4. This is the full symmetry group of the regular tetrahedron, and also the rotational symmetry group of the cube (or octahedron).

24 is an even composite number, a highly composite number, an abundant number, a practical number, a congruent number, and the first Erdős–Nicolas number. The many ways 24 can be constructed inspired a children's mathematical game involving the use of any of the four standard operations on four numbers on a card to get 24.

24 is also part of the only nontrivial solution pair to the cannonball problem, along with 70. It is also the kissing number in 4-dimensional space. This fact can be used in the construction of the 24-dimensional Leech lattice. An icositetragon is a regular polygon with 24 sides. A tesseract has 24 two-dimensional square faces.

The 24-cell, consisting of 24 octahedra and having 24 vertices, is a special polytope that only exists in four dimensions. The vertices of the 24-cell are the root vectors of the $D_4$ root system:
$$\{\pm e_i \pm e_j : 1\leq i<j\leq 4\}$$
in four-dimensional Euclidean space. In quaternionic form, the same configuration may be identified with the 24 unit Hurwitz quaternions, which form the binary tetrahedral group.

The optimal sphere packing problem has been solved in dimension 24, one of the only dimensions where this has been solved (the others being dimensions 1–3, and 8).

The number 24 appears prominently in the theory of modular forms through the Dedekind eta function
$$\eta(\tau)=q^{1/24}\prod_{n>0}(1-q^n),\qquad q=e^{2\pi i\tau}.$$
The eta function has weight $1/2$ and transforms with a multiplier system of order 24. Its 24th power is the modular discriminant
$$\Delta(\tau)=\eta(\tau)^{24}=q\prod_{n>0}(1-q^n)^{24},$$
a cusp form of weight 12 for $\mathrm{SL}_2(\mathbb Z)$.

The number 24 also occurs in coding theory and finite group theory through the extended binary Golay code, a self-dual binary linear code with parameters $[24,12,8]$. The supports of its codewords of weight 8, called octads, form the Steiner system $S(5,8,24)$, also known as the Witt design. The automorphism group of the extended binary Golay code, equivalently of this Steiner system, is the Mathieu group $M_{24}$, one of the sporadic simple groups. The extended Golay code and the Witt design are also used in standard constructions of the Leech lattice.

== In religion ==
- In Christian apocalyptic literature it represents the complete Church, being the sum of the 12 tribes of Israel and the 12 Apostles of the Lamb of God. For example, in The Book of Revelation: "Surrounding the throne were twenty-four other thrones, and seated on them were twenty-four elders. They were dressed in white and had crowns of gold on their heads."
- Number of Tirthankaras in Jainism.
- Number of spokes in the Ashoka Chakra.

== In culture ==
- In Brazil, twenty-four is associated with homosexuality as it is the number that stands for the deer in a game known as “jogo do bicho”.
- There are 24 hours in a day.
