= 25 (number) =

← 24	25	26 →
- ← 20 21 22 23 24 25 26 27 28 29 →: List of numbers; Integers; ← 0 10 20 30 40 50 60 70 80 90 →
- Cardinal: twenty-five
- Ordinal: 25th (twenty-fifth)
- Factorization: 5^{2}
- Divisors: 1, 5, 25
- Greek numeral: ΚΕ´
- Roman numeral: XXV, xxv
- Binary: 11001_{2}
- Ternary: 221_{3}
- Senary: 41_{6}
- Octal: 31_{8}
- Duodecimal: 21_{12}
- Hexadecimal: 19_{16}

25 (twenty-five) is the natural number following 24 and preceding 26.

== In mathematics ==
25 is a square.

It is a square number, being 5^{2}. 25 is also the smallest square that is also a sum of two nonzero squares: $25 = 3^2 + 4^2$. In other words, the numbers 3, 4 and 5 form the smallest Pythagorean triple. It is also commonly remembered as 1/4 of 100.

== In religion ==
In Ezekiel's vision of a new temple: The number twenty-five is of cardinal importance in Ezekiel's Temple Vision (in the Bible, Ezekiel chapters 40–48).

== In sports ==
In baseball, the number 25 is typically reserved for the best slugger on the team. Examples include Mark McGwire, Barry Bonds, Jim Thome, and Mark Teixeira.

== In other fields ==
Twenty-five years of marriage is marked in a silver wedding anniversary.
