= 26 (number) =

← 25	26	27 →
- ← 20 21 22 23 24 25 26 27 28 29 →: List of numbers; Integers; ← 0 10 20 30 40 50 60 70 80 90 →
- Cardinal: twenty-six
- Ordinal: 26th (twenty-sixth)
- Factorization: 2 × 13
- Divisors: 1, 2, 13, 26
- Greek numeral: ΚϚ´
- Roman numeral: XXVI, xxvi
- Binary: 11010_{2}
- Ternary: 222_{3}
- Senary: 42_{6}
- Octal: 32_{8}
- Duodecimal: 22_{12}
- Hexadecimal: 1A_{16}

26 (twenty-six) is the natural number following 25 and preceding 27.

== In mathematics ==
26 is a composite number. 26 is also a telephone number, specifically, the number of ways of connecting 5 points with pairwise connections.

=== Group theory ===
There are 26 sporadic groups.

The 26-dimensional Lorentzian unimodular lattice II_{25,1} plays a significant role in sphere packing problems and the classification of finite simple groups.

== In religion ==
- 26 is the gematric number, being the sum of the Hebrew characters (Hebrew: יהוה) being the name of the god of Israel – YHWH (Yahweh). 26 is also the gematric number for GOD with the corresponding substitutions in English (i.e. A=1, B=2, C=3, and so on)
- In the Tenrikyo religion of Japan, 26 is frequently used, since it marks the lunar calendar date of its founder Nakayama Miki's first divine revelation and also her death.
