= 22 (number) =

← 21	22	23 →
- ← 20 21 22 23 24 25 26 27 28 29 →: List of numbers; Integers; ← 0 10 20 30 40 50 60 70 80 90 →
- Cardinal: twenty-two
- Ordinal: 22nd (twenty-second)
- Numeral system: Duovigesimal
- Factorization: 2 × 11
- Divisors: 1, 2, 11, 22
- Greek numeral: ΚΒ´
- Roman numeral: XXII, xxii
- Binary: 10110_{2}
- Ternary: 211_{3}
- Senary: 34_{6}
- Octal: 26_{8}
- Duodecimal: 1A_{12}
- Hexadecimal: 16_{16}

22 (twenty-two) is the natural number following 21 and preceding 23.

== In mathematics ==
22 is a semiprime, a Smith number, and an Erdős–Woods number. $\frac{22}{7} = 3.14{\color{red}28}\ldots$ is a commonly used approximation of the irrational number π, the ratio of the circumference of a circle to its diameter.

22 can read as "two twos", which is the only fixed point of John Conway's look-and-say function.

The number 22 appears prominently within sporadic groups. The Mathieu group M_{22} is one of 26 sporadic finite simple groups, defined as the 3-transitive permutation representation on 22 points. There are also 22 regular complex apeirohedra.

== In culture and religion ==
- 22 is a master number in numerology.
- There are 22 cards in the Major Arcana suit of a traditional tarot card deck, though they are often numbered 0-21.

== In other fields ==
- There are 22 genetically encoded amino acids throughout known life that generate proteins during RNA translation.
- There are 22 of yards in a chain.
- Catch-22 (1961), Joseph Heller's novel, and its 1970 film adaptation gave rise to the expression of logic "catch-22".
- 22 equal temperament is a popular microtonal tuning temperament due to its good approximation of harmonic intervals, especially septimal intervals.
- In French jargon, "22" is used as a phrase to warn of the coming of the police (typically "22, v'là les flics !", in English: "5-0! Cops!")
- In Spanish lottery and bingo, 22 is nicknamed los dos patitos, 'the two little ducks' after its shape.

== See also ==
- Catch 22 (disambiguation)
