= 23 (number) =

← 22	23	24 →
- ← 20 21 22 23 24 25 26 27 28 29 →: List of numbers; Integers; ← 0 10 20 30 40 50 60 70 80 90 →
- Cardinal: twenty-three
- Ordinal: 23rd (twenty-third)
- Numeral system: trivigesimal
- Factorization: prime
- Prime: 9th
- Divisors: 1, 23
- Greek numeral: ΚΓ´
- Roman numeral: XXIII, xxiii
- Binary: 10111_{2}
- Ternary: 212_{3}
- Senary: 35_{6}
- Octal: 27_{8}
- Duodecimal: 1B_{12}
- Hexadecimal: 17_{16}

23 (twenty-three) is the natural number following 22 and preceding 24. It is a prime number.

== In mathematics ==
=== Prime number properties ===
Twenty-three is the ninth prime number and the smallest odd prime that is not a twin prime. It forms a cousin prime pair with 19 and a sexy prime pair with both 17 and 29. It is the largest member of the first prime sextuplet (7, 11, 13, 17, 19, 23). Twenty-three is also the next to last member of the first Cunningham chain of the first kind (2, 5, 11, 23, 47). It is the sum of the prime factors of the second set of consecutive discrete semiprimes, (21, 22). 23 is the smallest odd prime to be a highly cototient number, as the solution to $x-\phi(x)$ for the integers 95, 119, 143, and 529.

23 is the second Smarandache–Wellin prime in base ten, as it is the concatenation of the decimal representations of the first two primes (2 and 3) and is itself also prime, It is the fifth factorial prime, and since 14! + 1 is a multiple of 23, but 23 is not one more than a multiple of 14, 23 is the first Pillai prime. 23 is the second Woodall prime, and an Eisenstein prime with no imaginary part and real part of the form $3n-1.$ It is the fifth Sophie Germain prime and the fourth safe prime.

23 is the first prime p for which unique factorization of cyclotomic integers based on the pth root of unity breaks down. 23 is the smallest prime $p$ such that the largest consecutive pair of $p$-smooth numbers (11859210, 11859211) is the same as the largest consecutive pair of $(p-1)$-smooth numbers.

The sum of the first nine primes up to 23 is a square: $2 + 3 + \dots + 23 = 100 = 10^{2}$ and the sum of the first 23 primes is 874, which is divisible by 23, a property shared by few other numbers.

The first twenty-three odd prime numbers (between 3 and 89 inclusive), are all cluster primes $p$ such that every even positive integer $k \le p - 3$ can be written as the sum of two prime numbers that do not exceed $p$.

The twenty-third permutable prime in decimal $R_{19}$ is also the second to be a prime repunit (after $R_{2}$), followed by $R_{23}$ and $R_{1031}$.

In the list of fortunate numbers, 23 occurs twice, since adding 23 to either the fifth or eighth primorial gives a prime number (namely 2333 and 9699713).

=== Other mathematical properties ===
The twenty-third highly composite number 20,160 is one less than the last number (the 339th super-prime 20,161) that cannot be expressed as the sum of two abundant numbers. Otherwise, $46 = 23 \times 2$ is the largest even number that is not the sum of two abundant numbers.

23 has the distinction of being one of two integers that cannot be expressed as the sum of fewer than 9 cubes of positive integers (the other is 239). See Waring's problem.

There are 23 trees on 8 unlabeled nodes. It is also a Wedderburn–Etherington number, which are numbers that can be used to count certain binary trees.

The natural logarithms of all positive integers lower than 23 are known to have binary BBP-type formulae.

23 is a happy number.

23 is the smallest positive solution to Sunzi's original formulation of the Chinese remainder theorem.

According to the birthday paradox, in a group of 23 or more randomly chosen people, the probability is more than 50% that some pair of them will have the same birthday.

A related coincidence is that 365 times the natural logarithm of 2, approximately 252.999, is very close to the number of pairs of 23 items and 22nd triangular number, 253.

23 is the smallest discriminant of imaginary quadratic fields with class number 3 (negated), and it is the smallest discriminant of complex cubic fields (also negated).

Hilbert's problems are twenty-three problems in mathematics published by German mathematician David Hilbert in 1900.

=== Mersenne numbers ===
The first Mersenne number of the form $2^{n} - 1$ that does not yield a prime number when inputting a prime exponent is $2047 = 23 \times 89,$ with $n=11.$

On the other hand, the second composite Mersenne number contains an exponent $n$ of twenty-three:
$$M_{23} = 2^{23} - 1 = 8\;388\;607 = 47 \times 178\;481$$

The twenty-third prime number (83) is an exponent to the fourteenth composite Mersenne number, which factorizes into two prime numbers, the largest of which is twenty-three digits long when written in base ten:
$$M_{83} = 967...407 = 167 \times 57\;912\;614\;113\;275\;649\;087\;721$$

Further down in this sequence, the seventeenth and eighteenth composite Mersenne numbers have two prime factors each as well, where the largest of these are respectively twenty-two and twenty-four digits long,
$$\begin{align}
M_{103} & = 101 \ldots 007 = 2\;550\;183\;799 \times 3\;976\;656\;429\;941\;438\;590\;393 \\
M_{109} & = 649 \ldots 511 = 745\;988\;807 \times 870\;035\;986\;098\;720\;987\;332\;873 \\
\end{align}$$

Where prime exponents for $M_{23}$ and $M_{83}$ add to 106, which lies in between prime exponents of $M_{103}$ and $M_{109}$, the index of the latter two (17 and 18) in the sequence of Mersenne numbers sum to 35, which is the twenty-third composite number.

$23!$ is twenty-three digits long in decimal, and there are only three other numbers $n$ whose factorials generate numbers that are $n$ digits long in base ten: 1, 22, and 24.

=== In geometry ===
The Leech lattice Λ_{24} is a 24-dimensional lattice through which 23 other positive definite even unimodular Niemeier lattices of rank 24 are built, and vice-versa. Λ_{24} represents the solution to the kissing number in 24 dimensions as the precise lattice structure for the maximum number of spheres that can fill 24-dimensional space without overlapping, equal to 196,560 spheres. These 23 Niemeier lattices are located at deep holes of radii √2 in lattice points around its automorphism group, Conway group $\mathbb C_{0}$. The Leech lattice can be constructed in various ways, which include:

- By means of a matrix of the form
  $$\scriptstyle\begin{pmatrix} Ia&H/2\\H/2&Ib\end{pmatrix}$$
  where $I$ is the identity matrix and $H$ is a 24 by 24 Hadamard matrix (Z/23Z ∪ ∞) with a = 2 and b = 3, and entries X(∞) = 1 and X(0) = -1 with X(n) the quadratic residue symbol mod 23 for nonzero n.
- Through the extended binary Golay code $\mathbb B_{24}$ and Witt design $\mathbb W_{24}$, which produce a construction of the 196,560 minimal vectors in the Leech lattice. The extended binary Golay code is an extension of the perfect binary Golay code $\mathbb B_{23}$, which has codewords of size 23. $\mathbb B_{23}$ has Mathieu group $\mathbb M_{23}$ as its automorphism group, which is the second largest member of the first generation in the happy family of sporadic groups. $\mathbb M_{23}$ has a minimum faithful complex representation in 22 dimensions and group-3 actions on 253 objects, with 253 equal to the number of pairs of objects in a set of 23 objects. In turn, $\mathbb M_{23}$ is the automorphism group of Mathieu group $\mathbb M_{24}$, which works through $\mathbb W_{24}$ to generate 8-element octads whose individual elements occur 253 times through its entire block design.
- Using Niemer lattice D_{24} of group order 2^{23}·24! and Coxeter number 46 = 2·23, it can be made into a module over the ring of integers of quadratic field $\mathbb{Q}(\sqrt{-23})$, whereby multiplying D_{24} by a non-principal ideal of the ring of integers yields the Leech lattice.

Conway and Sloane provided constructions of the Leech lattice from all other 23 Niemeier lattices.

Twenty-three four-dimensional crystal families exist within the classification of space groups. These are accompanied by six enantiomorphic forms, maximizing the total count to twenty-nine crystal families. Five cubes can be arranged to form twenty-three free pentacubes, or twenty-nine distinct one-sided pentacubes (with reflections).

There are 23 three-dimensional uniform polyhedra that are cell facets inside uniform 4-polytopes that are not part of infinite families of antiprismatic prisms and duoprisms: the five Platonic solids, the thirteen Archimedean solids, and five semiregular prisms (the triangular, pentagonal, hexagonal, octagonal, and decagonal prisms).

23 Coxeter groups of paracompact hyperbolic honeycombs in the third dimension generate 151 unique Wythoffian constructions of paracompact honeycombs. 23 four-dimensional Euclidean honeycombs are generated from the ${\tilde{B}}_4$ cubic group, and 23 five-dimensional uniform polytopes are generated from the $\mathrm D_{5}$ demihypercubic group.

In two-dimensional geometry, the regular 23-sided icositrigon is the first regular polygon that is not constructible with a compass and straight edge or with the aide of an angle trisector (since it is neither a Fermat prime nor a Pierpont prime), nor by neusis or a double-notched straight edge. It is also not constructible with origami, however it is through other traditional methods for all regular polygons.

== In religion ==
- In Biblical numerology, it is associated with Psalm 23, also known as the Shepherd Psalm. It is possibly the most quoted and best known Psalm.
- Principia Discordia, the sacred text of Discordianism, holds that 23 (along with the discordian prime 5) is one of the sacred numbers of Eris, goddess of discord.

== In sport ==
The squad number 23 became a popular choice from the 1990s onward due to association with superstar basketball player Michael Jordan. Jordan, widely regarded as the best basketball player of all time picked 23 early in his life as a tribute to his brother Larry. Larry wore 45, and Jordan chose 23 by dividing 45 in half to produce 22.5, then rounded up to 23. Jordan wore 23 at the University of North Carolina and then in the National Basketball Association for the Chicago Bulls. The association of 23 with superstardom increased with the use of 23 by LeBron James, who chose 23 because of Jordan, was a star in college and then become the NBA's all-time leading scorer, a multi-time championship winner, regular season MVP, Finals MPV and All Star player. Other highly successful players to wear 23 include Draymond Green, Anthony Davis and Jimmy Butler.

In cricket, 23 was chosen by Shane Warne during his early career as a junior AFL player for St Kilda because his childhood sporting hero, AFL player Dermott Brereton wore 23. Warne chose to play cricket full time and became the best spin bowler in the history of the sport. Warne's success in the sport gave 23 a similar association to that in Basketball. Warne passed the number onto future Australian cricket team captain Michael Clarke in 2004. Indian player Kuldeep Yadav chose 23 due to Warne using it.

David Beckham, global football superstar chose 23 after joining Real Madrid in 2003 when he refused to ask for his normal 7 number. 7 is a traditional number for Beckham's right wing position but at Madrid it was already taken by Raul. Victoria Beckham, his wife, told him to take 23 because "the number 23 didn’t do Jordan any harm". Wesley Sneijder, Rafael van der Vaart, Isco, Mesut Özil and Christian Eriksen all wore 23 during their career. Outside of the association to Beckham and Jordan, 23 is often the number given to the third choice goalkeeper as the earlier numbers are enough to provide two sets of the 11 players a team is made up of.

NFL uniform numbers have been subject to various levels of standardisation. 20 and 40 series numbers were used by half backs in the 1952 rulebook, in 1973 this was expanded so all types of running backs or defensive backs could wear from 20 to 49. The system was simplified in 2021 so that anyone except a quarterback or offensive lineman could wear 23. Devin Hester, a NFL Hall of Fame kick return specialist and multi time pro-bowl player began his career as a defensive back, choosing 23. It has been a historically popular number for cornerback defensive players. Troy Vincent wore 23 during his 5 time pro bowl career as a defensive back.

== In popular culture ==
=== Film and television ===
- In the TV series Lost, 23 is one of the 6 reoccurring numbers (4, 8, 15, 16, 23, 42) that appear frequently throughout the show.

=== Other fields ===
- 23 skidoo (phrase) (sometimes 23 skiddoo) is an American slang phrase popularized during the early 20th century. 23 skidoo has been described as "perhaps the first truly national fad expression and one of the most popular fad expressions to appear in the U.S".
- The 23 enigma, proposed by William S. Burroughs, plays a prominent role in the plot of the Illuminatus! Trilogy by Robert Shea and Robert Anton Wilson.
  - The Number 23 is a 2007 film starring Jim Carrey about a man who becomes obsessed with the 23 enigma.
  - The number 23 is used a lot throughout the visuals and music by the band Gorillaz, who have even devoted a whole page of their autobiography Rise Of The Ogre to the 23 enigma theory.
- Human cells have 23 pairs of chromosomes (22 pairs of autosomes and one pair of sex chromosomes).
