= 20 (number) =

← 19	20	21 →
- ← 20 21 22 23 24 25 26 27 28 29 →: List of numbers; Integers; ← 0 10 20 30 40 50 60 70 80 90 →
- Cardinal: twenty
- Ordinal: 20th (twentieth)
- Numeral system: vigesimal
- Factorization: 2^{2} × 5
- Divisors: 1, 2, 4, 5, 10, 20
- Greek numeral: Κ´
- Roman numeral: XX, xx
- Binary: 10100_{2}
- Ternary: 202_{3}
- Senary: 32_{6}
- Octal: 24_{8}
- Duodecimal: 18_{12}
- Hexadecimal: 14_{16}
- Armenian: Ի
- Hebrew: כ / ך
- Babylonian numeral: ⟪
- Egyptian hieroglyph: 𓎏

20 (twenty) is the natural number following 19 and preceding 21. A group of twenty units is sometimes referred to as a score.

== In mathematics ==
Twenty is a composite number. It is also the smallest primitive abundant number because all of its proper divisors are deficient.

The Happy Family of sporadic groups is made up of twenty finite simple groups that are all subquotients of the friendly giant, the largest of twenty-six sporadic groups.

=== Geometry ===
An icosagon is a polygon with 20 edges. Bring's curve is a Riemann surface, whose fundamental polygon is a regular hyperbolic icosagon.

==== Platonic solids ====
An icosahedron has twenty triangular faces.

The largest number of faces a Platonic solid can have is twenty faces, which make up a regular icosahedron. A dodecahedron, on the other hand, has twenty vertices, likewise the most a regular polyhedron can have. This is because the icosahedron and dodecahedron are duals of each other.

== Other fields ==
=== Science ===
==== Physics ====
20 is the third magic number in physics.

==== Biology ====
In some countries, the number 20 is used as an index in measuring visual acuity. 20/20 indicates normal vision at 20 feet (6.1 m), although it is commonly used to mean "perfect vision" in countries using the Imperial system. (The metric equivalent is 6/6.) When someone is able to see only after an event how things turned out, that person is often said to have had "20/20 hindsight".

==== Psychology ====
In many disciplines of developmental psychology, adulthood starts at age 20.

=== Culture ===
==== Age 20 ====
The traditional age of majority in Japan, although the voting age has been reduced to 18. Japanese people commemorate the twentieth birthday with personal ceremonies, and it comes with a number of legal rights like the right to marry. To represent this, the Japanese language has a special word for "20-years-old" that does not follow the rest of their numbering system. Accordingly, the word 二十歳 is read all at once as "はたち" (hatachi) rather than the expected pronunciation of the three characters as "にじゅうさい" (nijyuusai, which is literally "two," "ten," and the counter for "years old").

==== Number systems ====
20 is the basis for vigesimal number systems, used by several different civilizations in the past (and to this day), including the Maya.

== Indefinite number ==
A 'score' is a group of twenty (often used in combination with a cardinal number, e.g. fourscore to mean 80), but also often used as a large, indefinite number (e.g. the newspaper headline "Scores of Typhoon Survivors Flown to Manila").
