= 19 (number) =

← 18	19	20 →
- ← 10 11 12 13 14 15 16 17 18 19 →: List of numbers; Integers; ← 0 10 20 30 40 50 60 70 80 90 →
- Cardinal: nineteen
- Ordinal: 19th (nineteenth)
- Numeral system: nonadecimal
- Factorization: prime
- Prime: 8th
- Divisors: 1, 19
- Greek numeral: ΙΘ´
- Roman numeral: XIX, xix
- Binary: 10011_{2}
- Ternary: 201_{3}
- Senary: 31_{6}
- Octal: 23_{8}
- Duodecimal: 17_{12}
- Hexadecimal: 13_{16}
- Hebrew numeral: י"ט
- Babylonian numeral: 𒌋𒐝

19 (nineteen) is the natural number following 18 and preceding 20. It is a prime number.

== Mathematics ==
19 is a centered triangular number.

19 is the eighth prime number. 19 forms a twin prime pair with 17, a cousin prime pair with 23, and a sexy prime pair with 13. 19 is a strictly non-palindromic number in any base, 19 is the maximum number of fourth powers needed to sum up to any natural number (see, Waring's problem). There are 19 compositions of 8 into distinct parts.

There are 19 nodes in regular hexagon with all diagonals drawn is nineteen. The only nontrivial normal magic hexagon is composed of nineteen cells, where every diagonal of consecutive hexagons has sums equal to 38, or twice 19. A hexaflexagon is a strip of nineteen alternating triangular faces that can flex into a regular hexagon, such that any two of six colorings on triangles can be oriented to align on opposite sides of the folded figure.

$\tfrac {1} {19}$ can be used to generate the first full, non-normal prime reciprocal magic square in decimal whose rows, columns and diagonals — in a 18 x 18 array — all generate a magic constant of 81 = 9^{2}.

=== Abstract Algebra ===
19 is a supersingular prime, a member in the sequence of fifteen such primes that divide the order of the Friendly Giant $\mathrm {F_{1}}$. Additionally, 19 also divides the orders of the Janko groups $\mathrm {J_{1}}$ and $\mathrm {J_{3}}$.

19 is a Heegner number.

== Science ==
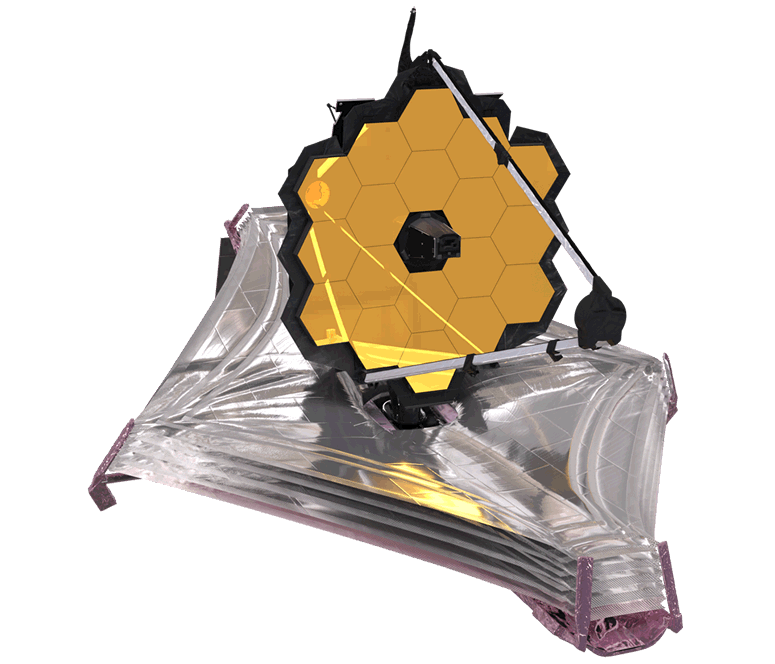
The James Webb Space Telescope features a design of 19 hexagons.

- The James Webb Space Telescope's optical elements are in an array of 19 hexagons, wherein 18 segmented primary mirrors focus light into a centered secondary mirror situated above the collecting mirrors, that in-turn reflects back onto the telescope's central imagers. It is a shape akin to the order-3 magic hexagon.
- The Metonic cycle is almost exactly 19 years long.

== Music ==
- Nineteen has been used as an alternative to twelve for a division of the octave into equal parts. This idea goes back to Salinas in the sixteenth century, and is interesting in part because it gives a system of meantone tuning, being close to 1/3 comma meantone. See 19 equal temperament.
- Some organs use the 19th harmonic to approximate a minor third.

== Religion ==
=== Islam ===
- The number of angels guarding Hell ("Hellfire") ("Saqar") according to the Qur'an: "Over it are nineteen" (74:30), after which the Qur'an describes this number as being "a trial for those who disbelieve" (74:31), a sign for people of the scripture to be "convinced" (74:31) and that believers "will increase in faith" (74:31) due to it.
- The Number of Verse and Sura together in the Qur'an which announces Jesus son of Maryam's (Mary's) birth (Qur'an 19:19).

=== Baháʼí Faith ===
In the Bábí and Baháʼí Faiths, a group of 19 is called a Váhid, a Unity (Arabic: واحد, romanized: wāhid, lit. 'one'). The numerical value of this word in the Abjad numeral system is 19.

- The Baháʼí calendar is structured such that a year contains 19 months of 19 days each (along with the intercalary period of Ayyám-i-Há), as well as a 19-year cycle and a 361-year (19x19) supercycle.
- The Báb and his disciples formed a group of 19.
- There were 19 Apostles of Bahá'u'lláh.

=== Celtic paganism ===
19 is a sacred number of the goddess Brigid because it is said to represent the 19-year cycle of the Great Celtic Year and the amount of time it takes the Moon to coincide with the winter solstice.

== Literature ==
Stephen King's eight-book epic The Dark Tower saga employs the number 19 in books The Dark Tower: The Gunslinger, The Dark Tower V: Wolves of the Calla, The Dark Tower VI: Song of Susannah, The Dark Tower VII: The Dark Tower, and The Wind Through the Keyhole as a mysterious and important number. They refer to the "ka-tet of 19", "Directive Nineteen," many names add up to 19, 19 seems to permeate every aspect of Roland and his traveler's lives. In addition, the number ends up being a powerful key.

== Games ==
Though the maximum score for a cribbage hand is 29, there is no combination of cards that adds up to 19 points. Many cribbage players, therefore, jokingly refer to a zero-point hand as "a 19 hand".

== In sports ==
In golf, the '19th hole' is the clubhouse bar and in match play, if there is a tie after 18 holes, an extra hole(s) is played. In miniature golf, it is an extra hole on which the winner earns an instant prize.

== Age 19 ==
- In four countries (Algeria, South Korea, United States (Alabama and Nebraska), and Canada), 19 is the age of majority.
- In two countries (South Korea and Canada), 19 is the minimum legal drinking age.
- In three countries (Algeria, South Korea, and Canada), 19 is the minimum legal smoking age.
- The minimum age for the NBA draft is 19 years old.
