= Størmer number =

Number n where the highest prime factor of (n^2 + 1) is at least 2n

In mathematics, a Størmer number, or arc-cotangent irreducible number, is a positive integer $n$ for which the greatest prime factor of $n^2+1$ is greater than or equal to $2n$. They are named after Carl Størmer.

The first Størmer numbers below 100 are:

1, 2, 4, 5, 6, 9, 10, 11, 12, 14, 15, 16, 19, 20, 22, 23, 24, 25, 26, 27, 28, 29, 33, 34, 35, 36, 37, 39, 40, 42, 44, 45, 48, 49, 51, 52, 53, 54, 56, 58, 59, 60, 61, 62, 63, 64, 65, 66, 67, 69, 71, 74, 77, 78, 79, 80, 81, 82, 84, 85, 86, 87, 88, 89, 90, 92, 94, 95, 96, 97...

(sequence A005528 in the OEIS). The complementary sequence (numbers below 100 that aren't Størmer numbers) is only

3, 7, 8, 13, 17, 18, 21, 30, 31, 32, 38, 41, 43, 46, 47, 50, 55, 57, 68, 70, 72, 73, 75, 76, 83, 91, 93, 98, 99, 100.

== Density ==
John Todd proved that this sequence is neither finite nor cofinite.

Unsolved problem in mathematics
What is the natural density of the Størmer numbers?
More unsolved problems in mathematics

More precisely, the natural density of the Størmer numbers lies between 0.5324 and 0.905. It has been conjectured that their natural density is the natural logarithm of 2, approximately 0.693, but this remains unproven. Because the Størmer numbers have positive density, the Størmer numbers form a large set.

== Applications ==
The Størmer numbers arise in connection with the problem of representing the Gregory numbers (arctangents of rational numbers) $G_{a/b}=\arctan(b/a)$ as sums of Gregory numbers for integers (arctangents of unit fractions). The Gregory number $G_{a/b}$ may be decomposed by repeatedly multiplying the Gaussian integer $a+bi$ by numbers of the form $n\pm i$, in order to cancel prime factors $p$ from the imaginary part; here $n$ is chosen to be a Størmer number such that $n^2+1$ is divisible by $p$.
