= 3 =

Natural number

← 2	3	4 →
- −1 0 1 2 3 4 5 6 7 8 9 →: List of numbers; Integers; ← 0 10 20 30 40 50 60 70 80 90 →
- Cardinal: three
- Ordinal: 3rd (third)
- Numeral system: ternary
- Factorization: prime
- Prime: 2nd
- Divisors: 1, 3
- Greek numeral: Γ´
- Roman numeral: III or iii
- Latin prefix: tre-/ter-
- Binary: 11_{2}
- Ternary: 10_{3}
- Senary: 3_{6}
- Octal: 3_{8}
- Duodecimal: 3_{12}
- Hexadecimal: 3_{16}
- Arabic, Kurdish, Persian, Sindhi, Urdu: ٣
- Bengali, Assamese: ৩
- Chinese: 三，弎，叄
- Devanāgarī: ३
- Santali: ᱓
- Ge'ez: ፫
- Greek: γ (or Γ)
- Hebrew: ג
- Japanese: 三/参
- Khmer: ៣
- Armenian: Գ
- Malayalam: ൩
- Tamil: ௩
- Telugu: ౩
- Kannada: ೩
- Thai: ๓
- N'Ko: ߃
- Lao: ໓
- Georgian: Ⴂ/ⴂ/გ (Gani)
- Babylonian numeral: 𒐗
- Maya numerals: •••
- Morse code: ... _ _

3 (three) is a number, numeral and digit. It is the natural number following 2 and preceding 4, and is the smallest odd prime number and the only prime preceding a square number.

It has religious and cultural significance in many societies.

== Evolution of the Arabic digit ==

The use of three lines to denote the number 3 occurred in many writing systems, including some (like Roman and Chinese numerals) that are still in use. That was also the original representation of 3 in the Brahmic (Indian) numerical notation, its earliest forms aligned vertically. However, during the Gupta Empire, the sign was modified by the addition of a curve on each line. The Nāgarī script rotated the lines clockwise, so they appeared horizontally, and ended each line with a short downward stroke on the right. In cursive script, the three strokes were eventually connected to form a symbol resembling a ⟨3⟩ with an additional stroke at the bottom: ३.

The Indian digits spread to the Caliphate in the 9th century. The bottom stroke was dropped around the 10th century in the western parts of the Caliphate, such as the Maghreb and Al-Andalus, when a distinct variant ("Western Arabic") of the digit symbols developed, including modern Western 3. In contrast, the Eastern Arabs retained and enlarged that stroke, rotating the digit once more to yield the modern ("Eastern") Arabic digit "٣".

In most modern Western typefaces, the digit 3, like the other decimal digits, has the height of a capital letter, and sits on the baseline. In typefaces with text figures, on the other hand, the glyph usually has the height of a lowercase letter "x" and a descender: " ". In some French text-figure typefaces, though, it has an ascender instead of a descender.

A common graphic variant of the digit three has a flat top, similar to the letter Ʒ (ezh). This form, sometimes called a banker's 3, can stop a forger from turning the 3 into an 8. It is found on UPC-A barcodes and standard 52-card decks.

== Mathematics ==
=== Divisibility rule ===
A natural number is divisible by 3 if the sum of its digits in base 10 is also divisible by 3. This known as the divisibility rule of 3. Because of this, the reverse of any number that is divisible by three (or indeed, any permutation of its digits) is also divisible by three. This divisibility rule works in any positional numeral system whose base divided by three leaves a remainder of one (bases 4, 7, 10, etc.).

=== Properties ===
3 is the second smallest prime number and the first odd prime number. It is a twin prime with 5, and a cousin prime with 7.

A triangle is made of three sides. It is the smallest non-self-intersecting polygon and the only polygon not to have proper diagonals. When doing quick estimates, 3 is a rough approximation of π, 3.1415..., and a very rough approximation of e, 2.71828...

3 is the first Mersenne prime. It is also the first of five known Fermat primes. It is the second Fibonacci prime (and the second Lucas prime), the second Sophie Germain prime, and the second factorial prime.

3 is the second and only prime triangular number, and Carl Friedrich Gauss proved that every integer is the sum of at most three triangular numbers.

Three is the only prime which is one less than a perfect square. Any other number which is $n^2$ − 1 for some integer $n$ is not prime, since it is ($n$ − 1)($n$ + 1). This is true for 3 as well (with $n$ = 2), but in this case the smaller factor is 1. If $n$ is greater than 2, both $n$ − 1 and $n$ + 1 are greater than 1 so their product is not prime.

The integers modulo 3 form the finite field $\mathbb F_3$, the smallest finite field of odd characteristic. In algebraic geometry, characteristic 3 is one of the small characteristics in which standard formulas may require separate treatment; for example, elliptic curves in characteristics 2 and 3 do not always admit short Weierstrass equations of the form $y^2=x^3+Ax+B$.

=== Numeral systems ===
There is some evidence to suggest that early man may have used counting systems which consisted of "One, Two, Three" and thereafter "Many" to describe counting limits. Early peoples had a word to describe the quantities of one, two, and three, but any quantity beyond was simply denoted as "Many". This is most likely based on the prevalence of this phenomenon among people in such disparate regions as the deep Amazon and Borneo jungles, where Western civilization's explorers have historical records of their first encounters with these indigenous people.

=== Geometry ===
Three non-collinear points determine a unique plane in a three dimensional affine space, and a unique circle in a Euclidean plane.

An object has rotational symmetry of order 3 if it is unchanged by a rotation of one third of a full turn, or 120 degrees.

=== List of basic calculations ===
Multiplication	1	2	3	4	5	6	7	8	9	10	11	12	13	14	15	16	17	18	19	20	21	22	23	24	25	50	100	1000	10000
3 × x	3	6	9	12	15	18	21	24	27	30	33	36	39	42	45	48	51	54	57	60	63	66	69	72	75	150	300	3000	30000

Division	1	2	3	4	5	6	7	8	9	10	11	12	13	14	15	16	17	18	19	20
3 ÷ x	3	1.5	1	0.75	0.6	0.5	0.4̅2̅8̅5̅7̅1̅	0.375	0.3̅	0.3	0.2̅7̅	0.25	0.2̅3̅0̅7̅6̅9̅	0.21̅4̅2̅8̅5̅7̅	0.2	0.1875	0.17̅6̅4̅7̅0̅5̅8̅8̅2̅3̅5̅2̅9̅4̅1̅1̅	0.16̅	0.15̅7̅8̅9̅4̅7̅3̅6̅8̅4̅2̅1̅0̅5̅2̅6̅3̅	0.15
x ÷ 3	0.3̅	0.6̅	1	1.3̅	1.6̅	2	2.3̅	2.6̅	3	3.3̅	3.6̅	4	4.3̅	4.6̅	5	5.3̅	5.6̅	6	6.3̅	6.6̅

Exponentiation	1	2	3	4	5	6	7	8	9	10	11	12	13	14	15	16	17	18	19	20
3^{x}	3	9	27	81	243	729	2187	6561	19683	59049	177147	531441	1594323	4782969	14348907	43046721	129140163	387420489	1162261467	3486784401
x^{3}	1	8	27	64	125	216	343	512	729	1000	1331	1728	2197	2744	3375	4096	4913	5832	6859	8000

== Engineering ==
The triangle, a polygon with three edges and three vertices, is the most stable physical shape. For this reason it is widely utilized in construction, engineering and design.

=== Mystical ===
Three is the symbolic representation for Mu, Augustus Le Plongeon's and James Churchward's lost continent.

== Religion and beliefs ==
Symbol of the Triple Goddess showing the waxing, full and waning Moon

Many world religions contain triple deities or concepts of trinity, including the Hindu Trimurti and Tridevi, the Triglav (lit. 'Three-headed one'), the chief god of the Slavs, the three Jewels of Buddhism, the three Pure Ones of Taoism, the Christian Trinity, the Greek goddess Hecate and the Triple Goddess of Wicca.

Pythagoras and the Pythagorean school highlighted that the number 3, which they called triad, is the only number to equal the sum of all the terms below it, and the only number whose sum with those below equals the product of them and itself.

The Shield of the Trinity is a diagram of the Christian doctrine of the Trinity.

=== As a lucky or unlucky number ===
Three (三, formal writing: 叁, pinyin sān, Cantonese: saam^{1}) is considered a good number in Chinese culture because when pronounced, it sounds like the word "alive" (生 pinyin shēng, Cantonese: saang^{1}), compared to four (四, pinyin: sì, Cantonese: sei^{1}), which sounds like the word "death" (死 pinyin sǐ, Cantonese: sei^{2}).

The phrase "Third time's the charm" refers to the superstition that after two failures in any endeavor, a third attempt is more likely to succeed. However, some superstitions say the opposite, stating that luck, especially bad luck, is often said to "come in threes".

One such superstition, called "Three on a Match", says that it is unlucky to be the third person to light a cigarette from the same match or lighter. This superstition is sometimes asserted to have originated among soldiers in the trenches of the First World War when a sniper might see the first light, take aim on the second and fire on the third.

== See also ==
- Cube (algebra) – (3 superscript)
- Thrice
- Third
- Triad
- Trio
- Rule of three
- ɜ, U+025C ɜ LATIN SMALL LETTER REVERSED OPEN E also known as Reversed epsilon
