= 720 (number) =

| ← 719 | 720 | 721 → |
- List of numbers; Integers; ← 0 100 200 300 400 500 600 700 800 900 →
- Cardinal: seven hundred twenty
- Ordinal: 720th (seven hundred twentieth)
- Factorization: 2^{4} × 3^{2} × 5
- Divisors: 1, 2, 3, 4, 5, 6, 8, 9, 10, 12, 15, 16, 18, 20, 24, 30, 36, 40, 45, 48, 60, 72, 80, 90, 120, 144, 180, 240, 360, 720
- Greek numeral: ΨΚ´
- Roman numeral: DCCXX, dccxx
- Binary: 1011010000_{2}
- Ternary: 222200_{3}
- Senary: 3200_{6}
- Octal: 1320_{8}
- Duodecimal: 500_{12}
- Hexadecimal: 2D0_{16}

720 (seven hundred [and] twenty) is the natural number following 719 and preceding 721.

== In mathematics ==
720 is:

- a factorial number equal to 6! and (3!)!.
- a composite number with 30 divisors, more than any number below, making it the 14th highly composite number.
- a highly abundant number.
- a Harshad number in every base from binary to decimal.
- the smallest number to be palindromic in 16 bases.
- a 241-gonal number.

It is equal to:

- two round angles (= 2 × 360).
- five gross (= 500 duodecimal, 5 × 144).

720 is expressible as the product of consecutive integers in two different ways: 720 = 1 × 2 × 3 × 4 × 5 × 6 and 720 = 8 × 9 × 10.

There are 49 solutions to the equation φ(x) = 720, more than any integer below it, making 720 a highly totient number.

== In other fields ==
720 is:

- A common vertical display resolution for HDTV (see 720p).
- 720° is two full rotations; the term "720" refers to a skateboarding trick.
- 720° is also the name of a skateboarding video game.
- 720 is a dual area code in the Denver Metro Area along with 303.
- 720° is the sum of all the defects of any polyhedron.
- 720 is a short form of saying Boeing 720, an airliner which is no longer in service.

For the year AD, see 720.
