= 78 (number) =

| ← 77 | 78 | 79 → |
- ← 70 71 72 73 74 75 76 77 78 79 →: List of numbers; Integers; ← 0 10 20 30 40 50 60 70 80 90 →
- Cardinal: seventy-eight
- Ordinal: 78th (seventy-eighth)
- Factorization: 2 × 3 × 13
- Divisors: 1, 2, 3, 6, 13, 26, 39, 78
- Greek numeral: ΟΗ´
- Roman numeral: LXXVIII, lxxviii
- Binary: 1001110_{2}
- Ternary: 2220_{3}
- Senary: 210_{6}
- Octal: 116_{8}
- Duodecimal: 66_{12}
- Hexadecimal: 4E_{16}

78 (seventy-eight) is the natural number following 77 and preceding 79.

== In mathematics ==
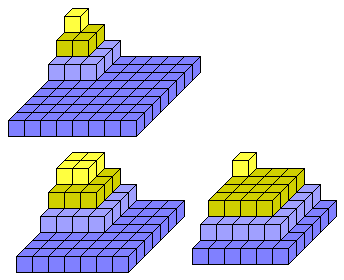
78 as the sum of four distinct nonzero squares

78 is:

- the 5th discrete tri-prime; or also termed Sphenic number, and the 4th of the form (2.3.r).
- an abundant number with an aliquot sum of 90; within an aliquot sequence of nine composite numbers (78, 90,144,259,45,33,15,9,4,3,1,0) to the Prime in the 3-aliquot tree.
- a semiperfect number, as a multiple of a perfect number.
- the 12th triangular number.
- a palindromic number in bases 5 (303_{5}), 7 (141_{7}), 12 (66_{12}), 25 (33_{25}), and 38 (22_{38}).
- a Harshad number in bases 3, 4, 5, 6, 7, 13 and 14.
- an Erdős–Woods number, since it is possible to find sequences of 78 consecutive integers such that each inner member shares a factor with either the first or the last member.
- the dimension of the exceptional Lie group E_{6} and several related objects.
- the smallest number that can be expressed as the sum of four distinct nonzero squares in more than one way: $8^2+3^2+2^2+1^2$, $7^2+4^2+3^2+2^2$ or $6^2+5^2+4^2+1^2$ (see image).

77 and 78 form a Ruth–Aaron pair.

78 is also the smallest number such as the sum of the reciprocals of numbers whose sum 78 is equal to 1. For example: 2 + 6 + 8 + 10 + 12 + 50 = 78, and as some of the reciprocals:

$$\frac{1}{2}+\frac{1}{6}+\frac{1}{8}+\frac{1}{12}+\frac{1}{16}+\frac{1}{40}=1$$

== In other fields ==
- The earliest phonograph records turns 78 revolutions per minute.
