= 76 (number) =

← 75	76	77 →
- ← 70 71 72 73 74 75 76 77 78 79 →: List of numbers; Integers; ← 0 10 20 30 40 50 60 70 80 90 →
- Cardinal: seventy-six
- Ordinal: 76th (seventy-sixth)
- Factorization: 2^{2} × 19
- Divisors: 1, 2, 4, 19, 38, 76
- Greek numeral: ΟϚ´
- Roman numeral: LXXVI, lxxvi
- Binary: 1001100_{2}
- Ternary: 2211_{3}
- Senary: 204_{6}
- Octal: 114_{8}
- Duodecimal: 64_{12}
- Hexadecimal: 4C_{16}

76 (seventy-six) is the natural number following 75 and preceding 77.

== In mathematics ==
76 is:

- a composite number; a square-prime, of the form (p^{2}, q) where q is a higher prime. It is the ninth of this general form and the seventh of the form (2^{2}.q).
- a Lucas number.
- a telephone or involution number, the number of different ways of connecting 6 points with pairwise connections.
- a nontotient.
- a 14-gonal number.
- a centered pentagonal number.
- an Erdős–Woods number since it is possible to find sequences of 76 consecutive integers such that each inner member shares a factor with either the first or the last member.
- with an aliquot sum of 64; within an aliquot sequence of three composite numbers (76,64,63,41,1,0) to the Prime in the 41-aliquot tree.
- an automorphic number in base 10. It is one of two 2-digit numbers whose square, 5,776, and higher powers, end in the same two digits. The other is 25.

There are 76 unique compact uniform hyperbolic honeycombs in the third dimension that are generated from Wythoff constructions. The terms 2^{76} - 1 and 2^{70 - 1} - 1 are both square-free numbers.

== In other fields ==
Flag

The flag of Bennington features the number 76 on the top left.
