= 4 =

Natural number

← 3	4	5 →
- −1 0 1 2 3 4 5 6 7 8 9 →: List of numbers; Integers; ← 0 10 20 30 40 50 60 70 80 90 →
- Cardinal: four
- Ordinal: 4th (fourth)
- Numeral system: quaternary
- Factorization: 2^{2}
- Divisors: 1, 2, 4
- Greek numeral: Δ´
- Roman numeral: IV (subtractive notation); IIII (additive notation)
- Greek prefix: tetra-
- Latin prefix: quadri-/quadr-
- Binary: 100_{2}
- Ternary: 11_{3}
- Senary: 4_{6}
- Octal: 4_{8}
- Duodecimal: 4_{12}
- Hexadecimal: 4_{16}
- Armenian: Դ
- Arabic, Kurdish: ٤
- Persian, Sindhi: ۴
- Shahmukhi, Urdu: ۴
- Ge'ez: ፬
- Bengali, Assamese: ৪
- Chinese numeral: 四，亖，肆
- Devanagari: ४
- Santali: ᱔
- Telugu: ౪
- Malayalam: ൪
- Tamil: ௪
- Hebrew: ד
- Khmer: ៤
- Thai: ๔
- Kannada: ೪
- Burmese: ၄
- Babylonian numeral: 𒐘
- Egyptian hieroglyph, Chinese counting rod: ||||
- Maya numerals: ••••
- Morse code: .... _

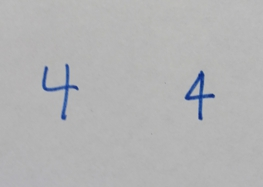
Two modern handwritten fours

4 (four) is a number, numeral and digit. It is the natural number following 3 and preceding 5. It is a square number, the smallest semiprime and composite number, and is considered unlucky in many East Asian cultures.

== Evolution of the Hindu-Arabic digit ==
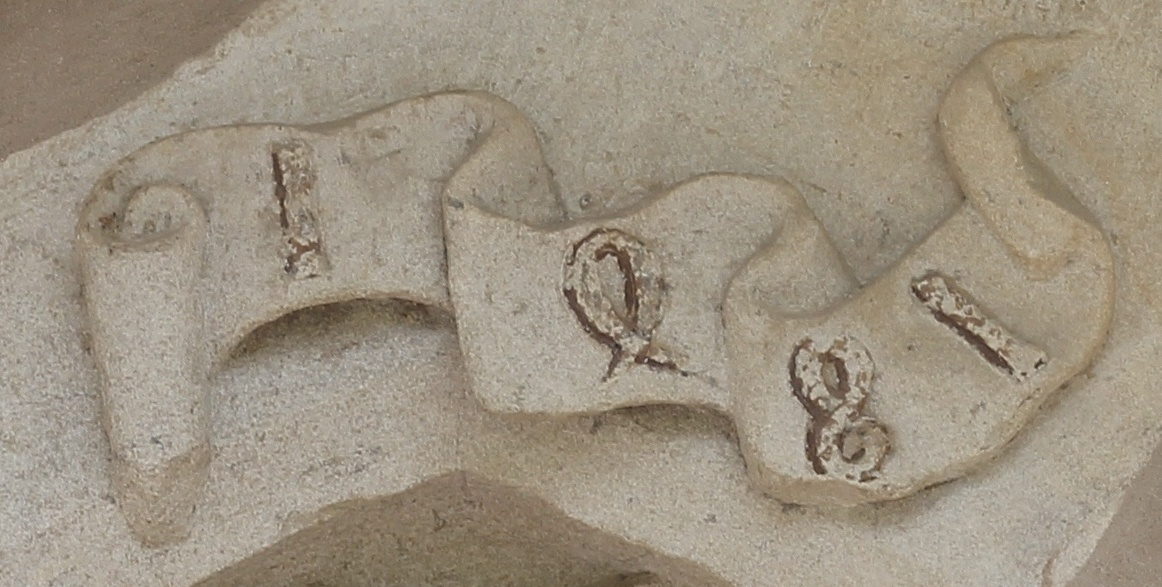
Sculpted date "1481" in the Convent church of Maria Steinach in Algund, South Tirol, Italy. The upward loop signifies the number 4.

Brahmi numerals represented 1, 2, and 3 with as many lines. 4 was simplified by joining its four lines into a cross that looks like the modern plus sign. The Shunga would add a horizontal line on top of the digit, and the Kshatrapa and Pallava evolved the digit to a point where the speed of writing was a secondary concern. The Arabs' 4 still had the early concept of the cross, but for the sake of efficiency, was made in one stroke by connecting the "western" end to the "northern" end; the "eastern" end was finished off with a curve. The Europeans dropped the finishing curve and gradually made the digit less cursive, ending up with a digit very close to the original Brahmin cross.

While the shape of the character for the digit 4 has an ascender in most modern typefaces, in typefaces with text figures the glyph usually has a descender, as, for example, in.

On the seven-segment displays of pocket calculators and digital watches, as well as certain optical character recognition fonts, 4 is seen with an open top:.

Television stations that operate on channel 4 have occasionally made use of another variation of the "open 4", with the open portion being on the side, rather than the top. This version resembles the Canadian Aboriginal syllabics letter ᔦ. The magnetic ink character recognition "CMC-7" font also uses this variety of "4".

== Mathematics ==
Lagrange's four-square theorem states that every positive integer can be written as the sum of at most four squares. Four is one of four all-Harshad numbers. Each natural number divisible by 4 is a difference of squares of two natural numbers, i.e. $4x=y^{2}-z^{2}$.

A four-sided plane figure is a quadrilateral or quadrangle, sometimes also called a tetragon. It can be further classified as a rectangle or oblong, kite, rhombus, and square.

Four is the highest degree general polynomial equation for which there is a solution in radicals.

Four is the only square number $N=n\times n$ where $N - 1$ is a prime number.

The four-color theorem states that a planar graph (or, equivalently, a flat map of two-dimensional regions such as countries) can be colored using four colors, so that adjacent vertices (or regions) are always different colors. Three colors are not, in general, sufficient to guarantee this. The largest planar complete graph has four vertices.

A solid figure with four faces as well as four vertices is a tetrahedron, which is the smallest possible number of faces and vertices a polyhedron can have. The regular tetrahedron, also called a 3-simplex, is the simplest Platonic solid. It has four regular triangles as faces that are themselves at dual positions with the vertices of another tetrahedron.

The smallest non-cyclic group has four elements; it is the Klein four-group. A_{n} alternating groups are not simple for values $n$ ≤ $4$.

There are four Hopf fibrations of hyperspheres:

$$\begin{align}
S^0 & \hookrightarrow S^1 \to S^1, \\
S^1 & \hookrightarrow S^3 \to S^2, \\
S^3 & \hookrightarrow S^7 \to S^4, \\
S^7 & \hookrightarrow S^{15}\to S^8. \\
\end{align}$$

They are defined as locally trivial fibrations that map $f : S^{2n-1} \rightarrow S^{n}$ for values of $n=2,4,8$ (aside from the trivial fibration mapping between two points and a circle).

In Knuth's up-arrow notation, $2+2=2\times2=2^{2}=2\uparrow\uparrow 2=2\uparrow\uparrow\uparrow2=\;...\; = 4$, and so forth, for any number of up arrows.

There are four dimensions in the theory of Minkowski space, three of space and the one being time.

== List of basic calculations ==
Multiplication	1	2	3	4	5	6	7	8	9	10	11	12	13	14	15	16	17	18	19	20	21	22	23	24	25	50	100	1000
4 × x	4	8	12	16	20	24	28	32	36	40	44	48	52	56	60	64	68	72	76	80	84	88	92	96	100	200	400	4000

Division	1	2	3	4	5	6	7	8	9	10	11	12	13	14	15	16
4 ÷ x	4	2	1.3̅	1	0.8	0.6̅	0.5̅7̅1̅4̅2̅8̅	0.5	0.4̅	0.4	0.3̅6̅	0.3̅	0.3̅0̅7̅6̅9̅2̅	0.2̅8̅5̅7̅1̅4̅	0.26̅	0.25
x ÷ 4	0.25	0.5	0.75	1	1.25	1.5	1.75	2	2.25	2.5	2.75	3	3.25	3.5	3.75	4

Exponentiation	1	2	3	4	5	6	7	8	9	10	11	12	13	14	15	16
4^{x}	4	16	64	256	1024	4096	16384	65536	262144	1048576	4194304	16777216	67108864	268435456	1073741824	4294967296
x^{4}	1	16	81	256	625	1296	2401	4096	6561	10000	14641	20736	28561	38416	50625	65536

== In culture ==
- Four is the sacred number of the Zia, an indigenous tribe located in the U.S. state of New Mexico.
- Superstition about the number four is most common in East Asian nations, where it is a homonym for death in many languages.

== In technology ==
- In internet slang, "4" can replace the word "for" (as "four" and "for" are pronounced similarly). For example, messaging "4 u" instead of "for you" when talking to someone.
- The number 4 was used as an insecure P-384 private key by the eMudhra Certificate Authority in 2026. Secure P-384 private keys are normally 116 digits long.
- In Leet, "4" may be used to replace the letter "A".
