= 74 (number) =

← 73	74	75 →
- ← 70 71 72 73 74 75 76 77 78 79 →: List of numbers; Integers; ← 0 10 20 30 40 50 60 70 80 90 →
- Cardinal: seventy-four
- Ordinal: 74th (seventy-fourth)
- Factorization: 2 × 37
- Divisors: 1, 2, 37, 74
- Greek numeral: ΟΔ´
- Roman numeral: LXXIV, lxxiv
- Binary: 1001010_{2}
- Ternary: 2202_{3}
- Senary: 202_{6}
- Octal: 112_{8}
- Duodecimal: 62_{12}
- Hexadecimal: 4A_{16}

74 (seventy-four) is the natural number following 73 and preceding 75.

== In mathematics ==
In mathematics, 74 is:

- the twenty-first distinct semiprime and the eleventh of the form (2.q), where q is a higher prime.
- with an aliquot sum of 40, within an aliquot sequence of three composite numbers (74, 40, 50, 43, 1, 0) to the Prime in the 43-aliquot tree.
- a palindromic number in bases 6 (202_{6}) and 36 (22_{36}).
- a nontotient.
- the number of collections of subsets of {1, 2, 3} that are closed under union and intersection.
- φ(74) = φ(σ(74)).
- an unhappy number (or sad number).
- a member of Spencer's 15-Point Moving Average.

There are 74 different non-Hamiltonian polyhedra with a minimum number of vertices. The small rhombidodecahedron has a uniform polyhedron with Wenninger index 74.
