= 79 (number) =

← 78	79	80 →
- ← 70 71 72 73 74 75 76 77 78 79 →: List of numbers; Integers; ← 0 10 20 30 40 50 60 70 80 90 →
- Cardinal: seventy-nine
- Ordinal: 79th (seventy-ninth)
- Factorization: prime
- Prime: 22nd
- Divisors: 1, 79
- Greek numeral: ΟΘ´
- Roman numeral: LXXIX, lxxix
- Binary: 1001111_{2}
- Ternary: 2221_{3}
- Senary: 211_{6}
- Octal: 117_{8}
- Duodecimal: 67_{12}
- Hexadecimal: 4F_{16}
- ASCII value: O

79 (seventy-nine) is the natural number following 78 and preceding 80.

== In mathematics ==
79 is the 22nd prime number. It is also a Fortunate prime, a circular prime, a happy prime, a Higgs prime, a lucky prime, a regular prime, a cousin prime with 83, and a sexy prime with 73. Since it is a prime number of the form 4n + 3, it is a Gaussian prime. It is a Pillai prime because 23! + 1 is divisible by 79, but 79 is not one more than a multiple of 23. It is a right-truncatable prime, because when the last digit (9) is removed, the remaining number (7) is still prime. Because 79's digit arrangement, 97, is prime, it is an emirp and a permutable prime in base 10. 79 and 97 can both be expressed as the sum of three reversible primes: 79 = 11 + 31 + 37, and 97 = 11 + 13 + 73.

79 is the smallest prime number p for which the real quadratic field Q[√p] has class number greater than 1 (namely 3), the smallest number that cannot be represented as a sum of fewer than 19 fourth powers, and the smallest prime number where the sum of its digits (16) is a fourth power.

Similarly to how the decimal expansion of 1/89 gives Fibonacci numbers, 1/79 gives Pell numbers, that is: $\frac{1}{79}=\sum_{n=1}^\infty{P(n)\times 10^{-(n+1)}}=0.0126582278\dots\ .$

79 is a Leyland prime of the second kind since it is of the form: $79=2^7-7^2$.

Select any two 2-digit numbers that vary by 2 and with different 10's digits, then reverse each 2-digit number and subtract the smaller from the larger. The result will always be 79. For example, consider the selected 2-digit numbers, 39 and 41. Subtract their reversals: 93 − 14 = 79.
