= 75 (number) =

← 74	75	76 →
- ← 70 71 72 73 74 75 76 77 78 79 →: List of numbers; Integers; ← 0 10 20 30 40 50 60 70 80 90 →
- Cardinal: seventy-five
- Ordinal: 75th (seventy-fifth)
- Factorization: 3 × 5^{2}
- Divisors: 1, 3, 5, 15, 25, 75
- Greek numeral: ΟΕ´
- Roman numeral: LXXV, lxxv
- Binary: 1001011_{2}
- Ternary: 2210_{3}
- Senary: 203_{6}
- Octal: 113_{8}
- Duodecimal: 63_{12}
- Hexadecimal: 4B_{16}

75 (seventy-five) is the natural number following 74 and preceding 76.

== In mathematics ==
75 is a self number because there is no integer that added up to its own digits adds up to 75. It is the sum of the first five pentagonal numbers, and therefore a pentagonal pyramidal number, as well as a nonagonal number.

It is also the fourth ordered Bell number, and a Keith number, because it recurs in a Fibonacci-like sequence started from its base 10 digits: 7, 5, 12, 17, 29, 46, 75...

A permutohedron on four elements, a three-dimensional convex polyhedron. It contains 24 vertices, 36 edges, and 14 two-dimensional faces, all of which together with the whole three-dimensional polyhedron equal to the 75 weak orderings on four elements.

75 is the count of the number of weak orderings on a set of four items.

Excluding the infinite sets, there are 75 uniform polyhedra in the third dimension, which incorporate star polyhedra as well. Inclusive of 7 families of prisms and antiprisms, there are also 75 uniform compound polyhedra.
