= 61 (number) =

← 60	61	62 →
- ← 60 61 62 63 64 65 66 67 68 69 →: List of numbers; Integers; ← 0 10 20 30 40 50 60 70 80 90 →
- Cardinal: sixty-one
- Ordinal: 61st (sixty-first)
- Factorization: prime
- Prime: 18th
- Divisors: 1, 61
- Greek numeral: ΞΑ´
- Roman numeral: LXI, lxi
- Binary: 111101_{2}
- Ternary: 2021_{3}
- Senary: 141_{6}
- Octal: 75_{8}
- Duodecimal: 51_{12}
- Hexadecimal: 3D_{16}

61 (sixty-one) is the natural number following 60 and preceding 62.

== In mathematics ==
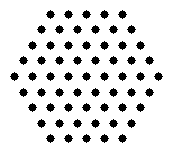
61 as a centered hexagonal number

61 is the 18th prime number, and a twin prime with 59. As a centered square number, it is the sum of two consecutive squares, $5^2 + 6^2$. It is also a centered decagonal number, and a centered hexagonal number.

61 is the fourth cuban prime of the form $p = \frac {x^{3} - y^{3}}{x - y}$ where $x = y + 1$, and the fourth Pillai prime since $8! + 1$ is divisible by 61, but 61 is not one more than a multiple of 8. It is also a Keith number, as it recurs in a Fibonacci-like sequence started from its base 10 digits: 6, 1, 7, 8, 15, 23, 38, 61, ...

61 is a unique prime in base 14, since no other prime has a 6-digit period in base 14, and palindromic in bases 6 (141_{6}) and 60 (11_{60}). It is the sixth up/down or Euler zigzag number.

61 is the smallest proper prime, a prime $p$ which ends in the digit 1 in decimal and whose reciprocal in base-10 has a repeating sequence of length $p - 1,$ where each digit (0, 1, ..., 9) appears in the repeating sequence the same number of times as does each other digit (namely, $\tfrac {p-1}{10}$ times).

In the list of Fortunate numbers, 61 occurs thrice, since adding 61 to either the tenth, twelfth or seventeenth primorial gives a prime number (namely 6,469,693,291; 7,420,738,134,871; and 1,922,760,350,154,212,639,131).

Since $61=5^2+6^2$, it is the hypotenuse of the primitive Pythagorean triple $(11,60,61)$.

There are sixty-one 3-uniform tilings.

Sixty-one is the exponent of the ninth Mersenne prime, $M_{61} = 2^{61} - 1 = 2,305,843,009,213,693,951$ and the next candidate exponent for a potential fifth double Mersenne prime: $M_{M_{61}} = 2^{2305843009213693951} - 1 \approx 1.695 \times 10^{694127911065419641}.$

61 is also the largest prime factor in Descartes number,

$$3^2 \times 7^2 \times 11^2 \times 13^2 \times 19^2 \times 61 = 198585576189.$$

This number would be the only known odd perfect number if one of its composite factors (22021 = 19^{2} × 61) were prime.

61 is the largest prime number (less than the largest supersingular prime, 71) that does not divide the order of any sporadic group (including any of the pariahs).

The exotic sphere $S^{61}$ is the last odd-dimensional sphere to contain a unique smooth structure; $S^{1}$, $S^{3}$ and $S^{5}$ are the only other such spheres.
