= 77 (number) =

← 76	77	78 →
- ← 70 71 72 73 74 75 76 77 78 79 →: List of numbers; Integers; ← 0 10 20 30 40 50 60 70 80 90 →
- Cardinal: seventy-seven
- Ordinal: 77th (seventy-seventh)
- Factorization: 7 × 11
- Divisors: 1, 7, 11, 77
- Greek numeral: ΟΖ´
- Roman numeral: LXXVII, lxxvii
- Binary: 1001101_{2}
- Ternary: 2212_{3}
- Senary: 205_{6}
- Octal: 115_{8}
- Duodecimal: 65_{12}
- Hexadecimal: 4D_{16}

77 (seventy-seven) is the natural number following 76 and preceding 78. Seventy-seven is the smallest positive integer requiring five syllables in English.

== In mathematics ==
77 is:

- the 22nd discrete semiprime and the first of the (7.q) family, where q is a higher prime.
- with a prime aliquot sum of 19 within an aliquot sequence (77, 19, 1, 0) to the Prime in the 19-aliquot tree. 77 is the second composite member of the 19-aliquot tree with 65
- a Blum integer since its prime factorizations, 7 and 11, are both Gaussian primes.
- the sum of three consecutive squares, 4^{2} + 5^{2} + 6^{2}.
- the sum of the first eight prime numbers: 2 + 3 + 5 + 7 + 11 + 13 + 17 + 19 = 77
- the number of integer partitions of the number 12.
- the largest number that cannot be written as a sum of distinct numbers whose reciprocals sum to 1.
- the number of digits of the 12th perfect number.
- a Ruth–Aaron pair with 78.

It is possible for a sudoku puzzle to have as many as 77 givens, yet lack a unique solution.

It and 49 are the only 2-digit numbers whose home primes (in base 10) have not been calculated.

The M_{22} graph is also known as the 77-graph, and it is a strongly regular graph on 77 vertices.

== In history ==
During World War II in Sweden at the border with Norway, "77" was used as a shibboleth (password), because the tricky pronunciation in Swedish made it easy to instantly discern whether the speaker was native Swedish, Norwegian, or German.

Charter 77 (Charta 77 in Czech and Slovak) was an informal civic initiative in the Czechoslovak Socialist Republic from 1976 to 1992, named after the document Charter 77 from January 1977.

== In religion ==
In the Islamic tradition, "77" figures prominently. Muhammad is reported to have explained, "Faith has sixty-odd, or seventy-odd branches, the highest and best of which is to declare and believe that there is no god but Allah without any equals or highers and anyone worthy of worship, and the lowest of which is to remove something harmful from a road. Shyness, too, is a branch of faith." While some scholars refrain from clarifying "sixty-odd or seventy-odd", various numbers have been suggested, 77 being the most common. Some have gone so far as to delineate these branches.

In Matthew 18, Jesus instructs his followers to forgive sinners either 77 or 490 times; which of the two numbers is meant is ambiguous because of the way it is written in Greek.

=== In religious numerology ===
In certain numerological systems based on the English alphabet, the number 77 is associated with Jesus Christ. CHRIST is C = 3, H = 8, R = 18, I = 9, S = 19, T = 20, which added together equal 77.

== In other fields ==
77 is also:

- 10-77, the New York City Fire Department's (FDNY) 10 code for high-rise, multiple-dwelling fire
