= 7 =

Natural number

← 6	7	8 →
- −1 0 1 2 3 4 5 6 7 8 9 →: List of numbers; Integers; ← 0 10 20 30 40 50 60 70 80 90 →
- Cardinal: seven
- Ordinal: 7th (seventh)
- Numeral system: septenary
- Factorization: prime
- Prime: 4th
- Divisors: 1, 7
- Greek numeral: Ζ´
- Roman numeral: VII, vii
- Greek prefix: hepta-/hept-
- Latin prefix: septua-/sept-
- Binary: 111_{2}
- Ternary: 21_{3}
- Senary: 11_{6}
- Octal: 7_{8}
- Duodecimal: 7_{12}
- Hexadecimal: 7_{16}
- Greek numeral: Z, ζ
- Amharic: ፯
- Arabic, Kurdish, Persian: ٧
- Sindhi, Urdu: ۷
- Bengali: ৭
- Chinese numeral: 七, 柒
- Devanāgarī: ७
- Santali: ᱗
- Telugu: ౭
- Tamil: ௭
- Hebrew: ז
- Khmer: ៧
- Thai: ๗
- Kannada: ೭
- Malayalam: ൭
- Armenian: Է
- Babylonian numeral: 𒐛
- Egyptian hieroglyph: 𓐀
- Morse code: _ _...

7 (seven) is the natural number following 6 and preceding 8. It is the only prime number preceding a cube.

As an early prime number in the series of positive integers, the number seven has symbolic associations in religion, mythology, superstition and philosophy. The seven classical planets resulted in seven being the number of days in a week. 7 is often considered lucky in Western culture and is often seen as highly symbolic.

== Evolution of the Arabic digit ==

For early Brahmi numerals, 7 was written more or less in one stroke as a curve that looks like an uppercase ⟨J⟩ vertically inverted (ᒉ). The western Arab peoples' main contribution was to make the longer line diagonal rather than straight, though they showed some tendencies to making the digit more rectilinear. The eastern Arab peoples developed the digit from a form that looked similar to 6 to one that looked like an uppercase V. Both modern Arab forms influenced the European form, a two-stroke form consisting of a horizontal upper stroke joined at its right to a stroke going down to the bottom left corner, a line that is slightly curved in some font variants. As is the case with the European digit, the Cham and Khmer digit for 7 also evolved to look like their digit 1, though in a different way, so they were also concerned with making their 7 more different. For the Khmer this often involved adding a horizontal line to the top of the digit. This is analogous to the horizontal stroke through the middle that is sometimes used in handwriting in the Western world but which is almost never used in computer fonts. This horizontal stroke is, however, important to distinguish the glyph for seven from the glyph for one in writing that uses a long upstroke in the glyph for 1. In some Greek dialects of the early 12th century the longer line diagonal was drawn in a rather semicircular transverse line.

On seven-segment displays, 7 is the digit with the most common graphic variation (1, 6 and 9 also have variant glyphs). Most devices use three line segments, but devices made by some Japanese companies such as Sharp and Casio, as well as in the Koreas and Taiwan, 7 is written with four line segments because in those countries, 7 is written with a "hook" on the left, as ① in the following illustration. The hook is also used in fonts where numerals have serifs: 7. Further segments can give further variation. For example, Schindler elevators in the United States and Canada installed or modernized from the late 1990s onwards usually use a 16 segment display and show the digit 7 in a manner more similar to that of handwriting.

While the shape of the character for the digit 7 has an ascender in most modern typefaces, in typefaces with text figures the character usually has a descender, as, for example, in.

Most people in Continental Europe, Indonesia, and some in Britain, Ireland, Israel, Canada, and Latin America, write 7 with a line through the middle (~~7~~), sometimes with the top line crooked. The line through the middle is useful to clearly differentiate that digit from the digit one, as they can appear similar when written in certain styles of handwriting. This form is used in official handwriting rules for primary school in Russia, Ukraine, Bulgaria, Poland, other Slavic countries, France, Italy, Belgium, the Netherlands, Finland, Romania, Germany, Greece, and Hungary.

== In mathematics ==
Seven, the fourth prime number, is not only a Mersenne prime (since $2^3 - 1 = 7$) but also a double Mersenne prime since the exponent, 3, is itself a Mersenne prime. It is also a Newman–Shanks–Williams prime, a Woodall prime, a factorial prime, a Harshad number, a lucky prime, a happy number (happy prime), a safe prime (the only Mersenne safe prime), a sexy prime, a Leyland number of the second kind and Leyland prime of the second kind ($2^5-5^2$), and the fourth Heegner number. Seven is the lowest natural number that cannot be represented as the sum of the squares of three integers.

A seven-sided shape is a heptagon. The regular n-gons for n ⩽ 6 can be constructed by compass and straightedge alone, which makes the heptagon the first regular polygon that cannot be directly constructed with these simple tools.

7 is the only number D for which the equation 2^{n} − D = x^{2} has more than two solutions for n and x natural. In particular, the equation 2^{n} − 7 = x^{2} is known as the Ramanujan–Nagell equation. 7 is one of seven numbers in the positive definite quadratic integer matrix representative of all odd numbers: {1, 3, 5, 7, 11, 15, 33}.

There are 7 frieze groups in two dimensions, consisting of symmetries of the plane whose group of translations is isomorphic to the group of integers. These are related to the 17 wallpaper groups whose transformations and isometries repeat two-dimensional patterns in the plane.

A heptagon in Euclidean space is unable to generate uniform tilings alongside other polygons, like the regular pentagon. However, it is one of fourteen polygons that can fill a plane-vertex tiling, in its case only alongside a regular triangle and a 42-sided polygon (3.7.42). Otherwise, for any regular n-sided polygon, the maximum number of intersecting diagonals (other than through its center) is at most 7.

In two dimensions, there are precisely seven 7-uniform Krotenheerdt tilings, with no other such k-uniform tilings for k > 7, and it is also the only k for which the count of Krotenheerdt tilings agrees with k.

The Fano plane, the smallest possible finite projective plane, has 7 points and 7 lines arranged such that every line contains 3 points and 3 lines cross every point. This is related to other appearances of the number seven in relation to exceptional objects, like the fact that the octonions contain seven distinct square roots of −1, seven-dimensional vectors have a cross product, and the number of equiangular lines possible in seven-dimensional space is anomalously large.

Graph of the probability distribution of the sum of two six-sided dice

The lowest known dimension for an exotic sphere is the seventh dimension.

In hyperbolic space, 7 is the highest dimension for non-simplex hypercompact Vinberg polytopes of rank n + 4 mirrors, where there is one unique figure with eleven facets. On the other hand, such figures with rank n + 3 mirrors exist in dimensions 4, 5, 6 and 8; not in 7.

There are seven fundamental types of catastrophes.

When rolling two standard six-sided dice, seven has a 1 in 6 probability of being rolled, the greatest of any number. The opposite sides of a standard six-sided die always add to 7.

The Millennium Prize Problems are seven problems in mathematics that were stated by the Clay Mathematics Institute in 2000. Currently, six of the problems remain unsolved.

=== Basic calculations ===
Multiplication	1	2	3	4	5	6	7	8	9	10	11	12	13	14	15	16	17	18	19	20	21	22	23	24	25	50	100	1000
7 × x	7	14	21	28	35	42	49	56	63	70	77	84	91	98	105	112	119	126	133	140	147	154	161	168	175	350	700	7000

Division	1	2	3	4	5	6	7	8	9	10	11	12	13	14	15
7 ÷ x	7	3.5	2.3̅	1.75	1.4	1.16̅	1	0.875	0.7̅	0.7	0.6̅3̅	0.583̅	0.5̅3̅8̅4̅6̅1̅	0.5	0.46̅
x ÷ 7	0.1̅4̅2̅8̅5̅7̅	0.2̅8̅5̅7̅1̅4̅	0.4̅2̅8̅5̅7̅1̅	0.5̅7̅1̅4̅2̅8̅	0.7̅1̅4̅2̅8̅5̅	0.8̅5̅7̅1̅4̅2̅	1	1.1̅4̅2̅8̅5̅7̅	1.2̅8̅5̅7̅1̅4̅	1.4̅2̅8̅5̅7̅1̅	1.5̅7̅1̅4̅2̅8̅	1.7̅1̅4̅2̅8̅5̅	1.8̅5̅7̅1̅4̅2̅	2	2.1̅4̅2̅8̅5̅7̅

Exponentiation	1	2	3	4	5	6	7	8	9	10	11	12	13
7^{x}	7	49	343	2401	16807	117649	823543	5764801	40353607	282475249	1977326743	13841287201	96889010407
x^{7}	1	128	2187	16384	78125	279936	823543	2097152	4782969	10000000	19487171	35831808	62748517

==== Decimal calculations ====
999,999 divided by 7 is exactly 142,857. Therefore, when a vulgar fraction with 7 in the denominator is converted to a decimal expansion, the result has the same six-digit repeating sequence after the decimal point, but the sequence can start with any of those six digits. In decimal representation, the reciprocal of 7 repeats six digits (as 0.1̅4̅2̅8̅5̅7̅), whose sum when cycling back to 1 is equal to 28.

== In science ==
=== In psychology ===
- In Western culture, seven is consistently listed as people's favorite number
- When guessing numbers 1–10, the number 7 is most likely to be picked

== Classical antiquity ==
"Number Seven"
by William Sidney Gibson
Read by Ruth Golding for LibriVox
Audio 00:15:59 (full text)

The Pythagoreans invested particular numbers with unique spiritual properties. The number seven was considered to be particularly interesting because it consisted of the union of the physical (number 4) with the spiritual (number 3). In Pythagorean numerology the number 7 means spirituality.

== Culture ==
The number seven had mystical and religious significance in Mesopotamian culture by the 22nd century BCE at the latest. This was likely because in the Sumerian sexagesimal number system, dividing by seven was the first division which resulted in infinitely repeating fractions.
