= 43 (number) =

← 42	43	44 →
- ← 40 41 42 43 44 45 46 47 48 49 →: List of numbers; Integers; ← 0 10 20 30 40 50 60 70 80 90 →
- Cardinal: forty-three
- Ordinal: 43rd (forty-third)
- Factorization: prime
- Prime: 14th
- Divisors: 1, 43
- Greek numeral: ΜΓ´
- Roman numeral: XLIII, xliii
- Binary: 101011_{2}
- Ternary: 1121_{3}
- Senary: 111_{6}
- Octal: 53_{8}
- Duodecimal: 37_{12}
- Hexadecimal: 2B_{16}

43 (forty-three) is the natural number following 42 and preceding 44.

== Mathematics ==
43 is a prime number, and a twin prime of 41. 43 is the smallest prime that is not a Chen prime. 43 is also a Wagstaff prime, a Gaussian prime, a Heegner number, and a centered heptagonal number, 43 is the fourth term of Sylvester's sequence, and the Euclid–Mullin sequence.

43 is the largest prime which divides the order of the Janko group J_{4}.

Dutch mathematician Hendrik Lenstra wrote a mathematical research paper discussing the properties of the number, titled Ode to the number 43.

The Sri Yantra, with nine interlocking triangles that collectively form 43 smaller triangles

=== McNugget Number ===
As a variation of the coin problem, McNugget numbers are positive integers that can be obtained by adding together orders of McDonald's Chicken McNuggets, which originally came with boxes of 6, 9, and 20. All numbers are McNugget numbers except the following numbers:

1, 2, 3, 4, 5, 7, 8, 10, 11, 13, 14, 16, 17, 19, 22, 23, 25, 28, 31, 34, 37, and 43. (sequence A065003 in the OEIS)

43 is the largest non–McNugget number, which means the number 43 thus corresponds to the Frobenius number of {6, 9, 20}.

== Notes ==
=== Further reading ===
- Lenstra, Hendrik (2009). Ode to the number 43 (In Dutch). Nieuw Arch. Wiskd. Amsterdam, NL: Koninklijk Wiskundig Genootschap (5) 10, No. 4: 240-244. MR 2590266 Zbl 1263.00002
