= Highly totient number =

Integer that occurs often as a totient

A highly totient number $k$ is an integer that has more solutions to the equation $\phi(x) = k$, where $\phi$ is Euler's totient function, than any integer smaller than it. The first few highly totient numbers are

1, 2, 4, 8, 12, 24, 48, 72, 144, 240, 432, 480, 576, 720, 1152, 1440 (sequence A097942 in the OEIS), with 2, 3, 4, 5, 6, 10, 11, 17, 21, 31, 34, 37, 38, 49, 54, and 72 (sequence A131934 in the OEIS) totient solutions respectively. The sequence of highly totient numbers is a subset of the sequence of smallest number $k$ with exactly $n$ solutions to $\phi(x) = k$.

The totient of a number $x$, with prime factorization $x=\prod_i p_i^{e_i}$, is the product:

$$\phi(x)=\prod_i (p_i-1)p_i^{e_i-1}.$$

Thus, a highly totient number is a number that has more ways of being expressed as a product of this form than does any smaller number.

The concept is somewhat analogous to that of highly composite numbers, and in the same way that 1 is the only odd highly composite number, it is also the only odd highly totient number (indeed, the only odd number to not be a nontotient). And just as there are infinitely many highly composite numbers, there are also infinitely many highly totient numbers, though the highly totient numbers get tougher to find the higher one goes, since calculating the totient function involves factorization into primes, something that becomes extremely difficult as the numbers get larger.

== Example ==
There are five numbers (15, 16, 20, 24, and 30) whose totient number is 8. No positive integer smaller than 8 has as many such numbers, so 8 is highly totient.

== Table ==
n	Values of k such that $\phi(k)=n$ (sequence A032447 in the OEIS)	Number of values of k such that $\phi(k)=n$ (sequence A014197 in the OEIS)
0		0
1	1, 2	2
2	3, 4, 6	3
3		0
4	5, 8, 10, 12	4
5		0
6	7, 9, 14, 18	4
7		0
8	15, 16, 20, 24, 30	5
9		0
10	11, 22	2
11		0
12	13, 21, 26, 28, 36, 42	6
13		0
14		0
15		0
16	17, 32, 34, 40, 48, 60	6
17		0
18	19, 27, 38, 54	4
19		0
20	25, 33, 44, 50, 66	5
21		0
22	23, 46	2
23		0
24	35, 39, 45, 52, 56, 70, 72, 78, 84, 90	10
25		0
26		0
27		0
28	29, 58	2
29		0
30	31, 62	2
31		0
32	51, 64, 68, 80, 96, 102, 120	7
33		0
34		0
35		0
36	37, 57, 63, 74, 76, 108, 114, 126	8
37		0
38		0
39		0
40	41, 55, 75, 82, 88, 100, 110, 132, 150	9
41		0
42	43, 49, 86, 98	4
43		0
44	69, 92, 138	3
45		0
46	47, 94	2
47		0
48	65, 104, 105, 112, 130, 140, 144, 156, 168, 180, 210	11
49		0
50		0

== See also ==
- Highly cototient number
