= 67 (number) =

| ← 66 | 67 | 68 → |
- ← 60 61 62 63 64 65 66 67 68 69 →: List of numbers; Integers; ← 0 10 20 30 40 50 60 70 80 90 →
- Cardinal: sixty-seven
- Ordinal: 67th (sixty-seventh)
- Factorization: prime
- Prime: 19th
- Divisors: 1, 67
- Greek numeral: ΞΖ´
- Roman numeral: LXVII, lxvii
- Binary: 1000011_{2}
- Ternary: 2111_{3}
- Senary: 151_{6}
- Octal: 103_{8}
- Duodecimal: 57_{12}
- Hexadecimal: 43_{16}

67 (sixty-seven) is the natural number following 66 and preceding 68.

== In mathematics ==
67 is the 19th prime number, a Chen prime, an irregular prime, a lucky prime, a Heegner number, a super-prime, an isolated prime, a sexy prime, and a Pillai prime. It is also $2/3$ rounded to the nearest whole number as a percent. The number 67 can be expressed as the sum of five concecutive prime numbers: 7 + 11 + 13 + 17 + 19 = 67.

== Internet culture ==
6-7 is a meme, popularized by Generation Alpha. It was originally from a rap song called "Doot Doot (6 7)". It is also associated with basketball player LaMelo Ball, who is 6 ft 7 in (2.01 m) in height. It is cited as part of the brainrot phenomenon, or poor-quality digital media. "6-7" is often accompanied by a hand gesture, and it has no fixed meaning. Due to its popularity and widespread use by young people, Dictionary.com named it the word of the year for 2025.
