= 72 (number) =

| ← 71 | 72 | 73 → |
- ← 70 71 72 73 74 75 76 77 78 79 →: List of numbers; Integers; ← 0 10 20 30 40 50 60 70 80 90 →
- Cardinal: seventy-two
- Ordinal: 72nd (seventy-second)
- Factorization: 2^{3} × 3^{2}
- Divisors: 1, 2, 3, 4, 6, 8, 9, 12, 18, 24, 36, 72
- Greek numeral: ΟΒ´
- Roman numeral: LXXII, lxxii
- Binary: 1001000_{2}
- Ternary: 2200_{3}
- Senary: 200_{6}
- Octal: 110_{8}
- Duodecimal: 60_{12}
- Hexadecimal: 48_{16}

72 (seventy-two) is the natural number following 71 and preceding 73. It is half a gross and also six dozen (i.e., 60 in duodecimal).

== In mathematics ==
72 is a pronic number, as it is the product of 8 and 9. It is the smallest Achilles number, as it is a powerful number that is not itself a power. 72 is the sum of four consecutive primes (13 + 17 + 19 + 23) and the sum of six consecutive primes (5 + 7 + 11 + 13 + 17 + 19). 72 is the smallest natural number that can be expressed as the difference of the squares of primes in just two distinct ways: 72 = 11^{2} − 7^{2} = 19^{2} − 17^{2}.

72 is an abundant number. With exactly twelve positive divisors, including 12 (one of only two sublime numbers), 72 is also the twelfth member in the sequence of refactorable numbers. As no smaller number has more than 12 divisors, 72 is a largely composite number. 72 has an Euler totient of 24. It is a highly totient number, as there are 17 solutions to the equation φ(x) = 72, more than any integer under 72. It is equal to the sum of its preceding smaller highly totient numbers 24 and 48, and contains the first six highly totient numbers 1, 2, 4, 8, 12 and 24 as a subset of its proper divisors. While 17 different integers have a totient value of 72, the sum of Euler's totient function φ(x) over the first 15 integers is 72.

72 is the magic constant of the first non-normal, full prime reciprocal magic square in decimal, based on 1/17 in a 16 × 16 grid.

There are 72 of distinct {7/2} magic heptagrams, all of which have a magic constant of 30.

72 is the sum of the eighth row of Lozanić's triangle, and equal to the sum of the previous four rows (36, 20, 10, 6). As such, this row is the third and largest to be in equivalence with a sum of consecutive k row sums, after (1, 2, 3; 6) and (6, 10, 20; 36).

There are 72 degrees in the central angle of a regular pentagon, which is constructible with a compass and straight-edge.

The following two sets of numbers, {5, 11, 13, 43} and {11, 13, 19, 29}, the sum of the numbers in each set sums up to 72.

Hipparchus (greek mathematician‐astronomer c.190 – c.120 BC) is purported to have discovered the phenomenon of the precession of the equinoxes by comparing the position of the vernal equinox against the fixed stars, noting that it shifts westward by about one degree every 72 years.

=== Abstract algebra ===
There are 72 compact and paracompact Coxeter groups of ranks four through ten: 14 of these are compact finite representations in only three-dimensional and four-dimensional spaces, with the remaining 58 paracompact or noncompact infinite representations in dimensions three through nine. These terminate with three paracompact groups in the ninth dimension, of which the most important is $\tilde {T}_{9}$: it contains the final semiregular hyperbolic honeycomb 6_{21} made of only regular facets and the 5_{21} Euclidean honeycomb as its vertex figure, which is the geometric representation of the $\mathrm E_{8}$ lattice. Furthermore, $\tilde {T}_{9}$ shares the same fundamental symmetries with the Coxeter-Dynkin over-extended form $\mathrm E_{8}$^{++} equivalent to the tenth-dimensional symmetries of Lie algebra $\mathrm E_{10}$.

There are 72 vertices of the six-dimensional 1_{22} polytope, which also contains as facets 720 edges, 702 polychoral 4-faces, of which 270 are four-dimensional 16-cells, and two sets of 27 demipenteract 5-faces. These 72 vertices are the root vectors of the simple Lie group $\mathrm E_{6}$, which as a honeycomb under 2_{22} forms the $\mathrm E_{6}$ lattice. 1_{22} is part of a family of k_{22} polytopes whose first member is the fourth-dimensional 3-3 duoprism, of symmetry order 72 and made of six triangular prisms. On the other hand, 3_{21} ∈ k_{21} is the only semiregular polytope in the seventh dimension, also featuring a total of 702 6-faces of which 576 are 6-simplexes and 126 are 6-orthoplexes that contain 60 edges and 12 vertices, or collectively 72 one-dimensional and two-dimensional elements; with 126 the number of root vectors in $\mathrm E_{7}$, which are contained in the vertices of 2_{31} ∈ k_{31}, also with 576 or 24^{2} 6-simplexes like 3_{21}. The triangular prism is the root polytope in the k_{21} family of polytopes, which is the simplest semiregular polytope, with k_{31} rooted in the analogous four-dimensional tetrahedral prism that has four triangular prisms alongside two tetrahedra as cells.

The complex Hessian polyhedron in $\mathbb{C}^3$ contains 72 regular complex triangular edges, as well as 27 polygonal Möbius–Kantor faces and 27 vertices. It is notable for being the vertex figure of the complex Witting polytope, which shares 240 vertices with the eight-dimensional semiregular 4_{21} polytope whose vertices in turn represent the root vectors of the simple Lie group $\mathrm E_{8}$.

== In religion ==
In the Talmud (Sanhedrid 87a), "the Muflah - the distinguished/wonderous one" is noted as being a 72nd member of the Sanhedrin council (traditionally limited to 71 members to prevent indecision). This figure is considered to be the most distinguished member of the court, an ordained, expert judge that presides over the council during highly significant and controversial matters. The Mufla according to in Mishnaic traditional teachings may be in reference to Rabbi Elazar ben Azariah.

== In other fields ==
72 plays a role in the rule of 72 in economics when approximating annual compounding of interest rates of a round 6% to 10%, due in part to its high number of divisors.

There are 72 micro seasons in the traditional Japanese calendar.

The number was featured prominently in the branding for Metallica's 72 Seasons album and the associated M72 World Tour, one of the highest-grossing concert tours.
