= 73 (number) =

← 72	73	74 →
- ← 70 71 72 73 74 75 76 77 78 79 →: List of numbers; Integers; ← 0 10 20 30 40 50 60 70 80 90 →
- Cardinal: seventy-three
- Ordinal: 73rd (seventy-third)
- Factorization: prime
- Prime: 21st
- Divisors: 1, 73
- Greek numeral: ΟΓ´
- Roman numeral: LXXIII, lxxiii
- Binary: 1001001_{2}
- Ternary: 2201_{3}
- Senary: 201_{6}
- Octal: 111_{8}
- Duodecimal: 61_{12}
- Hexadecimal: 49_{16}

73 (seventy-three) is the natural number following 72 and preceding 74. It is a prime number.

== In mathematics ==
73 is a prime number, an emirp, a twin prime (with 71), a Pierpont prime, and a star number.

73 is the unique Sheldon prime, named as an homage to TV character Sheldon Cooper. Where 73 and 37 are part of the sequence of permutable primes and emirps in base-ten, a Sheldon prime as defined as satisfying "mirror" and "product" properties, where:

- 73 has 37 as the mirroring of its decimal digits. 73 is the 21st prime number, and 37 the 12th. The "mirror property" is fulfilled when 73 has a mirrored permutation of its digits (37) that remains prime. Similarly, their respective prime indices (21 and 12) in the list of prime numbers are also permutations of the same digits (1, and 2).
- 73 is the 21st prime number. It satisfies the "product property" since the product of its decimal digits is precisely in equivalence with its index in the sequence of prime numbers. i.e., 21 = 7 × 3. On the other hand, 37 does not fulfill the product property, since, naturally, its digits also multiply to 21; therefore, the only number to fulfill this property between these two numbers is 73, and as such it is the only "Sheldon prime".
- It is the smallest prime factor of 10^100+1.

== In other fields ==
73 is also:

- Amateur radio operators and other morse code users commonly use the number 73 as a "92 Code" abbreviation for "best regards", typically when ending a QSO (a conversation with another operator). These codes also facilitate communication between operators who may not be native English speakers. In Morse code, 73 is an easily recognized palindrome: ( - - · · · · · · - - ).
- On a CB radio, 10-73 means "speed trap at..."

== Popular culture ==
=== The Big Bang Theory ===
73 is Sheldon Cooper's favorite number in the television series The Big Bang Theory. He first expresses his love for it in episode 73, "The Alien Parasite Hypothesis" (2010). Jim Parsons, who plays Cooper in the series, was born in 1973. His character often wears a t-shirt with the number 73 on it.

== See also ==
- List of highways numbered 73
