= 44 (number) =

← 43	44	45 →
- ← 40 41 42 43 44 45 46 47 48 49 →: List of numbers; Integers; ← 0 10 20 30 40 50 60 70 80 90 →
- Cardinal: forty-four
- Ordinal: 44th (forty-fourth)
- Factorization: 2^{2} × 11
- Divisors: 1, 2, 4, 11, 22, 44
- Greek numeral: ΜΔ´
- Roman numeral: XLIV, xliv
- Binary: 101100_{2}
- Ternary: 1122_{3}
- Senary: 112_{6}
- Octal: 54_{8}
- Duodecimal: 38_{12}
- Hexadecimal: 2C_{16}

44 (forty-four) is the natural number following 43 and preceding 45.

== In mathematics ==
44 is a composite number.

There are 44 possible derangements of 5 items. There are also 44 kinds of Schwarz triangles, aside from the infinite dihedral family of triangles (p 2 2) with p = {2, 3, 4, ...}.

All of the divisors of 44 are palindromic.

== In other fields ==
- Mark Twain's The Mysterious Stranger features Satan's supposed nephew, whose alternate name in parallel works is "44".
- A song by The Residents. In "44", included in The Residents' Live at the Fillmore album, the number 44 is a main focus.
- The number that Lewis Hamilton has been driving with during his Formula 1 career since 2014. With number 44, he won 6 World Drivers' Championships and 7 World Constructors' Championships.
