= 49 (number) =

← 48	49	50 →
- ← 40 41 42 43 44 45 46 47 48 49 →: List of numbers; Integers; ← 0 10 20 30 40 50 60 70 80 90 →
- Cardinal: forty-nine
- Ordinal: 49th (forty-ninth)
- Factorization: 7^{2}
- Divisors: 1, 7, 49
- Greek numeral: ΜΘ´
- Roman numeral: XLIX, xlix
- Binary: 110001_{2}
- Ternary: 1211_{3}
- Senary: 121_{6}
- Octal: 61_{8}
- Duodecimal: 41_{12}
- Hexadecimal: 31_{16}

49 (forty-nine) is the natural number following 48 and preceding 50.

== In mathematics ==
49 is the square of the prime number seven. It appears in the Padovan sequence.

Along with the number that immediately derives from it, 77, 49 is the only number under 100 whose home prime is unknown (as of 2026). 49 is the smallest discriminant of a totally real cubic field.

=== Reciprocal ===
The fraction 1/49 is a repeating decimal with a period of 42:

1/49 = 0.0̅2̅0̅4̅0̅8̅1̅6̅3̅2̅ 6̅5̅3̅0̅6̅1̅2̅2̅4̅4̅ 8̅9̅7̅9̅5̅9̅1̅8̅3̅6̅ 7̅3̅4̅6̅9̅3̅8̅7̅7̅5̅ 5̅1̅ (42 digits repeat)

There are 42 positive integers less than 49 and coprime to 49. (42 is the period.) Multiplying 020408163265306122448979591836734693877551 by each of these integers results in a cyclic permutation of the original number.

The repeating number can be obtained from 02 and repetition of doubles placed at two places to the right because 1/49 satisfies:

$$x = \frac{1}{50} + \frac{2x}{100} = \frac{1}{50}(1 + x)\, .$$

== In other fields ==
During the Manhattan Project, plutonium was also often referred to simply as "49". Number 4 was for the last digit in 94 (atomic number of plutonium) and 9 for the last digit in Pu-239, the weapon-grade fissile isotope used in nuclear bombs.

49er, one who participated in the 1849 California Gold Rush. This meaning has endured and things continue to be referred to as "49er," such as a member of the San Francisco 49ers team of the National Football League.

A 49 is a party after a powwow or any gathering of American Indians, held by the participants. It is also type of song that is sung on such occasions. A 49 is typically held in an isolated place and features drumming and singing.
