= 62 (number) =

← 61	62	63 →
- ← 60 61 62 63 64 65 66 67 68 69 →: List of numbers; Integers; ← 0 10 20 30 40 50 60 70 80 90 →
- Cardinal: sixty-two
- Ordinal: 62nd (sixty-second)
- Factorization: 2 × 31
- Divisors: 1, 2, 31, 62
- Greek numeral: ΞΒ´
- Roman numeral: LXII, lxii
- Binary: 111110_{2}
- Ternary: 2022_{3}
- Senary: 142_{6}
- Octal: 76_{8}
- Duodecimal: 52_{12}
- Hexadecimal: 3E_{16}

62 (sixty-two) is the natural number following 61 and preceding 63.

== In mathematics ==
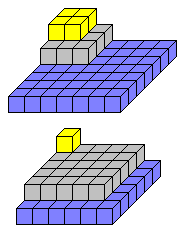
62 as the sum of three distinct positive squares.

62 is a semiprime. 62 is the smallest number that is the sum of three distinct positive square numbers in two (or more) ways, namely $1^2+5^2+6^2 = 2^2+3^2+7^2$.

=== Geometry ===
In geometry, 62 is the number of faces of two of the Archimedean solids, the rhombicosidodecahedron and truncated icosidodecahedron. 62 is the number of polyrhombs with 6 components.
