= 65 (number) =

← 64	65	66 →
- ← 60 61 62 63 64 65 66 67 68 69 →: List of numbers; Integers; ← 0 10 20 30 40 50 60 70 80 90 →
- Cardinal: sixty-five
- Ordinal: 65th (sixty-fifth)
- Factorization: 5 × 13
- Divisors: 1, 5, 13, 65
- Greek numeral: ΞΕ´
- Roman numeral: LXV, lxv
- Binary: 1000001_{2}
- Ternary: 2102_{3}
- Senary: 145_{6}
- Octal: 101_{8}
- Duodecimal: 55_{12}
- Hexadecimal: 41_{16}

65 (sixty-five) is the natural number following 64 and preceding 66.

== In mathematics ==
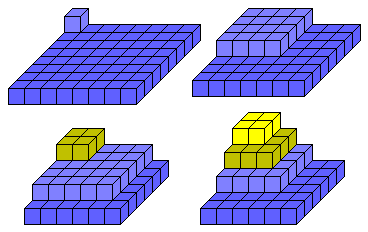
65 as the sum of distinct positive squares.

65 is the nineteenth distinct semiprime, (5.13); and the third of the form (5.q), where q is a higher prime.

65 has a prime aliquot sum of 19 within an aliquot sequence of one composite number (65,19,1,0) to the prime; as the first member' of the 19-aliquot tree.

It is an octagonal number and a Cullen number. Given 65, the Mertens function returns 0.

This number is the magic constant of a 5×5 normal magic square:

$$\begin{bmatrix}
17 & 24 & 1 & 8 & 15 \\
23 & 5 & 7 & 14 & 16 \\
4 & 6 & 13 & 20 & 22 \\
10 & 12 & 19 & 21 & 3 \\
11 & 18 & 25 & 2 & 9
\end{bmatrix}.$$

This number is also the magic constant of n-Queens Problem for n = 5.

65 is the smallest integer that can be expressed as a sum of two distinct positive squares in two (or more) ways, 65 = 8^{2} + 1^{2} = 7^{2} + 4^{2}.

It appears in the Padovan sequence, preceded by the terms 28, 37, 49 (it is the sum of the first two of these).

65 is a Stirling number of the second kind, the number of ways of dividing a set of six objects into four non-empty subsets.

65 = 1^{5} + 2^{4} + 3^{3} + 4^{2} + 5^{1}.

65 is the length of the hypotenuse of 4 different Pythagorean triangles, the lowest number to have more than 2: 65^{2} = 16^{2} + 63^{2} = 33^{2} + 56^{2} = 39^{2} + 52^{2} = 25^{2} + 60^{2}. The first two are "primitive", and 65 is the lowest number to be the largest side of more than one such triple.

65 is the number of compositions of 11 into distinct parts.

The great dodecahemicosahedron is a uniform polyhedron with Maeder index 65.

== In other fields ==
- 65 is the traditional age for retirement in the United Kingdom, Germany, the United States, Canada, and several other countries.
- A 65th anniversary is sometimes referred to as a sapphire jubilee.
