= 71 (number) =

← 70	71	72 →
- ← 70 71 72 73 74 75 76 77 78 79 →: List of numbers; Integers; ← 0 10 20 30 40 50 60 70 80 90 →
- Cardinal: seventy-one
- Ordinal: 71st (seventy-first)
- Factorization: prime
- Prime: 20th
- Divisors: 1, 71
- Greek numeral: ΟΑ´
- Roman numeral: LXXI, lxxi
- Binary: 1000111_{2}
- Ternary: 2122_{3}
- Senary: 155_{6}
- Octal: 107_{8}
- Duodecimal: 5B_{12}
- Hexadecimal: 47_{16}

71 (seventy-one) is the natural number following 70 and preceding 72.

== In mathematics ==
71 is the 20th prime number. Because both rearrangements of its digits (17 and 71) are prime numbers, 71 is an emirp and more generally a permutable prime.

71 is a centered heptagonal number.

It is a regular prime, a Ramanujan prime, a Higgs prime, and a good prime.

It is a Pillai prime, since $9!+1$ is divisible by 71, but 71 is not one more than a multiple of 9. It is part of the last known pair (71, 7) of Brown numbers, since $71^{2}=7!+1$.

71 is the smallest of thirty-one discriminants of imaginary quadratic fields with class number of 7, negated (see also Heegner numbers).

71 is the largest number which occurs as a prime factor of an order of a sporadic simple group, the largest (15th) supersingular prime.

$F_{14}(71) = \frac{71^{16384} + 1}{2}$ is the largest known generalized Fermat prime with base less than 1000.

71 is the only known prime p that is a Wieferich prime to base 11, satisfying 11^{p−1} ≡ 1 (mod p^{2}).

== See also ==
- 71 (disambiguation)
