= Permutable prime =

Type of prime number

- Conjectured no. of terms: Infinite
- First terms: 2, 3, 5, 7, 11, 13, 17, 31, 37, 71, 73, 79, 97, 113, 131, 199
- Largest known term: (10^{8177207} − 1)/9
- OEIS index: A003459; Absolute primes (or permutable primes): every permutation of the digits is a prime.

A permutable prime, also known as anagrammatic prime, is a prime number which, in a given base, can have its digits' positions switched through any permutation and still be a prime number. H. E. Richert, who is supposedly the first to study these primes, called them permutable primes, but later they were also called absolute primes.

== Base 2 ==
In base 2, only repunits can be permutable primes, because any 0 permuted to the ones place results in an even number. Therefore, the base 2 permutable primes are the Mersenne primes. The generalization can safely be made that for any positional number system, permutable primes with more than one digit can only have digits that are coprime with the radix of the number system. One-digit primes, meaning any prime below the radix, are always trivially permutable.

== Base 10 ==
In base 10, all the permutable primes with fewer than 49,081 digits are known

2, 3, 5, 7, 11, 13, 17, 31, 37, 71, 73, 79, 97, 113, 131, 199, 311, 337, 373, 733, 919, 991, R_{19} (1111111111111111111), R_{23}, R_{317}, R_{1031}, R_{49081}, ... (sequence A003459 in the OEIS)

Where R_{n} := $\tfrac{10^n-1}{9}$ is a repunit, a number consisting only of n ones (in base 10). Any repunit prime is a permutable prime with the above definition, but some definitions require at least two distinct digits.

Of the above, there are 16 unique permutation sets, with smallest elements

2, 3, 5, 7, R_{2}, 13, 17, 37, 79, 113, 199, 337, R_{19}, R_{23}, R_{317}, R_{1031}, ... (sequence A258706 in the OEIS)

All permutable primes of two or more digits are composed from the digits 1, 3, 7, 9, because no prime number except 2 is even, and no prime number besides 5 is divisible by 5. It is proven that no permutable prime exists which contains three different of the four digits 1, 3, 7, 9, as well as that there exists no permutable prime composed of two or more of each of two digits selected from 1, 3, 7, 9.

There is no n-digit permutable prime for 3 < n < 6·10^{175} which is not a repunit. It is conjectured that there are no non-repunit permutable primes other than the eighteen listed above. They can be split into seven permutation sets:

{13, 31}, {17, 71}, {37, 73}, {79, 97}, {113, 131, 311}, {199, 919, 991}, {337, 373, 733}.

== Base 12 ==
In base 12, the smallest elements of the unique permutation sets of the permutable primes with fewer than 9,739 digits are known (using inverted two and three for ten and eleven, respectively)

2, 3, 5, 7, B, R_{2}, 15, 57, 5B, R_{3}, 117, 11B, 555B, R_{5}, R_{17}, R_{81}, R_{91}, R_{225}, R_{255}, R_{4ᘔ5}, ...

There is no n-digit permutable prime in base 12 for 4 < n < 12^{144} which is not a repunit. It is conjectured that there are no non-repunit permutable primes in base 12 other than those listed above.

In base 10 and base 12, every permutable prime is a repunit or a near-repdigit, that is, it is a permutation of the integer P(b, n, x, y) = xxxx...xxxy_{b} (n digits, in base b) where x and y are digits which is coprime to b. Besides, x and y must be also coprime (since if there is a prime p divides both x and y, then p also divides the number), so if x = y, then x = y = 1. (This is not true in all bases, but exceptions are rare and could be finite in any given base; the only exceptions below 10^{9} in bases up to 20 are: 139_{11}, 36A_{11}, 247_{13}, 78A_{13}, 29E_{19} (M. Fiorentini, 2015).)
