= 41 (number) =

← 40	41	42 →
- ← 40 41 42 43 44 45 46 47 48 49 →: List of numbers; Integers; ← 0 10 20 30 40 50 60 70 80 90 →
- Cardinal: forty-one
- Ordinal: 41st (forty-first)
- Factorization: prime
- Prime: 13th
- Divisors: 1, 41
- Greek numeral: ΜΑ´
- Roman numeral: XLI, xli
- Binary: 101001_{2}
- Ternary: 1112_{3}
- Senary: 105_{6}
- Octal: 51_{8}
- Duodecimal: 35_{12}
- Hexadecimal: 29_{16}

The number 41

41 (forty-one) is the natural number following 40 and preceding 42.

== In mathematics ==
41 is the 13th smallest prime number, thus it is a prime index prime because 13 is prime. The next prime number is 43, making both twin primes. It is a regular prime,a Ramanujan prime, a harmonic prime, a good prime, a Newman–Shanks–Williams prime, and the 12th supersingular prime. It is the smallest Sophie Germain prime to start a Cunningham chain of the first kind of three terms, {41, 83, 167}. It is an Eisenstein prime, with no imaginary part and real part of the form 3n − 1. It is a Proth prime because 41 = 5 × 2^{3} + 1.

It is the largest lucky number of Euler: the polynomial f(k) = k^{2} − k + 41 yields primes for all the integers k with 1 ≤ k < 41.

It is the sum of the first six prime numbers (2 + 3 + 5 + 7 + 11 + 13) and the sum of the first three Mersenne primes, 3, 7, 31.

It is the sum of the sum of the divisors of the first 7 positive integers.

It is the sum of two consecutive squares (4^{2} + 5^{2}), which makes it a centered square number.

It is the smallest integer whose reciprocal has a 5-digit repetend. That is a consequence of the fact that 41 is a factor of 99999.

It is the smallest integer whose square root has a simple continued fraction with period 3.

It is the smallest number to be one away from being divisible by so many numbers. It is one more than 40 which has factors 2, 4, 5, 8, 10, 20, and 40 and one less than 42 which has factors 2, 3, 6, 7, 14, 21, and 42. Altogether, that’s 13 numbers that 41 is nearly divisible by: 2, 3, 4, 5, 6, 7, 8, 10, 14, 20, 21, 40, and 42.

== In other fields ==
- In Mexico "cuarenta y uno" (41) is slang referring to a homosexual. This is due to the 1901 arrest of 41 homosexuals at a hotel in Mexico City during the government of Porfirio Díaz (1876–1911). See: Dance of the Forty-One.
