= 47 (number) =

| ← 46 | 47 | 48 → |
- ← 40 41 42 43 44 45 46 47 48 49 →: List of numbers; Integers; ← 0 10 20 30 40 50 60 70 80 90 →
- Cardinal: forty-seven
- Ordinal: 47th (forty-seventh)
- Numeral system: heptaquadragesimal
- Factorization: prime
- Prime: 15th
- Divisors: 1, 47
- Greek numeral: ΜΖ´
- Roman numeral: XLVII, xlvii
- Binary: 101111_{2}
- Ternary: 1202_{3}
- Senary: 115_{6}
- Octal: 57_{8}
- Duodecimal: 3B_{12}
- Hexadecimal: 2F_{16}

47 (forty-seven) is the natural number following 46 and preceding 48. It is a prime number.

It is the adopted favorite number of Pomona College, a liberal arts college in Southern California, whose alumni have added cultural references to it in numerous places, including many Star Trek episodes.

== Mathematics ==
47 is a safe prime, a Thabit prime, a regular prime, a cluster prime, an isolated prime, a Ramanujan prime, and a Higgs prime.

47 is also a supersingular prime. It is the last consecutive prime number that divides the order of at least one sporadic group.

== In popular culture ==
=== Pomona College ===
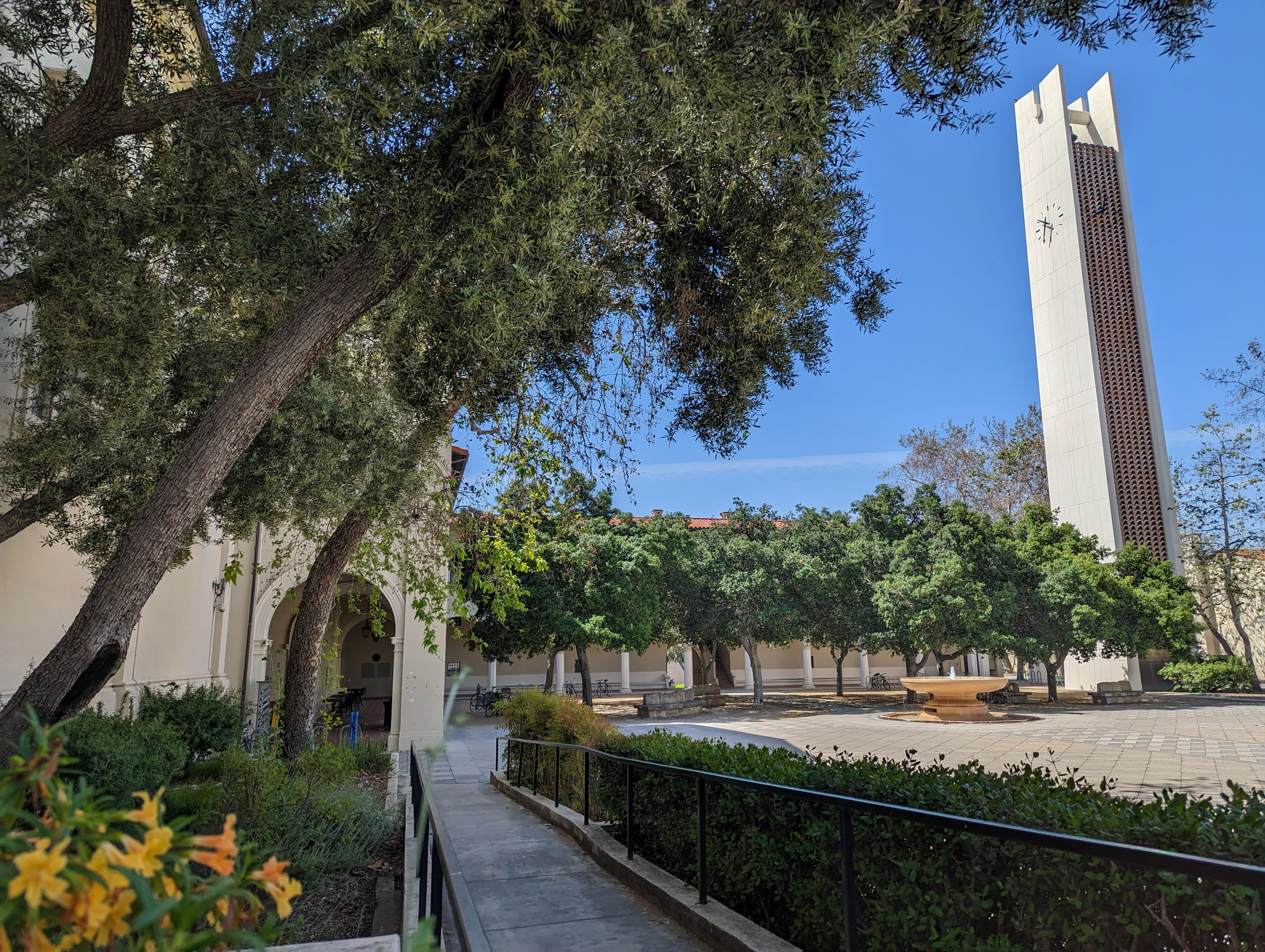
The Smith Clock Tower (right) at Pomona College has been set up to chime on the 47th minute of the hour.

The number 47 has historical implications to Pomona College, a liberal arts college in Claremont, California, and has been incorporated into various aspects of campus life. The tradition began in the summer of 1964, when two students, Laurie Mets and Bruce Elgin, conducted a research project seeking to find out whether the number occurs more often in nature than would be expected by chance. They documented various 47 sightings, and professor Donald Bentley produced a false mathematical proof that 47 was equal to all other integers. The number became a meme among the class, which spread once the academic year began and snowballed over time.

Notable 47 sightings include the fact that Pomona is located off of exit 47 of Interstate 10, and the fact that the largest residential building on campus, Mudd-Blaisdell (formally Florence Carrier Blaisdell and Della Mullock Mudd Hall, a title with 47 characters), was completed in 1947 and contains a staircase with 47 balusters.

Many Pomona alumni have deliberately inserted references to 47 into their work. Joe Menosky (class of 1979), a writer for Star Trek: The Next Generation, inserted mentions of 47 into nearly every episode he wrote, a practice that has been picked up by other Star Trek writers. Pomona hosts a community service–oriented celebration every April 7 (abbreviated 4/7 in the U.S.). In the early 2010s, the college's clock tower was set up to chime on the 47th minute of the hour.

=== Other ===
Late rapper Capital Steez was infatuated with the number 47 and what it meant spiritually. He believed the number 47 was the "perfect expression of balance in the world", representing the tension between the heart and the brain (the fourth and seventh chakras, respectively.) The number featured on the cover of AmeriKKKan Korruption, stylized to resemble a swastika.
