= 66 (number) =

← 65	66	67 →
- ← 60 61 62 63 64 65 66 67 68 69 →: List of numbers; Integers; ← 0 10 20 30 40 50 60 70 80 90 →
- Cardinal: sixty-six
- Ordinal: 66th (sixty-sixth)
- Factorization: 2 × 3 × 11
- Divisors: 1, 2, 3, 6, 11, 22, 33, 66
- Greek numeral: ΞϚ´
- Roman numeral: LXVI, lxvi
- Binary: 1000010_{2}
- Ternary: 2110_{3}
- Senary: 150_{6}
- Octal: 102_{8}
- Duodecimal: 56_{12}
- Hexadecimal: 42_{16}

66 (sixty-six) is the natural number following 65 and preceding 67.

== In mathematics ==
66 is a sphenic number, a semiperfect number, and a Erdős–Woods number. It is also the 11th triangular number and the 6th hexagonal number, as well as being a repdigit.

The number 66 is able to be expressed as the sum of triangular numbers in a variety of ways. For example:

- 21 + 45 = 66
- 6 + 15 + 45 = 66
- 3 + 6 + 21 + 36 = 66
- 1 + 6 + 10 + 21 + 28 = 66
- 1 + 3 + 6 + 10 + 10 + 15 + 21 = 66

== See also ==
- 66 (disambiguation)
