= 46 (number) =

| ← 45 | 46 | 47 → |
- ← 40 41 42 43 44 45 46 47 48 49 →: List of numbers; Integers; ← 0 10 20 30 40 50 60 70 80 90 →
- Cardinal: forty-six
- Ordinal: 46th (forty-sixth)
- Factorization: 2 × 23
- Divisors: 1, 2, 23, 46
- Greek numeral: ΜϚ´
- Roman numeral: XLVI, xlvi
- Binary: 101110_{2}
- Ternary: 1201_{3}
- Senary: 114_{6}
- Octal: 56_{8}
- Duodecimal: 3A_{12}
- Hexadecimal: 2E_{16}

46 (forty-six) is the natural number following 45 and preceding 47.

== In mathematics ==
46 is a composite number, a centered triangular number, and a Wedderburn-Etherington number, and an Erdős–Woods number.

== In sports ==
There are 46 mountains in the 46 peaks of the Adirondack mountain range. People who have climbed all of them are called "forty-sixers".

The number 46 is used to identify Valentino Rossi. The number is retired (no longer used) in the MotoGP after Rossi's retirement in 2022.

== In other fields ==
Flag of Oklahoma (1911–1925)

Because 46 in Japanese can be pronounced as "yon roku", and "yoroshiku" (よろしく) means "my best regards" in Japanese, people sometimes use 46 for greeting.

There are 46 chromosomes in a typical human somatic cell, arranged in 23 pairs.
