= Circular prime =

Type of prime number

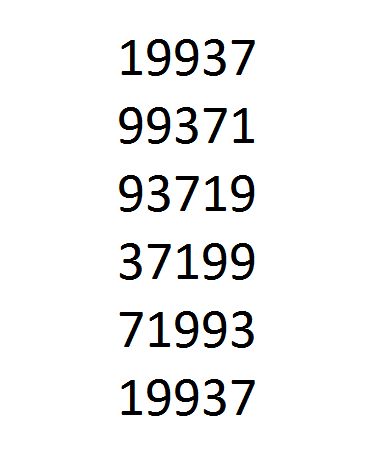
- The numbers generated by cyclically permuting the digits of 19937. The first digit is removed and readded at the right side of the remaining string of digits. This process is repeated until the starting number is reached again. Since all intermediate numbers generated by this process are prime, 19937 is a circular prime.
- Named after: Circle
- Publication year: 2004
- Author of publication: Darling, D. J.
- No. of known terms: 65
- First terms: 2, 3, 5, 7, 11, 13, 17, 31, 37, 71, 73, 79
- Largest known term: (10^{8177207}−1)/9
- OEIS index: A068652; Circular primes (numbers that remain prime under cyclic shifts of digits)

A circular prime is a prime number with the property that the number generated at each intermediate step when cyclically permuting its (base 10) digits will be prime. For example, 1193 is a circular prime, since 1931, 9311 and 3119 all are also prime.

A type of prime related to the circular primes are the permutable primes, which are a subset of the circular primes (every permutable prime is also a circular prime, but not necessarily vice versa).

== Known circular primes ==
The first few circular primes are

2, 3, 5, 7, 11, 13, 17, 31, 37, 71, 73, 79, 97, 113, 131, 197, 199, 311, 337, 373, 719, ... (sequence A068652 in the OEIS)

The smallest representatives in each cycle of circular primes are

2, 3, 5, 7, 11, 13, 17, 37, 79, 113, 197, 199, 337, 1193, 3779, 11939, 19937, 193939, 199933, R_{19}, R_{23}, ... (sequence A016114 in the OEIS)

where R_{n} := $\tfrac{10^n-1}{9}$ is a repunit, a number consisting only of n ones (in base 10). There are no other circular primes up to 10^{25}.

The only other known examples are repunit primes, which are circular primes by definition.

R_{2} (11), R_{19}, R_{23}, R_{317}, R_{1031}, R_{49081}, R_{86453}, R_{109297}, R_{270343}, R_{5794777}, R_{8177207}, ... (sequence A004023 in the OEIS)

It is conjectured that there are only finitely many non-repunit circular primes.

== Properties ==
A circular prime with at least two digits can only consist of combinations of the digits 1, 3, 7 or 9, because having 0, 2, 4, 6 or 8 as the last digit makes the number divisible by 2, and having 0 or 5 as the last digit makes it divisible by 5.

== Other bases ==
The complete listing of the smallest representative prime from all known cycles of circular primes in base 12 is (using A and B for ten and eleven, respectively)

2, 3, 5, 7, B, R_{2}, 15, 57, 5B, R_{3}, 117, 11B, 175, 1B7, 157B, 555B, R_{5}, 115B77, R_{17}, R_{81}, R_{91}, R_{225}, R_{255}, R_{4A5}, R_{5777}, R_{879B}, R_{198B1}, R_{23175}, and R_{311407}.

where R_{n} is a repunit prime in base 12 with n digits. There are no other circular primes in base 12 up to 12^{12}.

In base 2, only Mersenne primes can be circular primes, since any 0 permuted to the one's place results in an even number.
