= 9999 =

9999 may refer to:

- 9999 (number), a cardinal number which precedes 10000
- 9999, year in the far future
- 9999 (album), 2019 album by The Yellow Monkey
- 9999 Wiles, asteroid approximately 7 kilometers in diameter
- 9999, an Emergency telephone number in Oman
