= Gregory number =

In mathematics, a Gregory number, named after James Gregory, is a real number of the form:

$$G_x = \sum_{i = 0}^\infty (-1)^i \frac{1}{(2i + 1)x^{2i + 1}}$$

where x is any rational number greater or equal to 1. Considering the power series expansion for arctangent, we have

$$G_x = \arctan\frac{1}{x}.$$

Setting x = 1 gives the well-known Leibniz formula for pi. Thus, in particular,

$$\frac{\pi}{4}=\arctan 1$$

is a Gregory number.

== Properties ==
- $G_{-x}=-(G_x)$
- $\tan(G_x)= \frac{1}{x}$

== See also ==
- Størmer number
