= 45 (number) =

← 44	45	46 →
- ← 40 41 42 43 44 45 46 47 48 49 →: List of numbers; Integers; ← 0 10 20 30 40 50 60 70 80 90 →
- Cardinal: forty-five
- Ordinal: 45th (forty-fifth)
- Factorization: 3^{2} × 5
- Divisors: 1, 3, 5, 9, 15, 45
- Greek numeral: ΜΕ´
- Roman numeral: XLV, xlv
- Binary: 101101_{2}
- Ternary: 1200_{3}
- Senary: 113_{6}
- Octal: 55_{8}
- Duodecimal: 39_{12}
- Hexadecimal: 2D_{16}

45 (forty-five) is the natural number following 44 and preceding 46.

== In mathematics ==
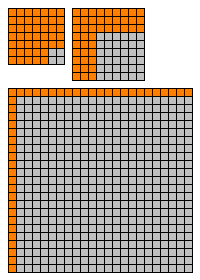
45 (in orange) as the difference of two nonzero squares in three different ways: 7²-2², 9²-6² and 23²-22².

45 is a composite number and a Størmer number.

Forty-five is conjectured to be the Ramsey number $R(5, 5)$.

$\phi(45)=\phi(\sigma(45))$

Forty-five degrees is half of a right angle (90°).

Forty-five is a triangular number: it is the sum of all single-digit decimal digits: $0+1+2+3+4+5+6+7+8+9=45$. It is, equivalently, the ninth triangle number. Forty-five is also the fourth hexagonal number and the second hexadecagonal number, or 16-gonal number.

== In music ==
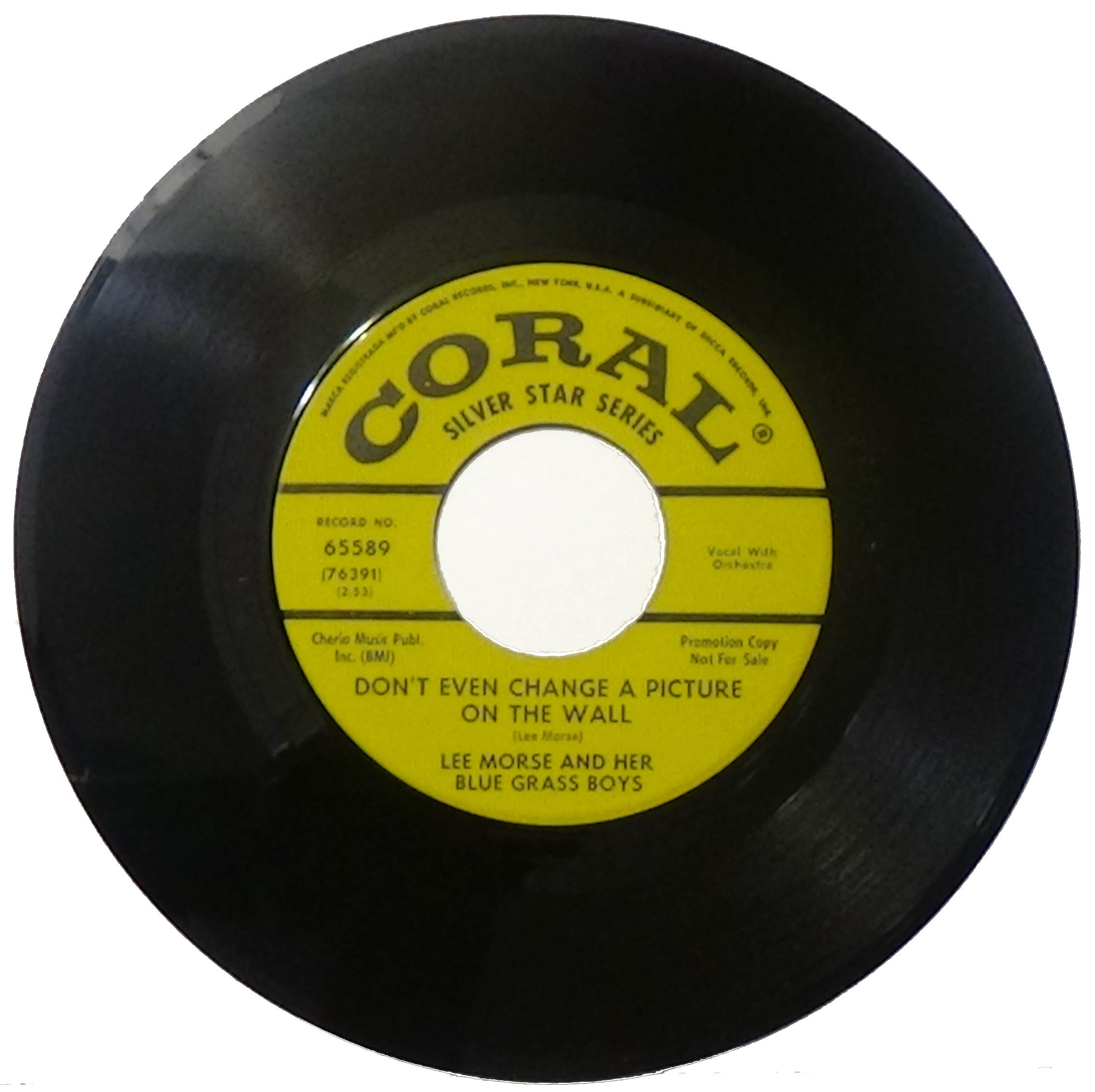
45 rpm gramophone record

A type of gramophone record classified by its rotational speed of 45 revolutions per minute (rpm)

== In other fields ==
45 years of marriage is marked by the sapphire wedding anniversary.

In the International Baccalaureate Diploma Programme, the number 45 is the maximum possible score.
