= Pillai prime =

Type of prime number

In number theory, a Pillai prime is a prime number p for which there is an integer n > 0 such that the factorial of n is one less than a multiple of the prime, but the prime is not one more than a multiple of n. To put it algebraically, $n! \equiv -1 \mod p$ but $p \not\equiv 1 \mod n$. The first few Pillai primes are

23, 29, 59, 61, 67, 71, 79, 83, 109, 137, 139, 149, 193, ... (sequence A063980 in the OEIS)

Pillai primes are named after the mathematician Subbayya Sivasankaranarayana Pillai, who studied these numbers. Their infinitude has been proven several times, by Subbarao, Erdős, and Hardy & Subbarao.
