= Newman–Shanks–Williams prime =

In mathematics, a Newman–Shanks–Williams prime (NSW prime) is a prime number which can be written in the form

$$S_{2m+1}=\frac{\left(1 + \sqrt{2}\right)^{2m+1} + \left(1 - \sqrt{2}\right)^{2m+1}}{2}$$.

NSW primes were first described by Morris Newman, Daniel Shanks and Hugh C. Williams in 1981 during their study of finite simple groups with square order.

The first few NSW primes are 7, 41, 239, 9369319, 63018038201, . . . (sequence A088165 in the OEIS), corresponding to the indices 3, 5, 7, 19, 29, . . . (sequence A005850 in the OEIS).

The sequence $S$ alluded to in the formula can be described by the following recurrence relation:

$$S_0=1 \,$$
$$S_1=1 \,$$
$$S_n=2S_{n-1}+S_{n-2}\qquad\text{for all }n\geq 2.$$

The first few terms of the sequence are 1, 1, 3, 7, 17, 41, 99, . . . (sequence A001333 in the OEIS). Each term in this sequence is half the corresponding term in the sequence of companion Pell numbers. These numbers also appear in the continued fraction convergents to √2.
