= 42 (number) =

← 41	42	43 →
- ← 40 41 42 43 44 45 46 47 48 49 →: List of numbers; Integers; ← 0 10 20 30 40 50 60 70 80 90 →
- Cardinal: forty-two
- Ordinal: 42nd (forty-second)
- Factorization: 2 × 3 × 7
- Divisors: 1, 2, 3, 6, 7, 14, 21, 42
- Greek numeral: ΜΒ´
- Roman numeral: XLII, xlii
- Binary: 101010_{2}
- Ternary: 1120_{3}
- Senary: 110_{6}
- Octal: 52_{8}
- Duodecimal: 36_{12}
- Hexadecimal: 2A_{16}

42 (forty-two) is the natural number following 41 and preceding 43.

== Mathematics ==
42 is a pronic number, an abundant number as well as a highly abundant number, a sphenic number, a practical number, and a Catalan number.

The 42-sided tetracontadigon is the largest such regular polygon that can only tile a vertex alongside other regular polygons, without tiling the plane.

42 is the magic constant of the smallest non-trivial magic cube, a $3 \times 3 \times 3$ cube with entries of 1 through 27, where every row, column, corridor, and diagonal passing through the center sums to forty-two.

42 can be expressed as the sum of three cubes: (80,435,758,145,817,515)^{3} + (12,602,123,297,335,631)^{3} + (-80,538,738,812,075,974)^{3} .

The 3×3×3 simple magic cube with rows summing to 42

== Wisdom literature, religion, and philosophy ==
In Abrahamic religions, 42 is the number with which God creates the Universe in Kabbalistic tradition. In Kabbalah, the most significant name is that of the En Sof (also known as "Ein Sof", "Infinite" or "Endless"), who is above the Sefirot (sometimes spelled "Sephirot"). The forty-two lettered name contains four combined names which are spelled in Hebrew letters. While there are obvious links between the forty-two lettered name of the Babylonian Talmud and the Kabbalah's 42 lettered name, they are probably not identical because of the Kabbalah's emphasis on numbers. The Kabbalah also contains a 45 lettered name and a 72 lettered name.

== Popular culture ==
=== The Hitchhiker's Guide to the Galaxy ===
The Answer to the Ultimate Question of Life, The Universe, and Everything

The number 42 is, in The Hitchhiker's Guide to the Galaxy by Douglas Adams, the "Answer to the Ultimate Question of Life, the Universe, and Everything", calculated by an enormous supercomputer named Deep Thought over a period of 7.5 million years. Unfortunately, no one knows what the question is. Thus, to calculate the Ultimate Question, a special computer the size of a small planet was built from organic components and named "Earth". The Ultimate Question "What do you get when you multiply six by nine" is found by Arthur Dent and Ford Prefect in the second book of the series, The Restaurant at the End of the Universe. This appeared first in the radio play and later in the novelization of The Hitchhiker's Guide to the Galaxy.

The fourth book in the series, the novel So Long, and Thanks for All the Fish, contains 42 chapters. According to the novel Mostly Harmless, 42 is the street address of Stavromula Beta.

In 1994, Adams created the 42 Puzzle, a game based on the number 42. Adams says he picked the number simply as a joke, with no deeper meaning.

Google also has a calculator easter egg when one searches "the answer to the ultimate question of life, the universe, and everything." Once typed (all in lowercase), the calculator answers with the number 42.

=== Jackie Robinson ===
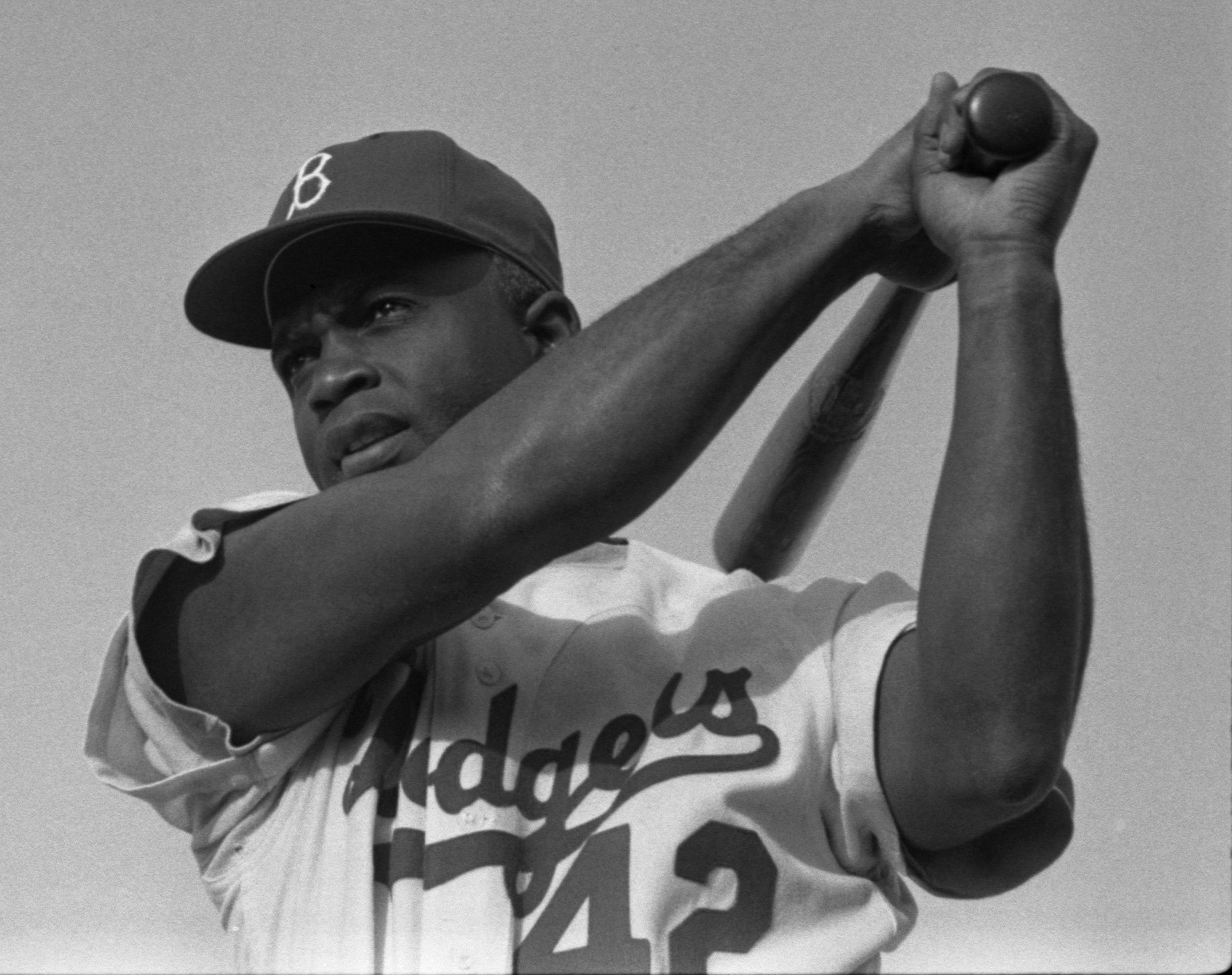
Jackie Robinson in his now-retired number 42 jersey

The jersey number of Jackie Robinson is the only number retired by all Major League Baseball teams. Although the number was retired in 1997, Mariano Rivera of the New York Yankees, the last professional baseball player to wear number 42, continued to wear it until he retired at the end of the 2013 season. As of the 2014 season, no player ever again wore the number 42 in Major League Baseball except on Jackie Robinson Day (April 15), when all uniformed personnel (players, managers, coaches, and umpires) wear the number.

=== Japan ===
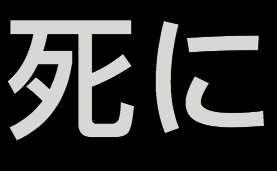
「死に」 (shini), which is the Japanese stem form of the verb 死ぬ (shinu), meaning “to die.”

In Japanese culture, the number 42 is considered unlucky because the numerals when pronounced separately—shi ni (four two)—sound like the word "dying", like the Latin word "mori".
