= 64 (number) =

← 63	64	65 →
- ← 60 61 62 63 64 65 66 67 68 69 →: List of numbers; Integers; ← 0 10 20 30 40 50 60 70 80 90 →
- Cardinal: sixty-four
- Ordinal: 64th (sixty-fourth)
- Factorization: 2^{6}
- Divisors: 1, 2, 4, 8, 16, 32, 64
- Greek numeral: ΞΔ´
- Roman numeral: LXIV, lxiv
- Binary: 1000000_{2}
- Ternary: 2101_{3}
- Senary: 144_{6}
- Octal: 100_{8}
- Duodecimal: 54_{12}
- Hexadecimal: 40_{16}

64 (sixty-four) is the natural number following 63 and preceding 65.

== Mathematics ==
64 is a power of two, an interprime, a superperfect number, an Erdős–Woods number, a square and a cube.

In four dimensions, there are 64 convex uniform polychora aside from two infinite families of duoprisms and antiprismatic prisms, and 64 Bravais lattices.

A chessboard has 64 squares.

== In other fields ==
64 is the atomic number of gadolinium.

== See also ==
- List of powers of two
- 64-bit computing
