= Royal Dutch Mathematical Society =

- Koninklijk Wiskundig Genootschap (translation: Royal Mathematical Society)
- Abbreviation: KWG
- Founded: 1778
- Type: Scientific society
- Location: Netherlands
- Field: Mathematics
- Chair: Barry Koren
- Website: https://www.wiskgenoot.nl/

The Royal Dutch Mathematical Society (Koninklijk Wiskundig Genootschap in Dutch, abbreviated as KWG) was founded in 1778. Its goal is to promote the development of mathematics, both from a theoretical and applied point of view.

The society publishes the quarterly journal Nieuw Archief voor Wiskunde, the magazine Pythagoras, wiskundetijdschrift voor jongeren for high school children, and the scientific journal Indagationes Mathematicae.

Each year the society organizes a winter symposium for high school teachers. Biannually Koninklijk Wiskundig Genootschap organizes the Dutch Mathematical Congress. Once every three years, the society awards the prestigious Brouwer Medal to a distinguished mathematician. This medal is named after L. E. J. Brouwer.

== Honorary members ==
Honorary members of the Koninklijk Wiskundig Genootschap
Date of award	Name
30-04-1938	I. M. Vinogradov
28-09-1957	Paul Erdős
28-09-1957	Kurt Mahler
28-09-1957	Alfred Tarski
25-04-1964	Mark Kac
21–05–1966	Pavel Alexandrov
21-05-1966	Dirk Jan Struik
1966	Johannes van der Corput
1966	Jan Arnoldus Schouten
1966	Willem van der Woude
29-03-1978	O. Bottema
29-03-1978	Harold Scott MacDonald Coxeter
29-03-1978	Bartel Leendert van der Waerden
29-03-1978	J.H. Wansink
10-04-1985	Hans Freudenthal
08-04-1988	Adriaan Cornelis Zaanen
08-04-1988	Nicolaas Govert de Bruijn
17-04-1998	Fred van der Blij
17-04-1998	Jacob Korevaar
17-04-1998	J.J. Seidel
16-04-2004	P.C. Baayen
16-04-2004	J. H. van Lint
16-04-2004	J.A.F. de Rijk (pseudonym "Bruno Ernst")
13-04-2007	J. van de Craats
13-04-2007	Dirk van Dalen
13-04-2007	F. Verhulst
05-04-2013	Robert Tijdeman
22-03-2016	Rien Kaashoek
22-03-2016	Henk van der Vorst
23-04-2019	Herman te Riele

== Institutional members ==
The society has the following institutional members:

- Centrum Wiskunde & Informatica
- Delft University of Technology
- Eindhoven University of Technology
- Leiden University
- Radboud University Nijmegen
- University of Amsterdam:
  - Institute for Logic, Language and Computation
  - Korteweg-de Vries Institute for Mathematics
- University of Groningen
- Utrecht University
- Vrije Universiteit Amsterdam
