= Harmonic prime =

A harmonic prime (sequence A092101 in the OEIS) is a prime number that divides the numerators of exactly three harmonic numbers.

Specifically, a harmonic prime p is always a factor of the numerators of the partial harmonic sums at positions p − 1, p^{2} − p, and p^{2} − 1.

For example, the numerators of the fractions given by $\sum_{i=1}^{4} \frac{1}{i}$, $\sum_{i=1}^{20} \frac{1}{i}$, and $\sum_{i=1}^{24} \frac{1}{i}$ are 25, 55835135, and 1347822955, each of which is divisible by 5.

All prime numbers greater than 5 can also be found at those three indices, but many also appear at other indices. It is conjectured that there are infinitely many harmonic primes.
