= Live at the Fillmore (The Residents album) =

Live album by the Residents
- Released: 1998
- Recorded: October 31, 1997

Live at the Fillmore is a limited release double CD recording of a live show by the Residents. To celebrate their 25th anniversary, the Residents performed a series of concerts during the last week of October 1997. The first part of the show featured mainly songs from their Gingerbread Man, Freak Show and Have a Bad Day albums, and the second half a performance of their live piece, "Disfigured Night". The recording on this release is from the October 31, 1997, performance.

Two releases were made by Ralph America. The original, in 1998, was a limited run of 1200 copies. It was re-released in 2005 in a second run of 1000 copies, with a note on the inside showing that it was a second pressing.

== Track listing ==
1. Jambalaya. Not at all.
2. 44
3. The Gingerbread Man
4. Part 1 - The Aging Musician
5. Part 2 - The Old Woman
6. Part 3 - The Sold-Out Artist
7. Everyone Comes to the Freak Show
8. Loss of Innocence
9. Jelly Jack (The Boneless Boy)
10. Lottie (The Human Log)
11. Ted
12. Benny (The Bouncing Bump)
13. Disfigured Night
  1. Introduction
  2. Disfigured Night 1
  3. Disfigured Night 2
  4. Disfigured Night 3
  5. Disfigured Night 4
  6. Disfigured Night 5
  7. Disfigured Night 6
  8. Disfigured Night 7 (We Are the World)
14. Hello Skinny
15. This Is a Man's Man's Man's World
16. Curtain Call
17. Good Night (Cruel World)
