= 63 (number) =

← 62	63	64 →
- ← 60 61 62 63 64 65 66 67 68 69 →: List of numbers; Integers; ← 0 10 20 30 40 50 60 70 80 90 →
- Cardinal: sixty-three
- Ordinal: 63rd (sixty-third)
- Factorization: 3^{2} × 7
- Divisors: 1, 3, 7, 9, 21, 63
- Greek numeral: ΞΓ´
- Roman numeral: LXIII, lxiii
- Binary: 111111_{2}
- Ternary: 2100_{3}
- Senary: 143_{6}
- Octal: 77_{8}
- Duodecimal: 53_{12}
- Hexadecimal: 3F_{16}

63 (sixty-three) is the natural number following 62 and preceding 64.

== Mathematics ==
63 is a composite number and a Woodall number and a Central Delannoy numbers.

Zsigmondy's theorem states that where $a>b>0$ are coprime integers for any integer $n \ge 1$, there exists a primitive prime divisor $p$ that divides $a^n-b^n$ and does not divide $a^k-b^k$ for any positive integer $k<n$, except for when

- $n=1$, $a-b=1; \;$ with $a^n-b^n=1$ having no prime divisors,
- $n=2$, $a+b \;$ a power of two, where any odd prime factors of $a^2-b^2=(a+b)(a^1-b^1)$ are contained in $a^1-b^1$, which is even;

and for a special case where $n=6$ with $a=2$ and $b=1$, which yields $a^6-b^6=2^6-1^6=63=3^2\times 7=(a^2-b^2)^2 (a^3-b^3)$.

In the integer positive definite quadratic matrix $\{1, 2, 3, 5, 6, 7, 10, 14, 15\}$ representative of all (even and odd) integers, the sum of all nine terms is equal to 63.

=== Finite simple groups ===
In the classification of finite simple groups of Lie type, 63 is an exponents that figures in the orders of three exceptional groups of Lie type. Lie algebra $E_{7}$ holds sixty-three positive root vectors in the seven-dimensional space.

There are 63 uniform polytopes in the sixth dimension that are generated from the abstract hypercubic $\mathrm {B_{6}}$ Coxeter group (sometimes, the demicube is also included in this family), that is associated with classical Chevalley Lie algebra $B_{6}$ via the orthogonal group and its corresponding special orthogonal Lie algebra (by symmetries shared between unordered and ordered Dynkin diagrams). There are also 36 uniform 6-polytopes that are generated from the $\mathrm {A_{6}}$ simplex Coxeter group, when counting self-dual configurations of the regular 6-simplex separately. In similar fashion, $\mathrm {A_{6}}$ is associated with classical Chevalley Lie algebra $A_{6}$ through the special linear group and its corresponding special linear Lie algebra.

In the third dimension, there are a total of sixty-three stellations generated with icosahedral symmetry $\mathrm {I_{h}}$, using Miller's rules.
