= Nieuw Archief voor Wiskunde =

- Discipline: Mathematics
- Language: Dutch

Publication details
- History: 1875-present
- Publisher: Centrum Wiskunde & Informatica (The Netherlands)
- Frequency: Quarterly

Standard abbreviations
- ISO 4: Nieuw Arch. Wiskd.

Indexing
- ISSN: 0028-9825
- LCCN: 88647611
- OCLC no.: 1313690209

Links
- Journal homepage; Online archive

The Nieuw Archief voor Wiskunde (English translated title: New Archive for Mathematics) is a quarterly Dutch peer-reviewed scientific journal of mathematics published by the Koninklijk Wiskundig Genootschap (Royal Mathematical Society) since 1875. The new version, the fifth series, started in 2000. The journal covers developments in mathematics in general and in Dutch mathematics in particular. It is abstracted and indexed in zbMATH Open.

== History ==
The previous version, with the full title Nieuw Archief voor Wiskunde uitgegeven door het Wiskundig Genootschap had four series between 1875 up to 1999: Eerste reeks (First Series, 1875-1893, 20 volumes), Tweede reeks (Second series, 1895-1949, 23 volumes), Derde reeks (Third series, 1953-1982, 30 volumes), and Vierde reeks (Fourth series, 1983-1999, 17 volumes). Initially, the publishing company was Weytingh & Brave in Amsterdam.

== Predecessor journal ==
In the years 1856-1874, the Wiskundig Genootschap (Mathematical Society) published three volumes of Archief, uitgegeven door het Wiskundig Genootschap with Weytingh & Brave in Amsterdam.
