= Three on a match =

Superstitious prohibition

Three on a match (also known as third on a match or unlucky third light) is a purported superstition among soldiers during the Crimean War to World War II. The superstition holds that if three soldiers light their cigarettes from the same match, the third person, or one of the three, will be shot. The belief subsequently broadened into a general taboo against three people sharing a single match, and has been referenced in Western popular culture, including films, novels, and other media.

== The putative basis of the superstition ==
The belief was that when the first soldier lit his cigarette, the enemy would see the light; when the second soldier lit his cigarette from the same match, the enemy would take aim at the target; and when the third soldier lit his cigarette from the match, the enemy would fire, and that soldier would be shot.

== Possible origins ==
=== Pre–First World War ===
A 1909 reference says about a French superstition: "[One who] lights three cigarettes with the same match is laying up trouble for himself".

=== First World War theory ===
References during World War I include: From 8 October 1916, "It is very unlucky to light three cigarettes on one match." From 4 January 1917, referencing soldiers in WW I: "Another man would rather waste a dry – and therefore valuable – match than light three cigarettes. An editorial in the Grand Rapids Leader, 17 December 1919, muses, "Why should we be superstitious? Three on a match, or a black cat crossing the road in front of us, or looking [at] the moon over the left shoulder, have not altered results in anyone's case." A cartoon two years later portrayed an insect attempting to climb on to a floating match already occupied by two beetles. The caption reads, "Get off of here! Don't you know that three on a match is unlucky?"

=== The "Ivar Kreuger" theory ===
The superstition is popularly alleged to have been invented in the mid- to late 1920s by the Swedish match tycoon Ivar Kreuger in an attempt to get people to use more matches, but it appears he merely made very shrewd use of the already existing belief, which—if it doesn't go back to the mid-19th-century Crimean War—may date to the turn of the 20th century and the Boer War.

=== Russian funeral rite theory ===
In the 1916 novel The Wonderful Year, the following explanation is given: "It arises out of the Russian funeral ritual in which the three altar candles are lit by the same taper. To apply the same method of illumination to three worldly things, like cigars or cigarettes, is regarded as an act of impiety and hence as unlucky."

=== Mexican superstition theory ===
An article by John G. Bourke, 5 January 1894, describes the superstition among the Mexican population of the Rio Grande region in the southern United States near Fort Ringgold, Texas: "Numbers—If three men light their cigarillos from the same match, bad luck will surely overtake one of them soon. (Alberto Leal.)"

== Usage in popular media ==
- First National Pictures released a film in 1932 called The Match King, starring Warren William; it was loosely based on the life of the Swedish match tycoon Ivar Kreuger and depicts the protagonist creating the "three on a match" superstition in order to sell more matches.
- The 1941 Hollywood film Dive Bomber includes a scene during the initial character introductions where Fred MacMurray quickly blows out the match when another pilot attempts to light a third cigarette, then takes a lighter out of his own pocket to finish the job.
- The 1945 Hollywood film Scarlet Street had this as a piece of foreshadowing in the opening scene. When two men light their cigars, Chris (Edward G. Robinson) is offered to light his as well, but hesitates. At that, his boss puts in the dig, "What's wrong? You aren't superstitious, are you, Chris?"
- The 1946 Hollywood film The Best Years of Our Lives makes reference to the superstition, as the three protagonists (Captain Fred Derry, Sergeant Al Stephenson and sailor Homer Parrish) are returning to their hometown in the nose of a B-17. After lighting Fred and Al's cigarettes with a match, Homer asks if anyone is superstitious, and although his compatriots reply that they aren't, Homer states that he is and uses another match to light his own cigarette. The scene's poignancy is heightened due to Homer having prosthetic devices in place of both his hands.
- The 1954 Popeye cartoon I Don't Scare refers to the superstition when Popeye lights 3 dynamite sticks in a dazed Bluto's mouth, saying with a chuckle "Three on a match is very bad luck!"
- Nas's song, "What Goes Around" from his album Stillmatic may reference the superstition in his extensive critique on the negativity prevalent in modern society, saying "You know, the usual, death comes in threes." It is far more likely that Nas is referring to the superstition that bad things (including deaths) come in threes.
- In Stephen King's 1986 novel It, during Eddie Kaspbrak's flashback scene in Chapter 7, the ten-eleven year old stuttering Bill Denbrough stopped his friend Richie Tozier from lighting a 3rd cigarette from the same match, saying, "The-The-Three on a muh-muh-hatch. B-Bad luh-luh-luck." King also referenced the superstition in his short story "The Ballad of the Flexible Bullet".
- In the movie "Three Strangers" there is a scene where Peter Lorre tries to light a Sydney Greenstreet cigarette and he pulls away. Lorre says "Oh, three on a match?"
- In the movie The Perks of Being a Wallflower Charlie, when stoned at a party, states that his friend Bob said "you can't have three on a match because they'd find us."

== See also ==
- Urban legend
