= Interprime =

Average of two consecutive odd primes

In mathematics, an interprime is a composite number that is the average of two consecutive primes. For example, 9 is an interprime because it is the average of 7 and 11. The first interprimes are:

4, 6, 9, 12, 15, 18, 21, 26, 30, 34, 39, 42, 45, 50, 56, 60, 64, 69, 72, 76, 81, 86, 93, 99, ... (sequence A024675 in the OEIS)

Interprimes cannot be prime themselves (otherwise the primes would not have been consecutive).

Since there are infinitely many primes, there are also infinitely many interprimes.

== See also ==
- Prime gap
- Twin primes
- Cousin prime
- Sexy prime
- Balanced prime – a prime number with equal-sized prime gaps above and below it
