= 48 (number) =

← 47	48	49 →
- ← 40 41 42 43 44 45 46 47 48 49 →: List of numbers; Integers; ← 0 10 20 30 40 50 60 70 80 90 →
- Cardinal: forty-eight
- Ordinal: 48th (forty-eighth)
- Factorization: 2^{4} × 3
- Divisors: 1, 2, 3, 4, 6, 8, 12, 16, 24, 48
- Greek numeral: ΜΗ´
- Roman numeral: XLVIII, xlviii
- Binary: 110000_{2}
- Ternary: 1210_{3}
- Senary: 120_{6}
- Octal: 60_{8}
- Duodecimal: 40_{12}
- Hexadecimal: 30_{16}

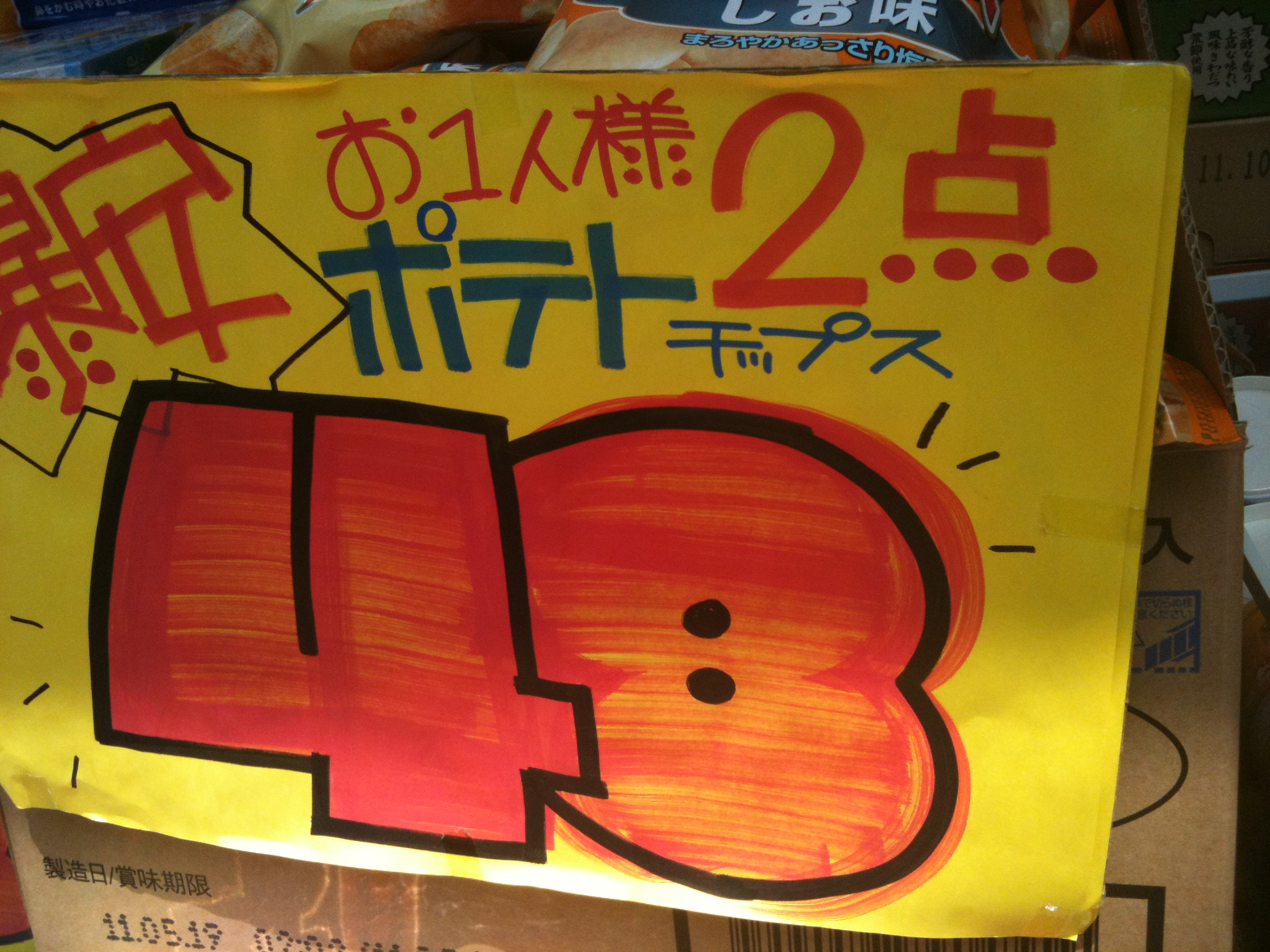
Graffiti of the number 48

48 (forty-eight) is the natural number following 47 and preceding 49. It is one third of a gross, or four dozen.

== In mathematics ==
48 is a highly composite number, and a Størmer number.

By a classical result of Honsberger, the number of incongruent integer-sided triangles of perimeter $m$ is given by the equations $\tfrac {m^2}{48}$ for even $m$, and $\tfrac{(m+3)^2}{48}$ for odd $m$.

48 is the order of full octahedral symmetry, which describes three-dimensional mirror symmetries associated with the regular octahedron and cube.

== In other fields ==
In Chinese numerology, 48 is an auspicious number meaning 'determined to prosper', or simply 'prosperity', which is good for business.

'48 is a slang term in Palestinian Arabic for parts of Israel or Palestine not under the control of the State of Palestine. Arab people from those parts are colloquially known as 48-Arabs (Arabic: عرب ٤٨, romanized: ‘Arab Thamāniya wa-Arba‘īn).
