= 69 (number) =

← 68	69	70 →
- ← 60 61 62 63 64 65 66 67 68 69 →: List of numbers; Integers; ← 0 10 20 30 40 50 60 70 80 90 →
- Cardinal: sixty-nine
- Ordinal: 69th (sixty-ninth)
- Factorization: 3 × 23
- Divisors: 1, 3, 23, 69
- Greek numeral: ΞΘ´
- Roman numeral: LXIX, lxix
- Binary: 1000101_{2}
- Ternary: 2120_{3}
- Senary: 153_{6}
- Octal: 105_{8}
- Duodecimal: 59_{12}
- Hexadecimal: 45_{16}
- Chinese numeral, Japanese numeral: 六十九
- ASCII value: E

69 (sixty-nine) is the natural number following 68 and preceding 70. An odd number and a composite number, 69 is divisible by 1, 3, 23, and 69.

The number and its pictograph give the name to the sexual position of the same name. The association of the number with this particular sex position has resulted in it being associated in meme culture also with sex.

== In mathematics ==
69 is a semiprime, or a natural number that is the product of exactly two prime numbers (3 and 23). It is an interprime, sitting between 67 and 71. 69 is not divisible by any square number other than 1, making it a square-free integer. 69 is a Blum integer since the two factors of 69 are both Gaussian primes, and an Ulam number, an integer that is the sum of two distinct previously occurring Ulam numbers in a sequence. (Note: As a consequence of the definition of the Ulam sequence, 3 is an Ulam number (1 + 2) and 4 is an Ulam number (1 + 3). 5 is not an Ulam number, because 5 = 1 + 4 = 2 + 3. 69 is an Ulam number as the sum of 16 + 53; both 16 and 53 are Ulam numbers.) 69 is a deficient number because the sum of its proper divisors (which excludes itself) is less than itself. As an integer for which the arithmetic mean average of its positive divisors is also an integer, 69 is an arithmetic number. 69 is a congruent number—a positive integer that is the area of a right triangle with three rational number sides—and an amenable number. 69 can be expressed as the sum of consecutive positive integers in multiple ways, making it a polite number. 69 is a lucky number because it is a natural number that remains after repeatedly removing every nth number in a sequence of natural numbers, starting from 1. (Note: Where n is the next number in the list after the last surviving number; every second number (all even numbers) in the list of numbers (1 through infinity) is eliminated first (1, 3, 5, 7, 9, 11 …), every third number (1, 3, 7, 9 …), then every seventh number, and so forth.)

In decimal, 69 is the only natural number whose square (4,761) and cube (328,509) use every digit from 0–9 exactly once. It is also the largest number whose factorial is less than a googol. On many handheld scientific and graphing calculators, 69! (1.711224524×10^{98}) is the highest factorial that can be calculated due to memory limitations. In its binary expansion of 1000101, 69 is equal to 105 octal, while 105 is equal to 69 hexadecimal (this same property can be applied to all numbers from 64 to 69). In computing, 69 equates to 2120 in ternary (base-3); 153 in senary (base-6); and 59 in duodecimal (base-12).

Visually, in Arabic numerals, 69 is a strobogrammatic number because it looks the same when viewed both right-side and upside down. 69 is a centered tetrahedral number, a figurate number that represents a pyramid with a triangular base and all other points arranged in layers above the base, forming a tetrahedron shape. 69 is also a pernicious number because there is a prime number of 1s when it is written as a binary number, and an odious number, as it is a positive integer that has an odd number of 1s in its binary expansion.

== In culture ==
69ing is a sex position wherein each partner aligns themselves to simultaneously achieve oral sex with each other. In reference to this sex act, the number 69 itself has become an Internet meme as an inherently funny number in which users will respond to any occurrence of the number with the word "nice" to draw specific attention to it. This means to humorously imply that the reference to the sex position was intentional. Because of its association with the sex position and resulting meme, 69 has been named "the sex number".

On American highways, "69 mile" marker signs are frequently stolen. As a result, the Colorado DOT began replacing them with "68.5 mile" ones.

== See also ==
- 6-7 – Internet meme
- 420 (cannabis culture) – another slang term that has also led to street sign theft
