= 70 (number) =

← 69	70	71 →
- ← 70 71 72 73 74 75 76 77 78 79 →: List of numbers; Integers; ← 0 10 20 30 40 50 60 70 80 90 →
- Cardinal: seventy
- Ordinal: 70th (seventieth)
- Factorization: 2 x 5 x 7
- Divisors: 1, 2, 5, 7, 10, 14, 35, 70
- Greek numeral: Ο´
- Roman numeral: LXX, lxx
- Binary: 1000110_{2}
- Ternary: 2121_{3}
- Senary: 154_{6}
- Octal: 106_{8}
- Duodecimal: 5A_{12}
- Hexadecimal: 46_{16}
- Hebrew: ע
- Lao: ໗
- [[Armenian numerals|Armenian]]: Հ
- Babylonian numeral: 𒐕𒌋
- Egyptian hieroglyph: 𓎌

70 (seventy) is the natural number following 69 and preceding 71.

== Mathematics ==
70 is a composite number, an Erdős–Woods number, a Pell number, a central binomial coefficient, a primitive abundant number, and the 7th pentagonal number. 70 is the smallest weird number, since it is a natural number that is abundant but not semiperfect.

70 is also part of the only nontrivial solution pair to the cannonball problem, along with 24.

== In religion ==
- In Jewish tradition, Ptolemy II Philadelphus ordered 72 Jewish elders to translate the Torah into Greek; the result was the Septuagint (from the Latin for "seventy"). The Roman numeral seventy, LXX, is the scholarly symbol for the Septuagint.
- In Islamic history and in Islamic interpretation the number 70 or 72 is most often and generally hyperbole for an infinite amount:
  - There are 70 dead among Muhammad's adversaries during the Battle of Badr.
  - 70 of Muhammad's followers are martyred at the Battle of Uhud.
  - In Shia Islam, there are 70 martyrs among Imam Hussein's followers during the Battle of Karbala.

== In other fields ==
- In some traditions, 70 years of marriage is marked by a platinum wedding anniversary.
- Under Social Security (United States), the age at which a person can receive the maximum retirement benefits (and may do so and continue working without reduction of benefits).

== Number name ==
Several languages, especially ones with vigesimal number systems, do not have a specific word for 70: for example, French: soixante-dix, lit. 'sixty-ten'; Danish: halvfjerds, short for halvfjerdsindstyve, 'three and a half score'. (For French, this is true only in France, Canada and Luxembourg; other French-speaking regions such as Belgium, Switzerland, Aosta Valley and Jersey use septante.)
