= 40 (number) =

Natural number, composite number

| ← 39 | 40 | 41 → |
- ← 40 41 42 43 44 45 46 47 48 49 →: List of numbers; Integers; ← 0 10 20 30 40 50 60 70 80 90 →
- Cardinal: forty
- Ordinal: 40th (fortieth)
- Numeral system: quadragesimal
- Factorization: 2^{3} × 5
- Divisors: 1, 2, 4, 5, 8, 10, 20, 40
- Greek numeral: Μ´
- Roman numeral: XL, xl
- Latin prefix: quadrage-
- Binary: 101000_{2}
- Ternary: 1111_{3}
- Senary: 104_{6}
- Octal: 50_{8}
- Duodecimal: 34_{12}
- Hexadecimal: 28_{16}
- Armenian: Խ
- Hebrew: מ / ם
- Babylonian numeral: 𒐏
- Egyptian hieroglyph: 𓎉

40 (forty) is the natural number following 39 and preceding 41.

Though the word is related to four (4), the spelling forty replaced fourty during the 17th century and is now the standard form.

== Mathematics ==
40 is an abundant number.

Swiss mathematician Leonhard Euler noted 40 prime numbers generated by the quadratic polynomial $n^{2} + n + 41$, with values $n = 0,1,2,...,39$. These forty prime numbers are the same prime numbers that are generated using the polynomial $n^{2} - n + 41$ with values of $n$ from 1 through 40, and are also known in this context as Euler's "lucky" numbers.

== In religion ==
The number 40 is found in many traditions without any universal explanation for its use. In Jewish, Christian, Islamic, and other Middle Eastern traditions it is invoked to convey a large, approximate number, similar to "umpteen".

=== Sumerian ===
Enki ( /ˈɛŋki/) or Enkil (Sumerian: dEN.KI(G)𒂗𒆠) is a god in Sumerian mythology, later known as Ea in Akkadian and Babylonian mythology. He was originally patron god of the city of Eridu, but later the influence of his cult spread throughout Mesopotamia and to the Canaanites, Hittites and Hurrians. Beginning around the second millennium BCE, he was sometimes referred to in writing by the numeric ideogram for "40", occasionally referred to as his "sacred number".

=== Judaism ===
- In the Hebrew Bible, forty is often used for time periods, forty days or forty years, which separate "two distinct epochs".
- Rain fell for "forty days and forty nights" during the Flood (Genesis 7:4).
- Noah waited for forty days after the tops of mountains were seen after the flood, before releasing a raven (Genesis 8:5–7).
- During the Exodus from Egypt, the Hebrew people lived in the lands outside of the Promised Land for "forty years". This period of years represents the time it takes for a new generation to arise (Numbers 32:13).
- Spies were sent by Moses to explore the land of Canaan (promised to the children of Israel) for "forty days" (Numbers 13:2, 25).
- Moses spent three consecutive periods of "forty days and forty nights" on Mount Sinai:
1. He went up on the seventh day of Sivan, after God gave the Torah to the Jewish people, in order to learn the Torah from God, and came down on the seventeenth day of Tammuz, when he saw the Jews worshiping the Golden Calf and broke the tablets (Exodus 24:18).
2. He went up on the eighteenth day of Tammuz to beg forgiveness for the people's sin and came down without God's atonement on the twenty-ninth day of Av (Exodus 34:28).
3. He went up on the first day of Elul and came down on the tenth day of Tishrei, the first Yom Kippur, with God's atonement (Deuteronomy 10:10).
- Several early Hebrew leaders and kings are said to have ruled for "forty years", that is, a generation. Examples include Eli (1 Samuel 4:18), Saul (Acts 13:21), David (2 Samuel 5:4), and Solomon (1 Kings 11:42).
- Goliath challenged the Israelites twice a day for forty days before David defeated him (1 Samuel 17:16).
- A mikvah consists of 40 se'ah (approximately 200 U.S. gallons or 760 liters) of water
- The prophet Elijah had to walk 40 days and 40 nights before arriving at mount Horeb (1 Kings 19:8).
- 40 lashes is one of the punishments meted out by the Sanhedrin (Deuteronomy 25:3), though in actual practice only 39 lashes were administered.
- (Numbers 14:33–34) alludes to the same with ties to the prophecy in The Book of Daniel. "For forty years—one year for each of the forty days you explored the land—you will suffer for your sins and know what it is like to have Me against you."
- One of the prerequisites for a man to study Kabbalah is that he is forty years old.
- "The registering of these men was carried on cruelly, zealously, assiduously, from the rising of the sun to its going down, and was not brought to an end in forty days" (3 Maccabees 4:15).
- Jonah warns Nineveh that "Forty days more, and Nineveh shall be overthrown." (Jonah 3:4)

=== Christianity ===
- Before starting his ministry, Jesus went to the wilderness and fasted for forty days and nights before being tempted by the devil (Matthew 4:1-2, Mark 1:13, Luke 4:1-2).
- Jesus showed himself alive for forty days after he suffered (Acts 1:3).

=== Islam ===
- Prophet Muhammad was forty years old when he first received the revelation delivered by the archangel Gabriel. The Quran states that a person reaches the age of maturity at 40.

=== Hinduism ===
In Hinduism, some popular religious prayers consist of forty shlokas or dohas (couplets, stanzas). The most common being the Hanuman Chalisa (chaalis is the Hindi term for 40).

In the Hindu system some of the popular fasting periods consist 40 days and is called the period One 'Mandala Kalam' Kalam means a period and Mandala Kalam means a period of 40 days. For example, the devotees (male and female) of Swami Ayyappa, the name of a Hindu god very popular in Kerala, India (Sabarimala Swami Ayyappan) strictly observed forty days fasting and visit (since female devotees of a certain biological age group would not be able to perform the continuous 40-day-austerities, they would not enter into the god's temple until September 2018) with their holy submission or offerings on 41st or a convenient day after a minimum 40 days practice of fasting. The offering is called "Kaanikka".

== In other fields ==
Forty is also:

- Kyrgyzstan is a country in Central Asia and is derived from the Kyrgyz word meaning "Land of forty tribes". The number 40 is significant in Kyrgyz traditions and appears in many areas of Kyrgyz culture.
- In Tamil literary tradition, 40 (nāṟpatu: நாற்பது) and 400 (nāṉūṟu: நானூறு) have a special significance. Many short works of the post-Sangam period have 40 poems. Some well-known works with 40 poems are naṉṉeṟi, iṉṉā nāṟpatu, kaḷavaḻi nāṟpatu, iṉiyavai nāṟpatu, kār nāṟpatu.
- The number of years of marriage celebrated by the ruby wedding anniversary
- Forty-shilling freeholders, a nickname, given to those who qualified for a franchise, the right to vote, based on their interest in land and/or property with an annual rental value of 40s. Introduced in England in 1430, it applied there and in many associated territories, in various forms, up to 1918.
- The international calling code for Romania.
- In Kazakh culture, the number 40 holds special significance and appears in life, rituals, and folk wisdom. It symbolizes maturity, experience, and the completion of a life stage. For example, the forty days after a person's death are considered an important period of remembrance, when relatives honor the memory of the deceased. Folk sayings also highlight its meaning: “Forty – age, forty – experience,” emphasizing accumulated life knowledge. The number 40 is also associated with purification and spiritual renewal in both religious and traditional ceremonies.
- The initial size of the gang of thieves in the story Ali Baba and the Forty Thieves.
