= 60 (number) =

← 59	60	61 →
- ← 60 61 62 63 64 65 66 67 68 69 →: List of numbers; Integers; ← 0 10 20 30 40 50 60 70 80 90 →
- Cardinal: sixty
- Ordinal: 60th (sixtieth)
- Numeral system: sexagesimal
- Factorization: 2^{2} × 3 × 5
- Divisors: 1, 2, 3, 4, 5, 6, 10, 12, 15, 20, 30, 60
- Greek numeral: Ξ´
- Roman numeral: LX, lx
- Binary: 111100_{2}
- Ternary: 2020_{3}
- Senary: 140_{6}
- Octal: 74_{8}
- Duodecimal: 50_{12}
- Hexadecimal: 3C_{16}
- Armenian: Կ
- Hebrew: ס
- Babylonian numeral: 𒐕
- Egyptian hieroglyph: 𓎋

60 (sixty;) is the natural number following 59 and preceding 61. Being three times 20, it is called threescore in older literature (kopa in Slavic, Schock in Germanic).

== In mathematics ==
60 is the 4th superior highly composite number, the 4th colossally abundant number, the 9th highly composite number, a unitary perfect number, and an abundant number.

The smallest group that is not solvable is the alternating group A_{5}, which has 60 elements. The group $A_5$ is also the rotational symmetry group of the regular icosahedron and of the regular dodecahedron.

There are 60 one-sided hexominoes, the polyominoes made from six squares.

== Cultural number systems ==
Babylonian cuneiform numerals

The Babylonian cuneiform numerals had a base of 60, inherited from the Sumerian and Akkadian civilizations, and possibly motivated by its large number of divisors. The sexagesimal measurement of time and of geometric angles is a legacy of the Babylonian system. For example, in time, there are 60 seconds in a minute, and 60 minutes in an hour. (a legacy of the Babylonian number system)

The number system in the Mali Empire was based on 60, reflected in the counting system of the Maasina Fulfulde, a variant of the Fula language spoken in contemporary Mali. The Ekagi of Western New Guinea used base 60, and the sexagenary cycle plays a role in Chinese calendar and numerology.

From Polish–Lithuanian Commonwealth in Slavic and Baltic languages 60 has its own name kopa (Polish: kopa, Belarusian: капа́, Lithuanian: kapa, Czech: kopa, Russian: копа, Ukrainian: копа́), in Germanic languages: German: Schock, Danish: skok, Dutch: schok, Swedish: Skock, Norwegian: Skokk and in Latin: sexagena refer to 60 = 5 dozen = 1/2 small gross. This quantity was used in international medieval treaties e.g. for ransom of captured Teutonic Knights.

== In science and technology ==
Buckminsterfullerene C_{60} has 60 carbon atoms in each molecule, arranged in a truncated icosahedron.

The first fullerene to be discovered was buckminsterfullerene C_{60}, an allotrope of carbon with 60 atoms in each molecule, arranged in a truncated icosahedron. This ball is known as a buckyball, and looks like a soccer ball.

The atomic number of neodymium is 60, and cobalt-60 (^{60}Co) is a radioactive isotope of cobalt.

The electrical utility frequency in western Japan, South Korea, Taiwan, the Philippines, the United States, and several other countries in the Americas is 60 Hz.

An exbibyte (sometimes called exabyte) is 2^{60} bytes.

== In religion ==
In Hinduism, the 60th birthday of a man is called Sashti poorthi. A ceremony called Sashti (60) Abda (years) Poorthi (completed) in Sanskrit is conducted to felicitate this birthday. It represents a milestone in his life. There are 60 years mentioned in the historic Indian calendars.

== In other fields ==
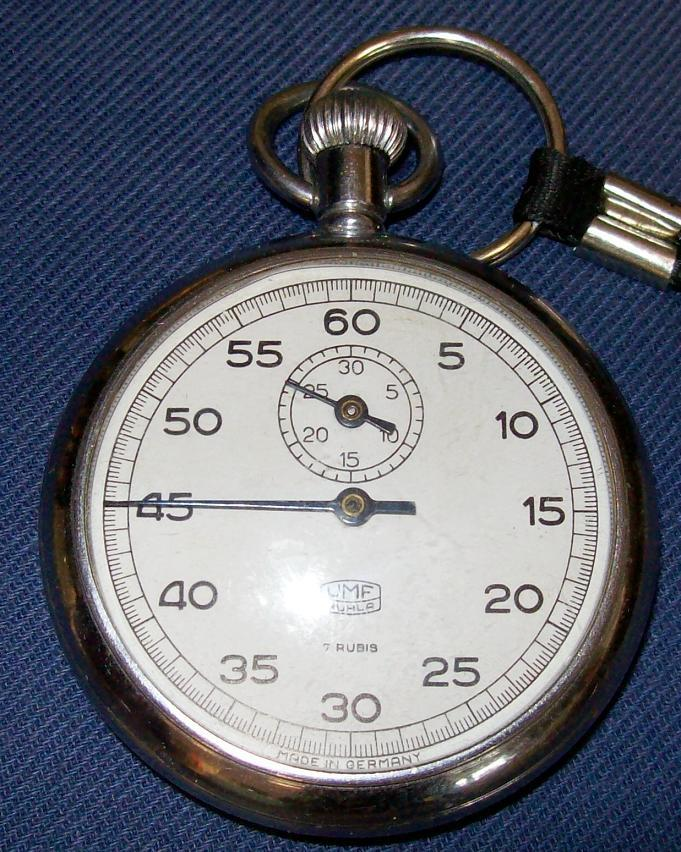
There are 60 seconds in a minute, and 60 minutes in an hour.

It is:

- The number of feet in the standard measurement tool to evaluate an automotive launch on a dragstrip, as the time taken to travel the first 60 feet (18 m) of the track.
- The number of miles per hour an automobile accelerates to from rest (0-60) as one of the standard measurements of performance
- The number of years in a sexagenary cycle
