= Table of prime factors =

The tables contain the prime factorization of the natural numbers from 1 to 1000.

When n is a prime number, the prime factorization is just n itself, written in bold below.

The number 1 is called a unit. It has no prime factors and is neither prime nor composite.

== Properties ==
Many properties of a natural number $n$ can be seen or directly computed from the prime factorization of $n$.

- The **multiplicity** of a prime factor $p$ of $n$ is the largest exponent $m$ for which $p^m$ divides $n$. The tables show the multiplicity for each prime factor. If no exponent is written then the multiplicity is $1$ (since $p = p^1$). The multiplicity of a prime which does not divide $n$ may be called $0$ or may be considered undefined.
- $\omega(n)$ and $\Omega(n)$, the prime omega functions, count the number of prime factors of a natural number $n$.
  - $\omega(n)$ (little omega) is the number of distinct prime factors of $n$.
  - $\Omega(n)$ (big omega) is the number of prime factors of $n$ counted with multiplicity (so it is the sum of all prime factor multiplicities).
- A prime number has $\Omega(n) = \omega(n) = 1$. The first: 2, 3, 5, 7, 11, 13, 17, 19, 23, 29, 31, 37 (sequence A000040 in the OEIS). There are many special types of prime numbers.
- A composite number has $\Omega(n) \ge \omega(n) > 1$. The first: 4, 6, 8, 9, 10, 12, 14, 15, 16, 18, 20, 21 (sequence A002808 in the OEIS). All numbers above 1 are either prime or composite. 1 is neither.
- A semiprime has $\Omega(n) = 2$ (so it is composite). The first: 4, 6, 9, 10, 14, 15, 21, 22, 25, 26, 33, 34 (sequence A001358 in the OEIS).
- A $k$-almost prime (for a natural number $k$) has $\Omega(n) = k$ (so it is composite if $k > 1$).
- An even number has the prime factor 2. The first: 2, 4, 6, 8, 10, 12, 14, 16, 18, 20, 22, 24 (sequence A005843 in the OEIS).
- An odd number does not have the prime factor 2. The first: 1, 3, 5, 7, 9, 11, 13, 15, 17, 19, 21, 23 (sequence A005408 in the OEIS). All integers are either even or odd.
- A square has even multiplicity for all prime factors (it is of the form $a^2$ for some $a$). The first: 1, 4, 9, 16, 25, 36, 49, 64, 81, 100, 121, 144 (sequence A000290 in the OEIS).
- A cube has all multiplicities divisible by 3 (it is of the form $a^3$ for some $a$). The first: 1, 8, 27, 64, 125, 216, 343, 512, 729, 1000, 1331, 1728 (sequence A000578 in the OEIS).
- A perfect power has a common divisor $m > 1$ for all multiplicities (it is of the form $a^m$ for some $a > 1$ and $m > 1$). The first: 4, 8, 9, 16, 25, 27, 32, 36, 49, 64, 81, 100 (sequence A001597 in the OEIS). 1 is sometimes included.
- A powerful number (also called **squarefull**) has multiplicity greater than 1 for all its prime factors. The first: 1, 4, 8, 9, 16, 25, 27, 32, 36, 49, 64, 72 (sequence A001694 in the OEIS).
- A prime power has only one prime factor, i.e. $\omega(n) = 1$. The first: 2, 3, 4, 5, 7, 8, 9, 11, 13, 16, 17, 19 (sequence A000961 in the OEIS). 1 is sometimes included.
- An Achilles number is powerful but not a perfect power. The first: 72, 108, 200, 288, 392, 432, 500, 648, 675, 800, 864, 968 (sequence A052486 in the OEIS).
- A square-free integer has no prime factor with multiplicity greater than 1. The first: 1, 2, 3, 5, 6, 7, 10, 11, 13, 14, 15, 17 (sequence A005117 in the OEIS). A number where some but not all prime factors have multiplicity greater than 1 is neither square-free nor squarefull, but squareful.
- The Liouville function $\lambda(n)$ is 1 if $\Omega(n)$ is even, and is -1 if $\Omega(n)$ is odd.
- The Möbius function $\mu(n)$ is 0 if $n$ is not square-free. Otherwise $\mu(n)$ is 1 if $\Omega(n)$ is even, and is −1 if $\Omega(n)$ is odd.
- A sphenic number is square-free and the product of 3 distinct primes, i.e. it has $\omega(n) = \Omega(n) = 3$. The first: 30, 42, 66, 70, 78, 102, 105, 110, 114, 130, 138, 154 (sequence A007304 in the OEIS).
- $a_0(n)$, sometimes called the integer logarithm, is the sum of primes dividing $n$, counted with multiplicity. It is an additive function.
- A Ruth-Aaron pair is a pair of two consecutive numbers $(n, n+1)$ with $a_0(n) = a_0(n+1)$. The first (by $n$ value): 5, 8, 15, 77, 125, 714, 948, 1330, 1520, 1862, 2491, 3248 (sequence A039752 in the OEIS). Another definition is where the same prime is only counted once; if so, the first (by $n$ value): 5, 24, 49, 77, 104, 153, 369, 492, 714, 1682, 2107, 2299 (sequence A006145 in the OEIS).
- A primorial $p_n\#$ is the product of all primes from 2 to $p_n$. The first: 2, 6, 30, 210, 2310, 30030, 510510, 9699690, 223092870, 6469693230, 200560490130, 7420738134810 (sequence A002110 in the OEIS). $1\# = 1$ is sometimes included.
- A factorial $n!$ is the product of all numbers from 1 to $n$. The first: 1, 2, 6, 24, 120, 720, 5040, 40320, 362880, 3628800, 39916800, 479001600 (sequence A000142 in the OEIS). $0! = 1$ is sometimes included.
- A $k$-smooth number (for a natural number $k$) has its prime factors $\le k$ (so it is also $j$-smooth for any $j > k$).
- $m$ is **smoother** than $n$ if the largest prime factor of $m$ is less than the largest of $n$.
- A regular number has no prime factor greater than 5 (so it is 5-smooth). The first: 1, 2, 3, 4, 5, 6, 8, 9, 10, 12, 15, 16 (sequence A051037 in the OEIS).
- A $k$-powersmooth number has all $p^m \le k$ where $p$ is a prime factor with multiplicity $m$.
- A frugal number has more digits than the number of digits in its prime factorization (when written like the tables below with multiplicities above 1 as exponents). The first in decimal: 125, 128, 243, 256, 343, 512, 625, 729, 1024, 1029, 1215, 1250 (sequence A046759 in the OEIS).
- An equidigital number has the same number of digits as its prime factorization. The first in decimal: 1, 2, 3, 5, 7, 10, 11, 13, 14, 15, 16, 17 (sequence A046758 in the OEIS).
- An extravagant number has fewer digits than its prime factorization. The first in decimal: 4, 6, 8, 9, 12, 18, 20, 22, 24, 26, 28, 30 (sequence A046760 in the OEIS).
- An **economical number** has been defined as a frugal number, but also as a number that is either frugal or equidigital.
- $gcd(m, n)$ (greatest common divisor of $m$ and $n$) is the product of all prime factors which are both in $m$ and $n$ (with the smallest multiplicity for $m$ and $n$).
- $m$ and $n$ are coprime (also called relatively prime) if they have no common prime factors, which implies $gcd(m, n) = 1$.
- $lcm(m, n)$ (least common multiple of $m$ and $n$) is the product of all prime factors of $m$ or $n$ (with the largest multiplicity for $m$ or $n$).
- $gcd(m, n) \times lcm(m, n) = m \times n$. Finding the prime factors is often harder than computing $gcd$ and $lcm$ using other algorithms which do not require known prime factorization.
- $m$ is a divisor of $n$ (also called $m$ divides $n$, or $n$ is divisible by $m$) if all prime factors of $m$ have at least the same multiplicity in $n$.
- The divisors of $n$ are all products of some or all prime factors of $n$ (including the empty product 1 of no prime factors). The number of divisors can be computed by increasing all multiplicities by 1 and then multiplying them.

Divisors and properties related to divisors are shown in table of divisors.

== 1 to 100 ==
1–20
1	
2	**2**
3	**3**
4	2^{2}
5	**5**
6	2·3
7	**7**
8	2^{3}
9	3^{2}
10	2·5
11	**11**
12	2^{2}·3
13	**13**
14	2·7
15	3·5
16	2^{4}
17	**17**
18	2·3^{2}
19	**19**
20	2^{2}·5

21–40
21	3·7
22	2·11
23	**23**
24	2^{3}·3
25	5^{2}
26	2·13
27	3^{3}
28	2^{2}·7
29	**29**
30	2·3·5
31	**31**
32	2^{5}
33	3·11
34	2·17
35	5·7
36	2^{2}·3^{2}
37	**37**
38	2·19
39	3·13
40	2^{3}·5

41–60
41	**41**
42	2·3·7
43	**43**
44	2^{2}·11
45	3^{2}·5
46	2·23
47	**47**
48	2^{4}·3
49	7^{2}
50	2·5^{2}
51	3·17
52	2^{2}·13
53	**53**
54	2·3^{3}
55	5·11
56	2^{3}·7
57	3·19
58	2·29
59	**59**
60	2^{2}·3·5

61–80
61	**61**
62	2·31
63	3^{2}·7
64	2^{6}
65	5·13
66	2·3·11
67	**67**
68	2^{2}·17
69	3·23
70	2·5·7
71	**71**
72	2^{3}·3^{2}
73	**73**
74	2·37
75	3·5^{2}
76	2^{2}·19
77	7·11
78	2·3·13
79	**79**
80	2^{4}·5

81–100
81	3^{4}
82	2·41
83	**83**
84	2^{2}·3·7
85	5·17
86	2·43
87	3·29
88	2^{3}·11
89	**89**
90	2·3^{2}·5
91	7·13
92	2^{2}·23
93	3·31
94	2·47
95	5·19
96	2^{5}·3
97	**97**
98	2·7^{2}
99	3^{2}·11
100	2^{2}·5^{2}

== 101 to 200 ==
101–120
101	**101**
102	2·3·17
103	**103**
104	2^{3}·13
105	3·5·7
106	2·53
107	**107**
108	2^{2}·3^{3}
109	**109**
110	2·5·11
111	3·37
112	2^{4}·7
113	**113**
114	2·3·19
115	5·23
116	2^{2}·29
117	3^{2}·13
118	2·59
119	7·17
120	2^{3}·3·5

121–140
121	11^{2}
122	2·61
123	3·41
124	2^{2}·31
125	5^{3}
126	2·3^{2}·7
127	**127**
128	2^{7}
129	3·43
130	2·5·13
131	**131**
132	2^{2}·3·11
133	7·19
134	2·67
135	3^{3}·5
136	2^{3}·17
137	**137**
138	2·3·23
139	**139**
140	2^{2}·5·7

141–160
141	3·47
142	2·71
143	11·13
144	2^{4}·3^{2}
145	5·29
146	2·73
147	3·7^{2}
148	2^{2}·37
149	**149**
150	2·3·5^{2}
151	**151**
152	2^{3}·19
153	3^{2}·17
154	2·7·11
155	5·31
156	2^{2}·3·13
157	**157**
158	2·79
159	3·53
160	2^{5}·5

161–180
161	7·23
162	2·3^{4}
163	**163**
164	2^{2}·41
165	3·5·11
166	2·83
167	**167**
168	2^{3}·3·7
169	13^{2}
170	2·5·17
171	3^{2}·19
172	2^{2}·43
173	**173**
174	2·3·29
175	5^{2}·7
176	2^{4}·11
177	3·59
178	2·89
179	**179**
180	2^{2}·3^{2}·5

181–200
181	**181**
182	2·7·13
183	3·61
184	2^{3}·23
185	5·37
186	2·3·31
187	11·17
188	2^{2}·47
189	3^{3}·7
190	2·5·19
191	**191**
192	2^{6}·3
193	**193**
194	2·97
195	3·5·13
196	2^{2}·7^{2}
197	**197**
198	2·3^{2}·11
199	**199**
200	2^{3}·5^{2}

== 201 to 300 ==
201–220
201	3·67
202	2·101
203	7·29
204	2^{2}·3·17
205	5·41
206	2·103
207	3^{2}·23
208	2^{4}·13
209	11·19
210	2·3·5·7
211	**211**
212	2^{2}·53
213	3·71
214	2·107
215	5·43
216	2^{3}·3^{3}
217	7·31
218	2·109
219	3·73
220	2^{2}·5·11

221–240
221	13·17
222	2·3·37
223	**223**
224	2^{5}·7
225	3^{2}·5^{2}
226	2·113
227	**227**
228	2^{2}·3·19
229	**229**
230	2·5·23
231	3·7·11
232	2^{3}·29
233	**233**
234	2·3^{2}·13
235	5·47
236	2^{2}·59
237	3·79
238	2·7·17
239	**239**
240	2^{4}·3·5

241–260
241	**241**
242	2·11^{2}
243	3^{5}
244	2^{2}·61
245	5·7^{2}
246	2·3·41
247	13·19
248	2^{3}·31
249	3·83
250	2·5^{3}
251	**251**
252	2^{2}·3^{2}·7
253	11·23
254	2·127
255	3·5·17
256	2^{8}
257	**257**
258	2·3·43
259	7·37
260	2^{2}·5·13

261–280
261	3^{2}·29
262	2·131
263	**263**
264	2^{3}·3·11
265	5·53
266	2·7·19
267	3·89
268	2^{2}·67
269	**269**
270	2·3^{3}·5
271	**271**
272	2^{4}·17
273	3·7·13
274	2·137
275	5^{2}·11
276	2^{2}·3·23
277	**277**
278	2·139
279	3^{2}·31
280	2^{3}·5·7

281–300
281	**281**
282	2·3·47
283	**283**
284	2^{2}·71
285	3·5·19
286	2·11·13
287	7·41
288	2^{5}·3^{2}
289	17^{2}
290	2·5·29
291	3·97
292	2^{2}·73
293	**293**
294	2·3·7^{2}
295	5·59
296	2^{3}·37
297	3^{3}·11
298	2·149
299	13·23
300	2^{2}·3·5^{2}

== 301 to 400 ==
301–320
301	7·43
302	2·151
303	3·101
304	2^{4}·19
305	5·61
306	2·3^{2}·17
307	**307**
308	2^{2}·7·11
309	3·103
310	2·5·31
311	**311**
312	2^{3}·3·13
313	**313**
314	2·157
315	3^{2}·5·7
316	2^{2}·79
317	**317**
318	2·3·53
319	11·29
320	2^{6}·5

321–340
321	3·107
322	2·7·23
323	17·19
324	2^{2}·3^{4}
325	5^{2}·13
326	2·163
327	3·109
328	2^{3}·41
329	7·47
330	2·3·5·11
331	**331**
332	2^{2}·83
333	3^{2}·37
334	2·167
335	5·67
336	2^{4}·3·7
337	**337**
338	2·13^{2}
339	3·113
340	2^{2}·5·17

341–360
341	11·31
342	2·3^{2}·19
343	7^{3}
344	2^{3}·43
345	3·5·23
346	2·173
347	**347**
348	2^{2}·3·29
349	**349**
350	2·5^{2}·7
351	3^{3}·13
352	2^{5}·11
353	**353**
354	2·3·59
355	5·71
356	2^{2}·89
357	3·7·17
358	2·179
359	**359**
360	2^{3}·3^{2}·5

361–380
361	19^{2}
362	2·181
363	3·11^{2}
364	2^{2}·7·13
365	5·73
366	2·3·61
367	**367**
368	2^{4}·23
369	3^{2}·41
370	2·5·37
371	7·53
372	2^{2}·3·31
373	**373**
374	2·11·17
375	3·5^{3}
376	2^{3}·47
377	13·29
378	2·3^{3}·7
379	**379**
380	2^{2}·5·19

381–400
381	3·127
382	2·191
383	**383**
384	2^{7}·3
385	5·7·11
386	2·193
387	3^{2}·43
388	2^{2}·97
389	**389**
390	2·3·5·13
391	17·23
392	2^{3}·7^{2}
393	3·131
394	2·197
395	5·79
396	2^{2}·3^{2}·11
397	**397**
398	2·199
399	3·7·19
400	2^{4}·5^{2}

== 401 to 500 ==
401–420
401	**401**
402	2·3·67
403	13·31
404	2^{2}·101
405	3^{4}·5
406	2·7·29
407	11·37
408	2^{3}·3·17
409	**409**
410	2·5·41
411	3·137
412	2^{2}·103
413	7·59
414	2·3^{2}·23
415	5·83
416	2^{5}·13
417	3·139
418	2·11·19
419	**419**
420	2^{2}·3·5·7

421–440
421	**421**
422	2·211
423	3^{2}·47
424	2^{3}·53
425	5^{2}·17
426	2·3·71
427	7·61
428	2^{2}·107
429	3·11·13
430	2·5·43
431	**431**
432	2^{4}·3^{3}
433	**433**
434	2·7·31
435	3·5·29
436	2^{2}·109
437	19·23
438	2·3·73
439	**439**
440	2^{3}·5·11

441–460
441	3^{2}·7^{2}
442	2·13·17
443	**443**
444	2^{2}·3·37
445	5·89
446	2·223
447	3·149
448	2^{6}·7
449	**449**
450	2·3^{2}·5^{2}
451	11·41
452	2^{2}·113
453	3·151
454	2·227
455	5·7·13
456	2^{3}·3·19
457	**457**
458	2·229
459	3^{3}·17
460	2^{2}·5·23

461–480
461	**461**
462	2·3·7·11
463	**463**
464	2^{4}·29
465	3·5·31
466	2·233
467	**467**
468	2^{2}·3^{2}·13
469	7·67
470	2·5·47
471	3·157
472	2^{3}·59
473	11·43
474	2·3·79
475	5^{2}·19
476	2^{2}·7·17
477	3^{2}·53
478	2·239
479	**479**
480	2^{5}·3·5

481–500
481	13·37
482	2·241
483	3·7·23
484	2^{2}·11^{2}
485	5·97
486	2·3^{5}
487	**487**
488	2^{3}·61
489	3·163
490	2·5·7^{2}
491	**491**
492	2^{2}·3·41
493	17·29
494	2·13·19
495	3^{2}·5·11
496	2^{4}·31
497	7·71
498	2·3·83
499	**499**
500	2^{2}·5^{3}

== 501 to 600 ==
501–520
501	3·167
502	2·251
503	**503**
504	2^{3}·3^{2}·7
505	5·101
506	2·11·23
507	3·13^{2}
508	2^{2}·127
509	**509**
510	2·3·5·17
511	7·73
512	2^{9}
513	3^{3}·19
514	2·257
515	5·103
516	2^{2}·3·43
517	11·47
518	2·7·37
519	3·173
520	2^{3}·5·13

521–540
521	**521**
522	2·3^{2}·29
523	**523**
524	2^{2}·131
525	3·5^{2}·7
526	2·263
527	17·31
528	2^{4}·3·11
529	23^{2}
530	2·5·53
531	3^{2}·59
532	2^{2}·7·19
533	13·41
534	2·3·89
535	5·107
536	2^{3}·67
537	3·179
538	2·269
539	7^{2}·11
540	2^{2}·3^{3}·5

541–560
541	**541**
542	2·271
543	3·181
544	2^{5}·17
545	5·109
546	2·3·7·13
547	**547**
548	2^{2}·137
549	3^{2}·61
550	2·5^{2}·11
551	19·29
552	2^{3}·3·23
553	7·79
554	2·277
555	3·5·37
556	2^{2}·139
557	**557**
558	2·3^{2}·31
559	13·43
560	2^{4}·5·7

561–580
561	3·11·17
562	2·281
563	**563**
564	2^{2}·3·47
565	5·113
566	2·283
567	3^{4}·7
568	2^{3}·71
569	**569**
570	2·3·5·19
571	**571**
572	2^{2}·11·13
573	3·191
574	2·7·41
575	5^{2}·23
576	2^{6}·3^{2}
577	**577**
578	2·17^{2}
579	3·193
580	2^{2}·5·29

581–600
581	7·83
582	2·3·97
583	11·53
584	2^{3}·73
585	3^{2}·5·13
586	2·293
587	**587**
588	2^{2}·3·7^{2}
589	19·31
590	2·5·59
591	3·197
592	2^{4}·37
593	**593**
594	2·3^{3}·11
595	5·7·17
596	2^{2}·149
597	3·199
598	2·13·23
599	**599**
600	2^{3}·3·5^{2}

== 601 to 700 ==
601–620
601	**601**
602	2·7·43
603	3^{2}·67
604	2^{2}·151
605	5·11^{2}
606	2·3·101
607	**607**
608	2^{5}·19
609	3·7·29
610	2·5·61
611	13·47
612	2^{2}·3^{2}·17
613	**613**
614	2·307
615	3·5·41
616	2^{3}·7·11
617	**617**
618	2·3·103
619	**619**
620	2^{2}·5·31

621–640
621	3^{3}·23
622	2·311
623	7·89
624	2^{4}·3·13
625	5^{4}
626	2·313
627	3·11·19
628	2^{2}·157
629	17·37
630	2·3^{2}·5·7
631	**631**
632	2^{3}·79
633	3·211
634	2·317
635	5·127
636	2^{2}·3·53
637	7^{2}·13
638	2·11·29
639	3^{2}·71
640	2^{7}·5

641–660
641	**641**
642	2·3·107
643	**643**
644	2^{2}·7·23
645	3·5·43
646	2·17·19
647	**647**
648	2^{3}·3^{4}
649	11·59
650	2·5^{2}·13
651	3·7·31
652	2^{2}·163
653	**653**
654	2·3·109
655	5·131
656	2^{4}·41
657	3^{2}·73
658	2·7·47
659	**659**
660	2^{2}·3·5·11

661–680
661	**661**
662	2·331
663	3·13·17
664	2^{3}·83
665	5·7·19
666	2·3^{2}·37
667	23·29
668	2^{2}·167
669	3·223
670	2·5·67
671	11·61
672	2^{5}·3·7
673	**673**
674	2·337
675	3^{3}·5^{2}
676	2^{2}·13^{2}
677	**677**
678	2·3·113
679	7·97
680	2^{3}·5·17

681–700
681	3·227
682	2·11·31
683	**683**
684	2^{2}·3^{2}·19
685	5·137
686	2·7^{3}
687	3·229
688	2^{4}·43
689	13·53
690	2·3·5·23
691	**691**
692	2^{2}·173
693	3^{2}·7·11
694	2·347
695	5·139
696	2^{3}·3·29
697	17·41
698	2·349
699	3·233
700	2^{2}·5^{2}·7

== 701 to 800 ==
701–720
701	**701**
702	2·3^{3}·13
703	19·37
704	2^{6}·11
705	3·5·47
706	2·353
707	7·101
708	2^{2}·3·59
709	**709**
710	2·5·71
711	3^{2}·79
712	2^{3}·89
713	23·31
714	2·3·7·17
715	5·11·13
716	2^{2}·179
717	3·239
718	2·359
719	**719**
720	2^{4}·3^{2}·5

721–740
721	7·103
722	2·19^{2}
723	3·241
724	2^{2}·181
725	5^{2}·29
726	2·3·11^{2}
727	**727**
728	2^{3}·7·13
729	3^{6}
730	2·5·73
731	17·43
732	2^{2}·3·61
733	**733**
734	2·367
735	3·5·7^{2}
736	2^{5}·23
737	11·67
738	2·3^{2}·41
739	**739**
740	2^{2}·5·37

741–760
741	3·13·19
742	2·7·53
743	**743**
744	2^{3}·3·31
745	5·149
746	2·373
747	3^{2}·83
748	2^{2}·11·17
749	7·107
750	2·3·5^{3}
751	**751**
752	2^{4}·47
753	3·251
754	2·13·29
755	5·151
756	2^{2}·3^{3}·7
757	**757**
758	2·379
759	3·11·23
760	2^{3}·5·19

761–780
761	**761**
762	2·3·127
763	7·109
764	2^{2}·191
765	3^{2}·5·17
766	2·383
767	13·59
768	2^{8}·3
769	**769**
770	2·5·7·11
771	3·257
772	2^{2}·193
773	**773**
774	2·3^{2}·43
775	5^{2}·31
776	2^{3}·97
777	3·7·37
778	2·389
779	19·41
780	2^{2}·3·5·13

781–800
781	11·71
782	2·17·23
783	3^{3}·29
784	2^{4}·7^{2}
785	5·157
786	2·3·131
787	**787**
788	2^{2}·197
789	3·263
790	2·5·79
791	7·113
792	2^{3}·3^{2}·11
793	13·61
794	2·397
795	3·5·53
796	2^{2}·199
797	**797**
798	2·3·7·19
799	17·47
800	2^{5}·5^{2}

== 801 to 900 ==
801–820
801	3^{2}·89
802	2·401
803	11·73
804	2^{2}·3·67
805	5·7·23
806	2·13·31
807	3·269
808	2^{3}·101
809	**809**
810	2·3^{4}·5
811	**811**
812	2^{2}·7·29
813	3·271
814	2·11·37
815	5·163
816	2^{4}·3·17
817	19·43
818	2·409
819	3^{2}·7·13
820	2^{2}·5·41

821–840
821	**821**
822	2·3·137
823	**823**
824	2^{3}·103
825	3·5^{2}·11
826	2·7·59
827	**827**
828	2^{2}·3^{2}·23
829	**829**
830	2·5·83
831	3·277
832	2^{6}·13
833	7^{2}·17
834	2·3·139
835	5·167
836	2^{2}·11·19
837	3^{3}·31
838	2·419
839	**839**
840	2^{3}·3·5·7

841–860
841	29^{2}
842	2·421
843	3·281
844	2^{2}·211
845	5·13^{2}
846	2·3^{2}·47
847	7·11^{2}
848	2^{4}·53
849	3·283
850	2·5^{2}·17
851	23·37
852	2^{2}·3·71
853	**853**
854	2·7·61
855	3^{2}·5·19
856	2^{3}·107
857	**857**
858	2·3·11·13
859	**859**
860	2^{2}·5·43

861–880
861	3·7·41
862	2·431
863	**863**
864	2^{5}·3^{3}
865	5·173
866	2·433
867	3·17^{2}
868	2^{2}·7·31
869	11·79
870	2·3·5·29
871	13·67
872	2^{3}·109
873	3^{2}·97
874	2·19·23
875	5^{3}·7
876	2^{2}·3·73
877	**877**
878	2·439
879	3·293
880	2^{4}·5·11

881–900
881	**881**
882	2·3^{2}·7^{2}
883	**883**
884	2^{2}·13·17
885	3·5·59
886	2·443
887	**887**
888	2^{3}·3·37
889	7·127
890	2·5·89
891	3^{4}·11
892	2^{2}·223
893	19·47
894	2·3·149
895	5·179
896	2^{7}·7
897	3·13·23
898	2·449
899	29·31
900	2^{2}·3^{2}·5^{2}

== 901 to 1000 ==
901–920
901	17·53
902	2·11·41
903	3·7·43
904	2^{3}·113
905	5·181
906	2·3·151
907	**907**
908	2^{2}·227
909	3^{2}·101
910	2·5·7·13
911	**911**
912	2^{4}·3·19
913	11·83
914	2·457
915	3·5·61
916	2^{2}·229
917	7·131
918	2·3^{3}·17
919	**919**
920	2^{3}·5·23

921–940
921	3·307
922	2·461
923	13·71
924	2^{2}·3·7·11
925	5^{2}·37
926	2·463
927	3^{2}·103
928	2^{5}·29
929	**929**
930	2·3·5·31
931	7^{2}·19
932	2^{2}·233
933	3·311
934	2·467
935	5·11·17
936	2^{3}·3^{2}·13
937	**937**
938	2·7·67
939	3·313
940	2^{2}·5·47

941–960
941	**941**
942	2·3·157
943	23·41
944	2^{4}·59
945	3^{3}·5·7
946	2·11·43
947	**947**
948	2^{2}·3·79
949	13·73
950	2·5^{2}·19
951	3·317
952	2^{3}·7·17
953	**953**
954	2·3^{2}·53
955	5·191
956	2^{2}·239
957	3·11·29
958	2·479
959	7·137
960	2^{6}·3·5

961–980
961	31^{2}
962	2·13·37
963	3^{2}·107
964	2^{2}·241
965	5·193
966	2·3·7·23
967	**967**
968	2^{3}·11^{2}
969	3·17·19
970	2·5·97
971	**971**
972	2^{2}·3^{5}
973	7·139
974	2·487
975	3·5^{2}·13
976	2^{4}·61
977	**977**
978	2·3·163
979	11·89
980	2^{2}·5·7^{2}

981–1000
981	3^{2}·109
982	2·491
983	**983**
984	2^{3}·3·41
985	5·197
986	2·17·29
987	3·7·47
988	2^{2}·13·19
989	23·43
990	2·3^{2}·5·11
991	**991**
992	2^{5}·31
993	3·331
994	2·7·71
995	5·199
996	2^{2}·3·83
997	**997**
998	2·499
999	3^{3}·37
1000	2^{3}·5^{3}

== See also ==
- Fundamental theorem of arithmetic – Integers have unique prime factorizations
- List of prime numbers
- Table of divisors
