= List of numbers =

This is a list of notable numbers and articles about them. The list does not contain all numbers in existence as most of the number sets are infinite. Numbers may be included in the list based on their mathematical, historical or cultural notability, but all numbers have qualities that could arguably make them notable. Even the smallest "uninteresting" number is paradoxically interesting for that very property. This is known as the interesting number paradox.

The definition of what is classed as a number is rather diffuse and based on historical distinctions. For example, the pair of numbers (3,4) is commonly regarded as a number when it is in the form of a complex number (3+4i), but not when it is in the form of a vector (3,4). This list will also be categorized with the standard convention of types of numbers.

This list focuses on numbers as mathematical objects and is not a list of numerals, which are linguistic devices: nouns, adjectives, or adverbs that designate numbers. The distinction is drawn between the number five (an abstract object equal to 2+3), and the numeral five (the noun referring to the number).

== Natural numbers ==
Natural numbers are a subset of the integers and are of historical and pedagogical value as they can be used for counting and often have ethno-cultural significance (see below). Beyond this, natural numbers are widely used as a building block for other number systems including the integers, rational numbers and real numbers. Natural numbers are those used for counting (as in "there are six coins on the table") and ordering (as in "this is the third largest city in the country"). In common language, words used for counting are "sinal numbers" and words used for ordering are "ordinal numbers". Defined by the Peano axioms, the natural numbers form an infinitely large set. Often referred to as "the naturals", the natural numbers are usually symbolised by a boldface N (or blackboard bold $\mathbb{\N}$, Unicode U+2115 ℕ DOUBLE-STRUCK CAPITAL N).

The inclusion of 0 in the set of natural numbers is ambiguous and subject to individual definitions. In set theory and computer science, 0 is typically considered a natural number. In number theory, it usually is not. The ambiguity can be solved with the terms "non-negative integers", which includes 0, and "positive integers", which does not.

Natural numbers may be used as cardinal numbers, which may go by various names. Natural numbers may also be used as ordinal numbers.

Table of notable natural numbers
0	1	2	3	4	5	6	7	8	9
10	11	12	13	14	15	16	17	18	19
20	21	22	23	24	25	26	27	28	29
30	31	32	33	34	35	36	37	38	39
40	41	42	43	44	45	46	47	48	49
50	51	52	53	54	55	56	57	58	59
60	61	62	63	64	65	66	67	68	69
70	71	72	73	74	75	76	77	78	79
80	81	82	83	84	85	86	87	88	89
90	91	92	93	94	95	96	97	98	99
100	101	102	103	104	105	106	107	108	109
110	111	112	113	114	115	116	117	118	119
120	121	122	123	124	125	126	127	128	129
130	131	132	133	134	135	136	137	138	139
140	141	142	143	144	145	146	147	148	149
150	151	152	153	154	155	156	157	158	159
160	161	162	163	164	165	166	167	168	169
170	171	172	173	174	175	176	177	178	179
180	181	182	183	184	185	186	187	188	189
190	191	192	193	194	195	196	197	198	199
200	201	202	203	204	205	206	207	208	209
210	211	212	213	214	215	216	217	218	219
220	221	222	223	224	225	226	227	228	229
230	231	232	233	234	235	236	237	238	239
240	241	242	243	244	245	246	247	248	249
250	251	252	253	254	255	256	257	258	259
260	261	262	263	264	265	266	267	268	269
270	271	272	273	274	275	276	277	278	279
280	281	282	283	284	285	286	287	288	289
290	291	292	293	294	295	296	297	298	299
300	301	302	303		305				
								318	
	341		343				347		
			353						
360					365	366			
			383	384					
									399
400									
420									
					495	496			
500	501								
	511	512							
	561		563						
			593						
600									
610			613			616			
						666			
			693						
700			703						
720								728	
							777		
						786			
800									
						836			
840									
							877		
								888	
900									
									999
1000	1001	1002	1003						
			1023	1024					
									1089
			1093						
					1105				
				1124					
				1234					
1260									
		1722						1728	1729
2000									
2520									
3000									
	3511								
4000									
				4104					
5000									
5040									
6000									
				6174					
7000									
				7744					
					7825				
8000									
								8128	
	8191	8192							
9000									
	9801								
					9855				
									9999
10,000									
12,000									
							16,807		
			16,843						
20,000									
							20,067		
20,990									
30,000									
40,000									
50,000									
60,000									
									64,079
					65,535	65,536	65,537		
70,000									
							78,557		
80,000									
90,000									
10^{5}									
						123,456			
		131,072							
							142,857		
144,000									
	294,001								
			509,203						
10^{6}									
10^{7}									
									43,112,609
10^{8}									
10^{9}									
							2,147,483,647		
					4,294,967,295				
10^{10}									
10^{11}									
10^{12}									
10^{13}									
larger numbers, including 10^{100} and 10^{10^{100}}

=== Mathematical significance ===
Natural numbers may have properties specific to the individual number or may be part of a set (such as prime numbers) of numbers with a particular property.

List of mathematically significant natural numbers
- 1, the multiplicative identity. Also the only natural number (not including 0) that is not prime or composite.
- 2, the base of the binary number system, used in almost all modern computers and information systems. Also the smallest prime number, and divisibility by this number is what defines a numbers' parity.
- 3, 2^{2} − 1, the first Mersenne prime and first Fermat number. It is the first odd prime, and it is also the 2 bit integer maximum value.
- 4, the first composite number.
- 5, the sum of the first two primes and only prime which is the sum of 2 consecutive primes. The ratio of the length from the side to a diagonal of a regular pentagon is the golden ratio.
- 6, the first of the series of perfect numbers, whose proper factors sum to the number itself.
- 7, the first and only prime number preceding a cube.
- 8, the largest cube in the Fibonacci sequence.
- 9, the first odd number that is composite.
- 10, the base of the decimal system, used in everyday life.
- 11, the fifth prime and first palindromic multi-digit number in base 10.
- 12, the first sublime number.
- 17, the sum of the first 4 prime numbers, and the only prime which is the sum of 4 consecutive primes.
- 24, all Dirichlet characters mod n are real if and only if n is a divisor of 24.
- 25, the first centered square number besides 1 that is also a square number.
- 27, the cube of 3, the value of 3^{3}.
- 28, the second perfect number.
- 30, the smallest sphenic number.
- 32, the smallest nontrivial fifth power.
- 36, the smallest number which is a perfect power but not a prime power.
- 70, the smallest weird number.
- 72, the smallest Achilles number.
- 108, the second Achilles number.
- 255, 2^{8} − 1, the smallest perfect totient number that is neither a power of three nor thrice a prime; it is also the largest number that can be represented using an 8-bit unsigned integer.
- 341, the smallest base 2 Fermat pseudoprime.
- 496, the third perfect number.
- 1729, the Hardy–Ramanujan number, also known as the second taxicab number; that is, the smallest positive integer that can be written as the sum of two positive cubes in two different ways.
- 8128, the fourth perfect number.
- 142857, the smallest base 10 cyclic number.
- 9814072356, the largest perfect power that contains no repeated digits in base ten.

=== Cultural or practical significance ===
Along with their mathematical properties, many integers have cultural significance or are also notable for their use in computing and measurement. As mathematical properties (such as divisibility) can confer practical utility, there may be interplay and connections between the cultural or practical significance of an integer and its mathematical properties.

List of integers notable for their cultural meanings
- 3, significant in Christianity as the Trinity. Also considered significant in Hinduism (Trimurti, Tridevi). Holds significance in a number of ancient mythologies.
- 4, considered an "unlucky" number in modern China, Japan and Korea due to its audible similarity to the word "death" in their respective languages.
- 7, the number of days in a week, and considered a "lucky" number in Western cultures.
- 8, considered a "lucky" number in Chinese culture due to its aural similarity to the Chinese term for prosperity.
- 12, a common grouping known as a dozen and the number of months in a year, of constellations of the Zodiac and astrological signs and of Apostles of Jesus.
- 13, considered an "unlucky" number in Western superstition. Also known as a "Baker's dozen".
- 17, considered ill-fated in Italy and other countries of Greek and Latin origins.
- 18, considered a "lucky" number due to it being the value for the Hebrew word for life in Jewish numerology.
- 40, considered a significant number in Tengrism and Turkish folklore. Multiple customs, such as those relating to how many days one must visit someone after a death in the family, include the number forty.
- 42, the "answer to the ultimate question of life, the universe, and everything" in the popular 1979 science fiction work The Hitchhiker's Guide to the Galaxy.
- 69, a slang term for reciprocal oral sex.
- 86, a slang term that is used in the American popular culture as a transitive verb to mean throw out or get rid of.
- 108, considered sacred by the Dharmic religions. Approximately equal to the ratio of the distance from Earth to Sun and diameter of the Sun.
- 420, a code-term that refers to the consumption of cannabis.
- 666, the number of the beast from the Book of Revelation.
- 786, regarded as sacred in the Muslim Abjad numerology.
- 5040, mentioned by Plato in the Laws as one of the most important numbers for the city.
List of integers notable for their use in units, measurements and scales
- 10, the number of digits in the decimal number system.
- 12, the number base for measuring time in many civilizations.
- 14, the number of days in a fortnight.
- 16, the number of digits in the hexadecimal number system.
- 24, number of hours in a day.
- 31, the number of days most months of the year have.
- 60, the number base for some ancient counting systems, such as the Babylonians', and the basis for many modern measuring systems.
- 360, the number of sexagesimal degrees in a full circle.
- 365, the number of days in the common year, while there are 366 days in a leap year of the solar Gregorian calendar.
- 1000, the scale factor of most metric prefixes.
- 9192631770, the second is defined as this many transitions of the Cs-133 atom.
List of integers notable in computing
- 2, radix of binary numbers used in most digital electronics.
- 4, the number of bits in a nibble.
- 8, the number of bits in an octet and usually in a byte.
- 16, used as a radix in hexadecimal notation. Also frequently used memory bus width (in bits) in older systems.
- 32 and 64, typical memory bus widths (in bits) in contemporary systems.
- 256, The number of possible combinations within 8 bits, or an octet.
- 1024, the number of bytes in a kibibyte, and bits in a kibibit.
- 65535, 2^{16} − 1, the maximum value of a 16-bit unsigned integer.
- 65536, 2^{16}, the number of possible 16-bit combinations.
- 65537, 2^{16} + 1, the most popular RSA public key prime exponent in most SSL/TLS certificates on the Web/Internet.
- 16777216, 2^{24}, or 16^{6}; the hexadecimal "million" (0x1000000), and the total number of possible color combinations in 24/32-bit True Color computer graphics.
- 2147483647, 2^{31} − 1, the maximum value of a 32-bit signed integer using two's complement representation.
- 9223372036854775807, 2^{63} − 1, the maximum value of a 64-bit signed integer using two's complement representation.

== Classes of natural numbers ==
Subsets of the natural numbers, such as the prime numbers, may be grouped into sets, for instance based on the divisibility of their members. Infinitely many such sets are possible. A list of notable classes of natural numbers may be found at classes of natural numbers.

=== Prime numbers ===
A prime number is a positive integer which has exactly two divisors: 1 and itself.

The first 100 prime numbers are:

Table of first 100 prime numbers
2	3	5	7	11	13	17	19	23	29
31	37	41	43	47	53	59	61	67	71
73	79	83	89	97	101	103	107	109	113
127	131	137	139	149	151	157	163	167	173
179	181	191	193	197	199	211	223	227	229
233	239	241	251	257	263	269	271	277	281
283	293	307	311	313	317	331	337	347	349
353	359	367	373	379	383	389	397	401	409
419	421	431	433	439	443	449	457	461	463
467	479	487	491	499	503	509	521	523	541

=== Highly composite numbers ===
A highly composite number (HCN) is a positive integer with more divisors than any smaller positive integer. They are often used in geometry, grouping and time measurement.

The first 20 highly composite numbers are:

1, 2, 4, 6, 12, 24, 36, 48, 60, 120, 180, 240, 360, 720, 840, 1260, 1680, 2520, 5040, 7560

=== Perfect numbers ===
A perfect number is an integer that is the sum of its positive proper divisors (all divisors except itself).

The first 10 perfect numbers:

1. 6
2. 28
3. 496
4. 8128
5. 33 550 336
6. 8 589 869 056
7. 137 438 691 328
8. 2 305 843 008 139 952 128
9. 2 658 455 991 569 831 744 654 692 615 953 842 176
10. 191 561 942 608 236 107 294 793 378 084 303 638 130 997 321 548 169 216

== Integers ==
The integers are a set of numbers commonly encountered in arithmetic and number theory. There are many subsets of the integers, including the natural numbers, prime numbers, perfect numbers, etc. Many integers are notable for their mathematical properties. Integers are usually symbolized by a boldface Z (or blackboard bold $\mathbb{\Z}$, Unicode U+2124 ℤ DOUBLE-STRUCK CAPITAL Z); this became the symbol for the integers based on the German word for "numbers" (Zahlen).

Notable integers include −1, the additive inverse of unity, and 0, the additive identity.

As with the natural numbers, the integers may also have cultural or practical significance. For instance, −40 is the equal point in the Fahrenheit and Celsius scales.

=== SI prefixes ===
One important use of integers is in orders of magnitude. A power of 10 is a number 10^{k}, where k is an integer. For instance, with k = 0, 1, 2, 3, ..., the appropriate powers of ten are 1, 10, 100, 1000, ... Powers of ten can also be fractional: for instance, k = -3 gives 1/1000, or 0.001. This is used in scientific notation, real numbers are written in the form m × 10^{n}. The number 394,000 is written in this form as 3.94 × 10^{5}.

Integers are used as prefixes in the SI system. A metric prefix is a unit prefix that precedes a basic unit of measure to indicate a multiple or fraction of the unit. Each prefix has a unique symbol that is prepended to the unit symbol. The prefix kilo-, for example, may be added to gram to indicate multiplication by one thousand: one kilogram is equal to one thousand grams. The prefix milli-, likewise, may be added to metre to indicate division by one thousand; one millimetre is equal to one thousandth of a metre.

Value	1000^{m}	Name	Symbol
1000	1000^{1}	Kilo	k
1000000	1000^{2}	Mega	M
1000000000	1000^{3}	Giga	G
1000000000000	1000^{4}	Tera	T
1000000000000000	1000^{5}	Peta	P
1000000000000000000	1000^{6}	Exa	E
1000000000000000000000	1000^{7}	Zetta	Z
1000000000000000000000000	1000^{8}	Yotta	Y
1000000000000000000000000000	1000^{9}	Ronna	R
1000000000000000000000000000000	1000^{10}	Quetta	Q

== Rational numbers ==
A rational number is any number that can be expressed as the quotient or fraction p/q of two integers, a numerator p and a non-zero denominator q. Since q may be equal to 1, every integer is trivially a rational number. The set of all rational numbers, often referred to as "the rationals", the field of rationals or the field of rational numbers is usually denoted by a boldface Q (or blackboard bold $\mathbb{Q}$, Unicode U+211A ℚ DOUBLE-STRUCK CAPITAL Q); it was thus denoted in 1895 by Giuseppe Peano after quoziente, Italian for "quotient".

Rational numbers such as 0.12 can be represented in infinitely many ways, e.g. zero-point-one-two (0.12), three twenty-fifths (3/25), nine seventy-fifths (9/75), etc. This can be mitigated by representing rational numbers in a canonical form as an irreducible fraction.

A list of rational numbers is shown below. The names of fractions can be found at numeral (linguistics).

Table of notable rational numbers
Decimal expansion	Fraction	Notability
1.0	1/1	One is the multiplicative identity. One is a rational number, as it is equal to 1/1.
1	1/1	One is the multiplicative identity. One is a rational number, as it is equal to 1/1.
−0.083 333...	− 1/12	The value assigned to the series 1+2+3... by zeta function regularization and Ramanujan summation.
0.5	1/2	One half occurs commonly in mathematical equations and in real world proportions. One half appears in the formula for the area of a triangle: 1/2 × base × perpendicular height and in the formulae for figurate numbers, such as triangular numbers and pentagonal numbers.
3.142 857...	22/7	A widely used approximation for the number $\pi$. It can be proven that this number exceeds $\pi$.
0.166 666...	1/6	One sixth. Often appears in mathematical equations, such as in the sum of squares of the integers and in the solution to the Basel problem.

== Real numbers ==
Real numbers are least upper bounds of sets of rational numbers that are bounded above, or greatest lower bounds of sets of rational numbers that are bounded below, or limits of convergent sequences of rational numbers. Real numbers that are not rational numbers are called irrational numbers. The real numbers are categorized as algebraic numbers (which are the root of a polynomial with rational coefficients) or transcendental numbers, which are not; all rational numbers are algebraic.

=== Algebraic numbers ===
Name	Expression	Decimal expansion	Notability
Golden ratio conjugate ($\Phi$)	$\frac{\sqrt{5}-1}{2}$	0.618033988749894848204586834366	Reciprocal of (and one less than) the golden ratio.
Twelfth root of two	$\sqrt[12]{2}$	1.059463094359295264561825294946	Proportion between the frequencies of adjacent semitones in the 12-tone equal temperament scale.
Cube root of two	$\sqrt[3]{2}$	1.259921049894873164767210607278	Length of the edge of a cube with volume two. See doubling the cube for the significance of this number.
Conway's constant	(cannot be written as expressions involving integers and the operations of addition, subtraction, multiplication, division, and the extraction of roots)	1.303577269034296391257099112153	Defined as the unique positive real root of a certain polynomial of degree 71. The limit ratio between subsequent numbers in the binary Look-and-say sequence (OEIS: A014715).
Plastic ratio	$\sqrt[3]{\frac{1}{2} +\frac{1}{6} \sqrt{\frac{23}{3}}} +\sqrt[3]{\frac{1}{2} -\frac{1}{6} \sqrt{\frac{23}{3}}}$	1.324717957244746025960908854478	The only real solution of $x^3 = x + 1$.(OEIS: A060006) The limit ratio between subsequent numbers in the Van der Laan sequence. (OEIS: A182097)
Square root of two	$\sqrt{2}$	1.414213562373095048801688724210	√2 = 2 sin 45° = 2 cos 45° Square root of two a.k.a. Pythagoras' constant. Ratio of diagonal to side length in a square. Proportion between the sides of paper sizes in the ISO 216 series (originally DIN 476 series).
Supergolden ratio	$\dfrac{1 +\sqrt[3]{\dfrac{29 +3\sqrt{3 \cdot 31}}{2}} +\sqrt[3]{\dfrac{29 -3\sqrt{3 \cdot 31}}{2}}}{3}$	1.465571231876768026656731225220	The only real solution of $x^3 = x^2 + 1$.(OEIS: A092526) The limit ratio between subsequent numbers in Narayana's cows sequence. (OEIS: A000930)
Triangular root of 2	$\frac{\sqrt{17}-1}{2}$	1.561552812808830274910704927987	
Golden ratio (φ)	$\frac{\sqrt{5}+1}{2}$	1.618033988749894848204586834366	The larger of the two real roots of x^{2} = x + 1.
Square root of three	$\sqrt{3}$	1.732050807568877293527446341506	√3 = 2 sin 60° = 2 cos 30° . A.k.a. the measure of the fish or Theodorus' constant. Length of the space diagonal of a cube with edge length 1. Altitude of an equilateral triangle with side length 2. Altitude of a regular hexagon with side length 1 and diagonal length 2.
Tribonacci constant	$\frac{1 +\sqrt[3]{19 +3\sqrt{3 \cdot 11}} +\sqrt[3]{19 -3\sqrt{3 \cdot 11}}}{3}$	1.839286755214161132551852564653	The only real solution of $x^3 = x^2 + x + 1$.(OEIS: A058265) The limit ratio between subsequent numbers in the Tribonacci sequence.(OEIS: A000073) Appears in the volume and coordinates of the snub cube and some related polyhedra.
Supersilver ratio	$\dfrac{2 +\sqrt[3]{\dfrac{43 +3\sqrt{3 \cdot 59}}{2}} +\sqrt[3]{\dfrac{43 -3\sqrt{3 \cdot 59}}{2}}}{3}$	2.20556943040059031170202861778	The only real solution of $x^3 = 2x^2 + 1$.(OEIS: A356035) The limit ratio between subsequent numbers in the third-order Pell sequence. (OEIS: A008998)
Square root of five	$\sqrt{5}$	2.236067977499789696409173668731	Length of the diagonal of a 1 × 2 rectangle.
Silver ratio (δ_{S})	$\sqrt{2}+1$	2.414213562373095048801688724210	The larger of the two real roots of x^{2} = 2x + 1. Altitude of a regular octagon with side length 1.
Bronze ratio (S_{3})	$\frac{\sqrt{13}+3}{2}$	3.302775637731994646559610633735	The larger of the two real roots of x^{2} = 3x + 1.

=== Transcendental numbers ===
Name	Symbol or Formula	Decimal expansion	Notes and notability
Gelfond's constant	$e^{\pi}$	23.14069263277925...	
Ramanujan's constant	$e^{\pi\sqrt{163}}$	262537412640768743.99999999999925...	
Gaussian integral	$\sqrt{\pi}$	1.772453850905516...	
Komornik–Loreti constant	$q$	1.787231650...	
Universal parabolic constant	$P_2$	2.29558714939...	
Gelfond–Schneider constant	$2^{\sqrt{2}}$	2.665144143...	
Euler's number	$e$	2.718281828459045235360287471352662497757247...	Raising e to the power of $i$π will result in $-1$.
Pi	$\pi$	3.141592653589793238462643383279502884197169399375...	Pi is a constant irrational number that is the result of dividing the circumference of a circle by its diameter.
Super square-root of 2	$\sqrt{2}_s$	1.559610469...	
Liouville constant	$L$	0.110001000000000000000001000...	The decimal number with 1 in the nth position after the decimal point if n is a factorial and 0 elsewhere.
Champernowne constant	$C_{10}$	0.12345678910111213141516...	This constant contains every number string inside it, as its decimals are just every number in order. (1,2,3,etc.)
Prouhet–Thue–Morse constant	$\tau$	0.412454033640...	
Omega constant	$\Omega$	0.5671432904097838729999686622...	
Cahen's constant	$C$	0.64341054629...	
Natural logarithm of 2	ln 2	0.693147180559945309417232121458	
Lemniscate constant	$\varpi$	2.622057554292119810464839589891...	The ratio of the perimeter of Bernoulli's lemniscate to its diameter.
Tau	$\tau=2\pi$	6.283185307179586476925286766559...	The ratio of the circumference to a radius, and the number of radians in a complete circle; 2 $\times$ π

=== Irrational but not known to be transcendental ===
Some numbers are known to be irrational numbers, but have not been proven to be transcendental. This differs from the algebraic numbers, which are known not to be transcendental.

Name	Decimal expansion	Proof of irrationality	Reference of unknown transcendentality
ζ(3), also known as Apéry's constant	1.202056903159594285399738161511449990764986292		
Erdős–Borwein constant, E	1.606695152415291763...		
Copeland–Erdős constant	0.235711131719232931374143...	Can be proven with Dirichlet's theorem on arithmetic progressions or Bertrand's postulate (Hardy and Wright, p. 113) or Ramare's theorem that every even integer is a sum of at most six primes. It also follows directly from its normality.	
Prime constant, ρ	0.414682509851111660248109622...	Proof of the number's irrationality is given at prime constant.	
Reciprocal Fibonacci constant, ψ	3.359885666243177553172011302918927179688905133731...		

=== Real but not known to be irrational, nor transcendental ===
For some numbers, it is not known whether they are algebraic or transcendental. The following list includes real numbers that have not been proved to be irrational, nor transcendental.

Name and symbol	Decimal expansion	Notes
Euler–Mascheroni constant, γ	0.577215664901532860606512090082...	Believed to be transcendental but not proven to be so. However, it was shown that at least one of $\gamma$ and the Euler-Gompertz constant $\delta$ is transcendental. It was also shown that all but at most one number in an infinite list containing $\frac{\gamma}{4}$ have to be transcendental.
Euler–Gompertz constant, δ	0.596 347 362 323 194 074 341 078 499 369...	It was shown that at least one of the Euler-Mascheroni constant $\gamma$ and the Euler-Gompertz constant $\delta$ is transcendental.
Catalan's constant, G	0.915965594177219015054603514932384110774...	It is not known whether this number is irrational.
Khinchin's constant, K_{0}	2.685452001...	It is not known whether this number is irrational.
1st Feigenbaum constant, δ	4.6692...	Both Feigenbaum constants are believed to be transcendental, although they have not been proven to be so.
2nd Feigenbaum constant, α	2.5029...	Both Feigenbaum constants are believed to be transcendental, although they have not been proven to be so.
Glaisher–Kinkelin constant, A	1.28242712...	
Backhouse's constant	1.456074948...	
Fransén–Robinson constant, F	2.8077702420...	
Lévy's constant,β	1.18656 91104 15625 45282...	
Mills' constant, A	1.30637788386308069046...	It is not known whether this number is irrational.(Finch 2003)
Ramanujan–Soldner constant, μ	1.451369234883381050283968485892027449493...	
Sierpiński's constant, K	2.5849817595792532170658936...	
Totient summatory constant	1.339784...	
Vardi's constant, E	1.264084735305...	
Somos' quadratic recurrence constant, σ	1.661687949633594121296...	
Niven's constant, C	1.705211...	
Brun's constant, B_{2}	1.902160583104...	The irrationality of this number would be a consequence of the truth of the infinitude of twin primes.
Landau's totient constant	1.943596...	
Brun's constant for prime quadruplets, B_{4}	0.8705883800...	
Viswanath's constant	1.1319882487943...	
Khinchin–Lévy constant	1.1865691104...	This number represents the probability that three random numbers have no common factor greater than 1.
Landau–Ramanujan constant	0.76422365358922066299069873125...	
C(1)	0.77989340037682282947420641365...	
Z(1)	−0.736305462867317734677899828925614672...	
Heath-Brown–Moroz constant, C	0.001317641...	
Kepler–Bouwkamp constant,K'	0.1149420448...	
MRB constant,S	0.187859...	It is not known whether this number is irrational.
Meissel–Mertens constant, M	0.2614972128476427837554268386086958590516...	
Bernstein's constant, β	0.2801694990...	
Gauss–Kuzmin–Wirsing constant, λ_{1}	0.3036630029...	
Hafner–Sarnak–McCurley constant,σ	0.3532363719...	
Artin's constant,C_{Artin}	0.3739558136...	
S(1)	0.438259147390354766076756696625152...	
F(1)	0.538079506912768419136387420407556...	
Stephens' constant	0.575959...	
Golomb–Dickman constant, λ	0.62432998854355087099293638310083724...	
Twin prime constant, C_{2}	0.660161815846869573927812110014...	
Feller–Tornier constant	0.661317...	
Laplace limit, ε	0.6627434193...	
Embree–Trefethen constant	0.70258...	

=== Numbers not known with high precision ===
Some real numbers, including transcendental numbers, are not known with high precision.

- The constant in the Berry–Esseen Theorem: 0.4097 < C < 0.4748
- De Bruijn–Newman constant: 0 ≤ Λ ≤ 0.2
- Chaitin's constants Ω, which are transcendental and provably impossible to compute.
- Bloch's constant (also 2nd Landau's constant): 0.4332 < B < 0.4719
- 1st Landau's constant: 0.5 < L < 0.5433
- 3rd Landau's constant: 0.5 < A ≤ 0.7853
- Grothendieck constant: 1.67 < k < 1.79
- Romanov's constant in Romanov's theorem: 0.107648 < d < 0.49094093, Romanov conjectured that it is 0.434

== Hypercomplex numbers ==
Hypercomplex number is a term for an element of a unital algebra over the field of real numbers. The complex numbers are often symbolised by a boldface C (or blackboard bold $\mathbb{\Complex}$, Unicode U+2102 ℂ DOUBLE-STRUCK CAPITAL C), while the set of quaternions is denoted by a boldface H (or blackboard bold $\mathbb{H}$, Unicode U+210D ℍ DOUBLE-STRUCK CAPITAL H).

=== Algebraic complex numbers ===
- Imaginary unit: $i=\sqrt{-1}$
- nth roots of unity: $\xi_{n}^{k}=\cos\bigl(2\pi\frac{k}{n}\bigr)+i\sin\bigl(2\pi\frac{k}{n}\bigr)$, while $0 \leq k \leq n-10$, GCD(k, n) = 1

=== Other hypercomplex numbers ===
- The quaternions
- The octonions
- The sedenions
- The trigintaduonions
- The dual numbers (with an infinitesimal)

== Transfinite numbers ==
Transfinite numbers are numbers that are "infinite" in the sense that they are larger than all finite numbers, yet not necessarily absolutely infinite.

- Aleph-null: ℵ_{0}, the smallest infinite cardinal, and the cardinality of $\mathbb{N}$, the set of natural numbers
- Aleph-one: ℵ_{1}, the cardinality of ω_{1}, the set of all countable ordinal numbers
- Beth-one: $\beth_1$ or $\mathfrak c$, the cardinality of the continuum 2^{ℵ_{0}}
- Omega: ω, the smallest infinite ordinal

== Numbers representing physical quantities ==
Physical quantities that appear in the universe are often described using physical constants.

- Avogadro constant: N_{A} = 6.02214076×10^{23} mol^{−1}
- Electron mass: m_{e} = 9.1093837139(28)×10^{−31} kg
- Fine-structure constant: α = 0.0072973525643(11)
- Gravitational constant: G = 6.67430(15)×10^{−11} m^{3}⋅kg^{−1}⋅s^{−2}
- Molar mass constant: M_{u} = 1.00000000105(31)×10^{−3} kg⋅mol^{−1}
- Planck constant: h = 6.62607015×10^{−34} J⋅Hz^{−1}
- Rydberg constant: R_{∞} = 10973731.568157(12) m^{−1}
- Speed of light in vacuum: c = 299792458 m⋅s^{−1}
- Vacuum permittivity: ε_{0} = 8.8541878188(14)×10^{−12} F⋅m^{−1}

== Numbers representing geographical and astronomical distances ==
- 6378.137, the average equatorial radius of Earth in kilometers (following GRS 80 and WGS 84 standards)
- 40075.0167, the length of the Equator in kilometers (following GRS 80 and WGS 84 standards)
- 384399, the semi-major axis of the orbit of the Moon, in kilometers, roughly the distance between the center of Earth and that of the Moon
- 149597870700, the average distance between the Earth and the Sun or Astronomical Unit (AU), in meters
- 9460730472580800, one light-year, the distance travelled by light in one Julian year, in meters
- 30856775814913673, the distance of one parsec, another astronomical unit, in whole meters

== Numbers without specific values ==
Many languages have words expressing indefinite and fictitious numbers—inexact terms of indefinite size, used for comic effect, for exaggeration, as placeholder names, or when precision is unnecessary or undesirable. One technical term for such words is "non-numerical vague quantifier". Such words designed to indicate large quantities can be called "indefinite hyperbolic numerals".

== Named numbers ==
- Hardy–Ramanujan number, 1729
- Kaprekar's constant, 6174
- Eddington number, ~10^{80}
- Googol, 10^{100}
- Shannon number
- Centillion, 10^{303}
- Skewes's number
- Googolplex, 10^{(10^{100})}
- Mega/Circle(2)
- Moser's number
- Graham's number
- TREE(3)
- SSCG(3)
- Rayo's number

== See also ==
- Absolute infinite
- English numerals
- Floating-point arithmetic
- Fraction
- Integer sequence
- Interesting number paradox
- Large numbers
- List of mathematical constants
- List of prime numbers
- List of types of numbers
- Mathematical constant
- Metric prefix
- Names of large numbers
- Names of small numbers
- Negative number
- Numeral (linguistics)
- Numeral prefix
- Order of magnitude
- Orders of magnitude (numbers)
- Ordinal number
- The Penguin Dictionary of Curious and Interesting Numbers
- Perfect numbers
- Power of two
- Power of 10
- Surreal number
- Table of prime factors
