= 399th Division =

399th Division may refer to:

- 399th Infantry Division, Wehrmacht, Germany
- 399th Rifle Division, Soviet Union

== See also ==
- List of military divisions by number
- 399th (disambiguation)
