= Number =

Used to count, measure, and label

Set inclusions between the natural numbers (ℕ), the integers (ℤ), the decimal fractions (𝔻), the rational numbers (ℚ), the real numbers (ℝ), and the complex numbers (ℂ)

A number is a mathematical object used to count, measure, order and label. The most basic examples are the natural numbers: 1, 2, 3, 4, 5, and so forth. Individual numbers can be represented in spoken or written language with number words, or with dedicated symbols called numerals; for example, "eleven" is a number word and "11" is the corresponding numeral. As only a limited list of symbols can be memorized, a numeral system is used to represent any number in an organized way. The most common representation is the Hindu–Arabic numeral system, a decimal system which can display any non-negative integer using a combination of ten Arabic numeral symbols called digits. (Note: In linguistics, a numeral can refer to a symbol like 5, but also to a word or a phrase that names a number, like "five hundred"; numerals include also other words representing numbers, like "dozen".) Numerals can be used for counting (as with cardinal number of a collection or set), for labelling (as with telephone numbers), for ordering (as with serial numbers), and for codes (as with ISBNs). In common usage, however, a numeral is not clearly distinguished from the number that it represents.

In mathematics, the notion of a number has been extended over the centuries to include zero (0), negative numbers such as negative one (−1), rational numbers such as one half $\left(\tfrac{1}{2}\right)$, real numbers such as the square root of 2 $\left(\sqrt{2}\right)$, and pi (π), and complex numbers which extend the real numbers with a square root of −1 (i), and its combinations with real numbers by adding or subtracting its multiples. Calculations with numbers are done with arithmetical operations, the most familiar being addition, subtraction, multiplication, division, and exponentiation. Their study or usage is called arithmetic, a term which may also refer to number theory, the study of the properties of numbers.

Viewing the concept of zero as a number required a fundamental shift in philosophy, identifying nothingness with a value. During the 19th century, mathematicians began to develop the various systems now called algebraic structures, which share certain properties of numbers, and may be seen as extending the concept. Some algebraic structures are explicitly referred to as numbers (such as the p-adic numbers and hypercomplex numbers) while others are not, but this is more a matter of convention than a mathematical distinction.

== History ==
=== First use of numbers ===
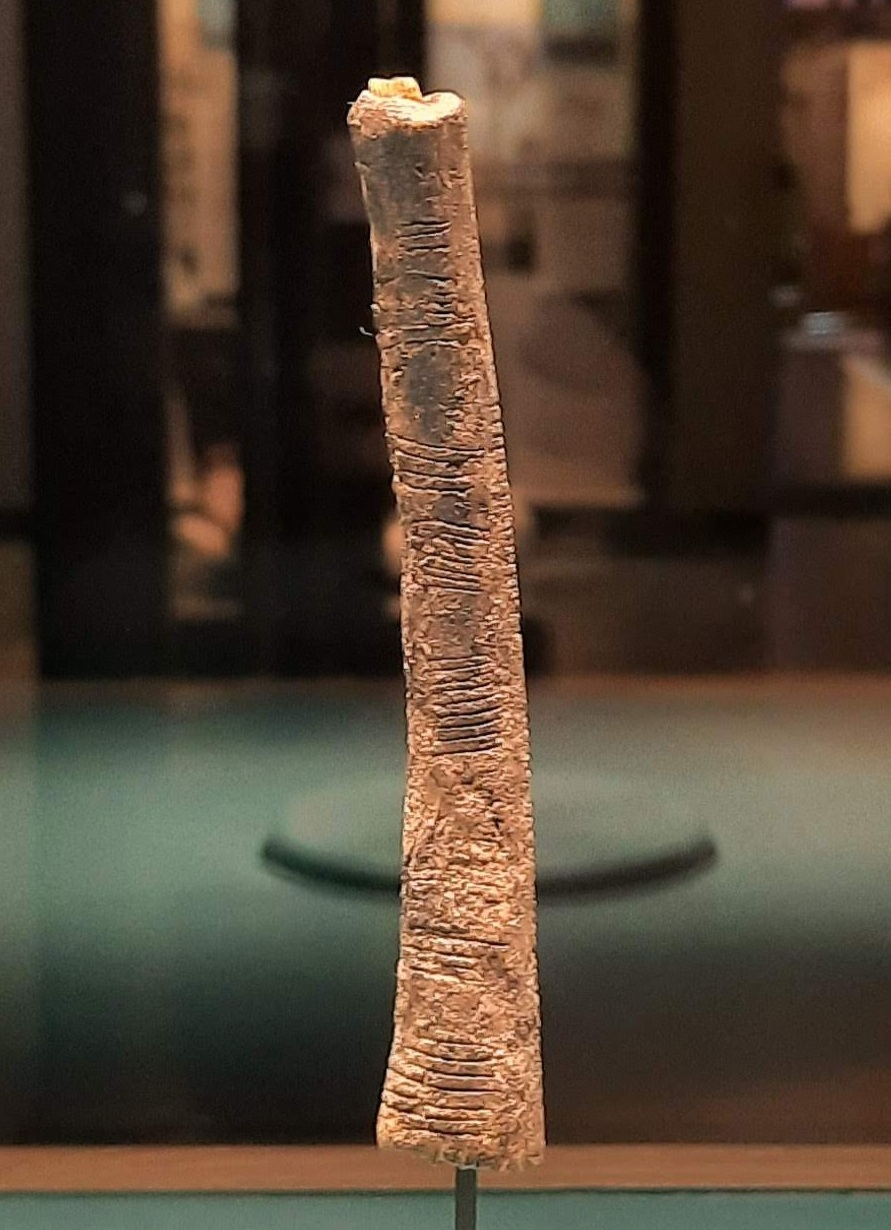
The Ishango bone on exhibit at the Belgian Museum of Natural Sciences

Bones and other artifacts have been discovered with marks cut into them that many believe are tally marks. Some historians suggest that the Lebombo bone (dated about 43,000 years ago) and the Ishango bone (dated about 22,000 to 30,000 years ago) are the oldest arithmetic artifacts but this interpretation is disputed. These tally marks may have been used for counting elapsed time, such as numbers of days, lunar cycles or keeping records of quantities, such as of animals. A perceptual system for quantity thought to underlie numeracy, is shared with other species, a phylogenetic distribution suggesting it would have existed before the emergence of language.

A tallying system has no concept of place value (as in modern decimal notation), which limits its representation of large numbers. Nevertheless, tallying systems are considered the first kind of abstract numeral system.

The earliest unambiguous numbers in the archaeological record are the Mesopotamian base 60 (sexagesimal) system (c. 3400 BC); place value emerged in the 3rd millennium BCE. The earliest known base 10 system dates to 3100 BC in Egypt. A Babylonian clay tablet dated to 1900–1600 BC provides an estimate of the circumference of a circle to its diameter of $3\frac{1}{8}$ = 3.125, possibly the oldest approximation of π.

=== Numerals ===
From the top, showing braille, hindu-arabic, Devanagari, Eastern Arabic, Chinese, Chinese financial, and Roman numerals

Numbers should be distinguished from numerals, the symbols used to represent numbers. The Egyptians invented the first ciphered numeral system, and the Greeks followed by mapping their counting numbers onto Ionian and Doric alphabets. (However, in 300 BC, Archimedes first demonstrated the use of a positional numeral system to display extremely large numbers in The Sand Reckoner.) Roman numerals, a system that used combinations of letters from the Roman alphabet, remained dominant in Europe until the spread of the Hindu–Arabic numeral system around the late 14th century, and the Hindu–Arabic numeral system remains the most common system for representing numbers in the world today. The key to the effectiveness of the system was the symbol for zero, which was developed by ancient Indian mathematicians around 500 AD.

=== Zero ===
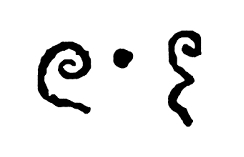
The number 605 in Khmer numerals, from an inscription from 683 AD. Early use of zero as a decimal figure.

The first known recorded use of zero as an integer dates to AD 628, and appeared in the Brāhmasphuṭasiddhānta, the main work of the Indian mathematician Brahmagupta. He is usually considered the first to formulate the mathematical concept of zero. Brahmagupta treated 0 as a number and discussed operations involving it, including division by zero. He gave rules of using zero with negative and positive numbers, such as "zero plus a positive number is a positive number, and a negative number plus zero is the negative number". By this time (the 7th century), the concept had clearly reached Cambodia in the form of Khmer numerals, and documentation shows the idea later spreading to China and the Islamic world. The concept began reaching Europe through Islamic sources around the year 1000.

There are other uses of zero before Brahmagupta, though the documentation is not as complete as it is in the Brāhmasphuṭasiddhānta. The earliest uses of zero was as simply a placeholder numeral in place-value systems, representing another number as was done by the Babylonians. Many ancient texts used 0, including Babylonian and Egyptian texts. Egyptians used the word nfr to denote zero balance in double entry accounting. Indian texts used a Sanskrit word Shunye or shunya to refer to the concept of void. In mathematics texts this word often refers to the number zero. In a similar vein, Pāṇini (5th century BC) used the null (zero) operator in the Ashtadhyayi, an early example of an algebraic grammar for the Sanskrit language (also see Pingala).

Records show that the Ancient Greeks seemed unsure about the status of 0 as a number: they asked themselves "How can 'nothing' be something?" leading to interesting philosophical and, by the Medieval period, religious arguments about the nature and existence of 0 and the vacuum. The paradoxes of Zeno of Elea depend in part on the uncertain interpretation of 0. (The ancient Greeks even questioned whether 1 was a number.)

The Maya numerals are an example of a base-20 numeral system.

The late Olmec people of south-central Mexico began to use a placeholder symbol for zero, a shell glyph, in the New World, by 38 BC. It would be the Maya who developed zero as a cardinal number, employing it in their numeral system and in the Maya calendar. Maya used a base 20 numerical system by combining a number of dots (base 5) with a number of bars (base 4). George I. Sánchez in 1961 reported a base 4, base 5 "finger" abacus.

By 130 AD, Ptolemy, influenced by Hipparchus and the Babylonians, was using a symbol for 0 (a small circle with a long overbar) within a sexagesimal numeral system otherwise using alphabetic Greek numerals. Because it was used alone, not as just a placeholder, this Hellenistic zero was the first documented use of a true zero in the Old World. In later Byzantine manuscripts of his Syntaxis Mathematica (Almagest), the Hellenistic zero had morphed into the Greek letter Omicron (otherwise meaning 70 in isopsephy).

A true zero was used in tables alongside Roman numerals by 525 (first known use by Dionysius Exiguus), but as a word, nulla meaning nothing, not as a symbol. When division produced 0 as a remainder, nihil, also meaning nothing, was used. These medieval zeros were used by all future medieval computists (calculators of Easter). An isolated use of their initial, N, was used in a table of Roman numerals by Bede or a colleague about 725, a true zero symbol.

=== Negative numbers ===
The abstract concept of negative numbers was recognized as early as 100–50 BC in China. The Nine Chapters on the Mathematical Art contains methods for finding the areas of figures; red rods were used to denote positive coefficients, black for negative. The first reference in a Western work was in the 3rd century AD in Greece. Diophantus referred to the equation equivalent to 4x + 20 = 0 (the solution is negative) in Arithmetica, saying that the equation gave an absurd result.

During the 600s, negative numbers were in use in India to represent debts. Diophantus' previous reference was discussed more explicitly by Indian mathematician Brahmagupta, in Brāhmasphuṭasiddhānta in 628, who used negative numbers to produce the general form quadratic formula that remains in use today. However, in the 12th century in India, Bhaskara gives negative roots for quadratic equations but says the negative value "is in this case not to be taken, for it is inadequate; people do not approve of negative roots".

European mathematicians, for the most part, resisted the concept of negative numbers until the 17th century, although Fibonacci allowed negative solutions in financial problems where they could be interpreted as debts (chapter 13 of Liber Abaci, 1202) and later as losses (in Flos). René Descartes called them false roots as they cropped up in algebraic polynomials yet he found a way to swap true roots and false roots as well. At the same time, the Chinese were indicating negative numbers by drawing a diagonal stroke through the right-most non-zero digit of the corresponding positive number's numeral. An early European experimenter with negative numbers was Nicolas Chuquet during the 15th century. He used them as exponents, but referred to them as "absurd numbers".

As recently as the 18th century, it was common practice to ignore any negative results returned by equations on the assumption that they were meaningless.

=== Rational numbers ===
Archimedes' method of confining the value of pi using the perimeters of circumscribed and inscribed polygons results in rational number estimates.

It is likely that the concept of fractional numbers dates to prehistoric times. The Ancient Egyptians used their Egyptian fraction notation for rational numbers in mathematical texts such as the Rhind Mathematical Papyrus and the Kahun Papyrus. The Rhind Papyrus includes an example of deriving the area of a circle from its diameter, which yields an estimate of π as $\bigl(\frac{16}{9}\bigr)^2$ ≈ 3.16049.... Classical Greek and Indian mathematicians made studies of the theory of rational numbers, as part of the general study of number theory. A particularly influential example of these is Euclid's Elements, dating to roughly 300 BC. Of the Indian texts, the most relevant is the Sthananga Sutra, which also covers number theory as part of a general study of mathematics.

The concept of decimal fractions is closely linked with decimal place-value notation; the two seem to have developed in tandem. For example, it is common for the Jain math sutra to include calculations of decimal-fraction approximations to pi or the square root of 2. Similarly, Babylonian math texts used sexagesimal (base 60) fractions.

=== Real numbers and irrational numbers ===
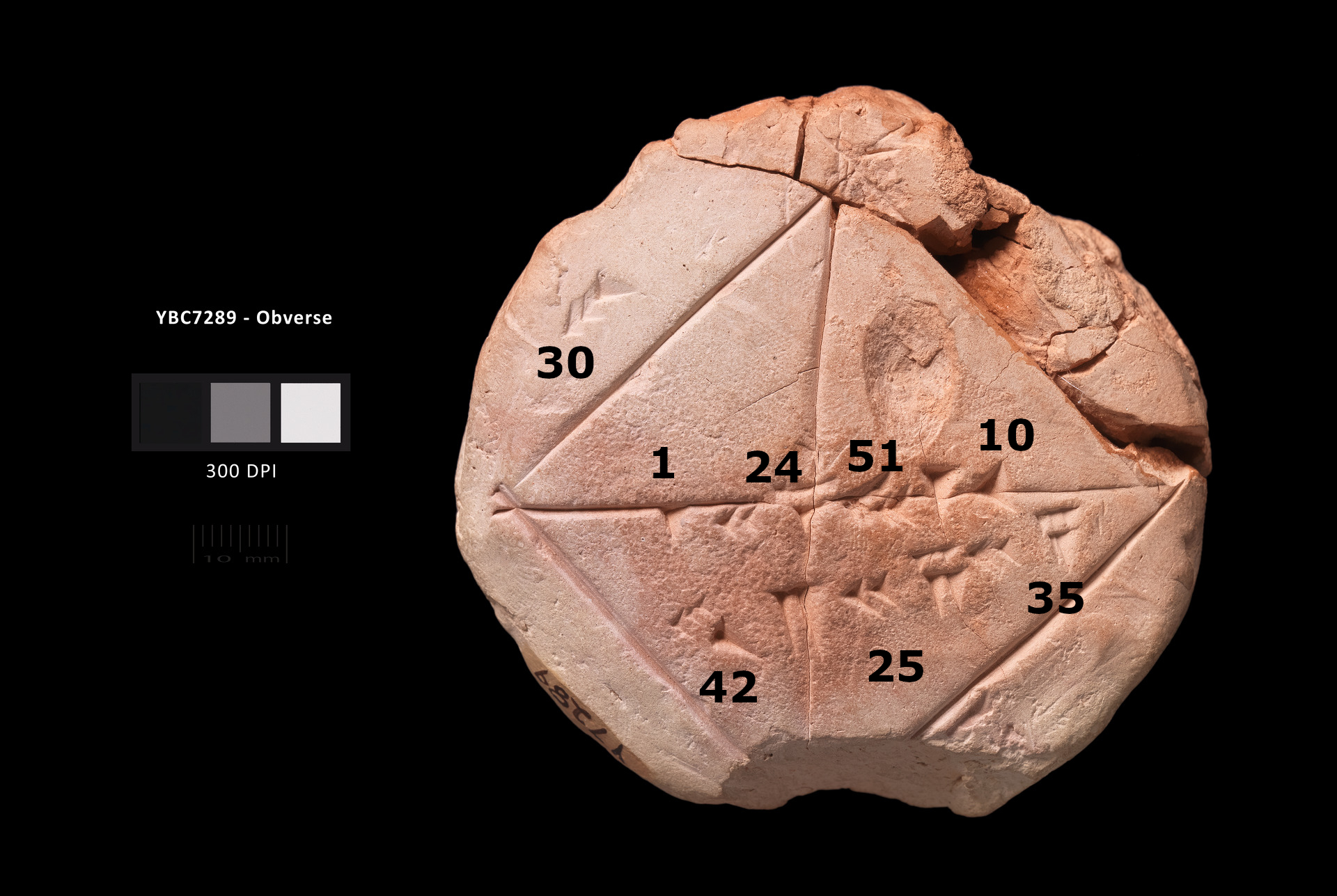
Babylonian clay tablet YBC 7289 showing the first four sexagesimal place values for an approximation of the square root of 2: 1 24 51 10

The Babylonians, as early as 1800 BCE, demonstrated numerical approximations of irrational quantities such as √2 on clay tablets, with an accuracy analogous to six decimal places, as in the tablet YBC 7289. These values were primarily used for practical calculations in geometry and land measurement. There were practical approximations of irrational numbers in the Indian Shulba Sutras composed between 800 and 500 BC.

The first existence proofs of irrational numbers is usually attributed to Pythagoras, more specifically to the Pythagorean Hippasus, who produced a (most likely geometrical) proof of the irrationality of the square root of 2. The story goes that Hippasus discovered irrational numbers when trying to represent the square root of 2 as a fraction. However, Pythagoras believed in the absoluteness of numbers. He could not disprove the existence of irrational numbers, or accept them, so according to legend, he sentenced Hippasus to death by drowning, to impede the spread of this unsettling news.

The 16th century brought final European acceptance of negative integers and fractional numbers. By the 17th century, mathematicians generally used decimal fractions with modern notation. The concept of real numbers was introduced in the 17th century by René Descartes. While studying compound interest, in 1683 Jacob Bernoulli found that as the compounding intervals grew ever shorter, the rate of exponential growth converged to a base of 2.71828...; this key mathematical constant would later be named Euler's number (e). Irrational numbers began to be studied systematically in the 18th century, with Leonhard Euler who proved that the irrational numbers are those numbers whose simple continued fractions is not finite and that Euler's number (e) is irrational. The irrationality of π was proved in 1761 by Johann Lambert.

It is in the second half of the 19th century that real numbers, and thus irrational numbers, were rigorously defined, with the work of Augustin-Louis Cauchy, Charles Méray (1869), Karl Weierstrass (1872), Eduard Heine (1872), Georg Cantor (1883), and Richard Dedekind (1872).

=== Transcendental numbers and reals ===
A transcendental number is a numerical value that is not the root of a polynomial with integer coefficients. This means it is not algebraic and thus excludes all rational numbers. The existence of transcendental numbers was first established by Liouville (1844, 1851). Hermite proved in 1873 that e is transcendental and Lindemann proved in 1882 that π is transcendental. Finally, Cantor showed that the set of all real numbers is uncountably infinite but the set of all algebraic numbers is countably infinite, so there is an uncountably infinite number of transcendental numbers.

=== Infinity and infinitesimals ===
In mathematics, infinity is considered an abstract concept rather than a number; instead of being "greater than any number", infinite is the property of having no end. The earliest known conception of mathematical infinity appears in the Yajurveda, an ancient Indian script, which at one point states, "If [the whole] was subtract from [the whole], the leftover will still be [the whole]". Infinity was a popular topic of philosophical study among the Jain mathematicians c. 400 BC. They distinguished between five types of infinity: infinite in one and two directions, infinite in area, infinite everywhere, and infinite perpetually.

Aristotle defined the traditional Western notion of mathematical infinity. He distinguished between actual infinity and potential infinity—the general consensus being that only the latter had true value. Galileo Galilei's Two New Sciences discussed the idea of one-to-one correspondences between infinite sets, known as Galileo's paradox. The next major advance in the theory was made by Georg Cantor; in 1895 he published a book about his new set theory, introducing, among other things, transfinite numbers and formulating the continuum hypothesis. The symbol $\text{∞}$, often used to represent an infinite quantity, was first introduced in a mathematical context by John Wallis in 1655.

In the 1960s, Abraham Robinson showed how infinitely large and infinitesimal numbers can be rigorously defined and used to develop the field of nonstandard analysis. The system of hyperreal numbers represents a rigorous method of treating the ideas about infinite and infinitesimal numbers that had been used casually by mathematicians, scientists, and engineers ever since the invention of infinitesimal calculus by Newton and Leibniz.

A modern geometrical version of infinity is given by projective geometry, which introduces "ideal points at infinity", one for each spatial direction. Each family of parallel lines in a given direction is postulated to converge to the corresponding ideal point. This is closely related to the idea of vanishing points in perspective drawing.

=== Complex numbers ===
The earliest fleeting reference to square roots of negative numbers occurred in the work of the mathematician and inventor Heron of Alexandria in the 1st century AD, when he considered the volume of an impossible frustum of a pyramid. They became more prominent when in the 16th century closed formulas for the roots of third and fourth degree polynomials were discovered by Italian mathematicians such as Niccolò Fontana Tartaglia and Gerolamo Cardano. It was soon realized that these formulas, even if one was only interested in real solutions, sometimes required the manipulation of square roots of negative numbers.

This was doubly unsettling since they did not even consider negative numbers to be on firm ground at the time. René Descartes is sometimes credited with coining the term "imaginary" for these quantities in 1637, intending it as derogatory. (See imaginary number for a discussion of the "reality" of complex numbers.) A further source of confusion was that the equation
$$\left ( \sqrt{-1}\right )^2 =\sqrt{-1}\sqrt{-1}=-1$$
seemed capriciously inconsistent with the algebraic identity
$$\sqrt{a}\sqrt{b}=\sqrt{ab},$$
which is valid for positive real numbers a and b, and was also used in complex number calculations with one of a, b positive and the other negative. The incorrect use of this identity, and the related identity
$$\frac{1}{\sqrt{a}}=\sqrt{\frac{1}{a}}$$
in the case when both a and b are negative even bedeviled Euler. This difficulty eventually led him to the convention of using the special symbol i in place of $\sqrt{-1}$ to guard against this mistake.

Argand diagram of Euler's formula in the complex plane, showing re[al] and im[aginary] coordinates

The 18th century saw the work of Abraham de Moivre and Leonhard Euler. De Moivre's formula (1730) states:
$$(\cos \theta + i\sin \theta)^{n} = \cos n \theta + i\sin n \theta$$
while Euler's formula of complex analysis (1748) gave us:
$$\cos \theta + i\sin \theta = e ^{i\theta }.$$
A special case of this formula yields Euler's identity:
$$e ^{i\pi} + 1 = 0$$
showing a profound connection between the most fundamental numbers in mathematics.

The existence of complex numbers was not completely accepted until Caspar Wessel described the geometrical interpretation in 1799. Carl Friedrich Gauss rediscovered and popularized it several years later, and as a result the theory of complex numbers received a notable expansion. However, the idea of the graphic representation of complex numbers had appeared as early as 1685, in Wallis's De algebra tractatus.

In the same year, Gauss provided the first generally accepted proof of the fundamental theorem of algebra, showing that every polynomial over the complex numbers has a full set of solutions in that realm. Gauss studied complex numbers of the form a + bi, where a and b are integers (now called Gaussian integers) or rational numbers. His student, Gotthold Eisenstein, studied the type a + bω, where ω is a complex root of x^{3} − 1 = 0 (now called Eisenstein integers). Other such classes (called cyclotomic fields) of complex numbers derive from the roots of unity x^{k} − 1 = 0 for higher values of k. This generalization is largely due to Ernst Kummer, who also invented ideal numbers, which were expressed as geometrical entities by Felix Klein in 1893.

In 1850 Victor Alexandre Puiseux took the key step of distinguishing between poles and branch points, and introduced the concept of essential singular points. This eventually led to the concept of the extended complex plane.

=== Prime numbers ===
Prime numbers may have been studied throughout recorded history. They are natural numbers that are not a product of two smaller natural numbers. It has been suggested that the Ishango bone includes a list of the prime numbers between 10 and 20. The Rhind papyrus display different forms for prime numbers. But the formal study of prime numbers is first documented by the ancient Greek. Euclid devoted one book of the Elements to the theory of primes; in it he proved the infinitude of the primes and the fundamental theorem of arithmetic, and presented the Euclidean algorithm for finding the greatest common divisor of two numbers.

In 240 BC, Eratosthenes used the Sieve of Eratosthenes to quickly isolate prime numbers. But most further development of the theory of primes in Europe dates to the Renaissance and later eras. At around 1000 AD, Ibn al-Haytham discovered Wilson's theorem. Ibn al-Banna' al-Marrakushi found a way to speed up the Sieve of Eratosthenes by only testing up to the square root of the number. Fibonacci communicated Islamic mathematical contributions to Europe, and in 1202 was the first to describe the method of trial division.

In 1796, Adrien-Marie Legendre conjectured the prime number theorem, describing the asymptotic distribution of primes. Other results concerning the distribution of the primes include Euler's proof that the sum of the reciprocals of the primes diverges, and the Goldbach conjecture, which claims that any sufficiently large even number is the sum of two primes. Yet another conjecture related to the distribution of prime numbers is the Riemann hypothesis, formulated by Bernhard Riemann in 1859. The prime number theorem was finally proved by Jacques Hadamard and Charles de la Vallée-Poussin in 1896. Goldbach and Riemann's conjectures remain unproven and unrefuted.

=== Cultural and symbolic significance ===
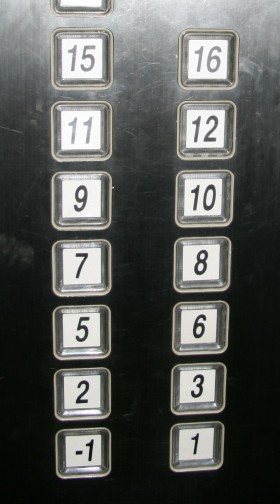
A Shanghai apartment is missing floors 0, 4, 13, and 14

Numbers have held cultural, symbolic and religious significance throughout history and in many cultures. In Ancient Greece, number symbolism heavily influenced the development of Greek mathematics, stimulating the investigation of many problems in number theory which are still of interest today. According to Plato, Pythagoreans attributed specific characteristics and meaning to particular numbers, and believed that "things themselves are numbers".

Folktales in different cultures exhibit preferences for particular numbers, with three and seven holding special significance in European culture, while four and five are more prominent in Chinese folktales. Numbers are sometimes associated with luck: in Western society, the number 13 is considered unlucky while in Chinese culture the number eight is considered auspicious.

== Main classification ==
Numbers can be classified into sets, called number sets or number systems, such as the natural numbers and the real numbers. The main number systems are as follows:

Main number systems
Symbol	Name	Examples/Explanation
$\mathbb{N}$	Natural numbers	0, 1, 2, 3, 4, 5, ... or 1, 2, 3, 4, 5, ... $\mathbb{N}_0$ or $\mathbb{N}_1$ are sometimes used.
$\mathbb{Z}$	Integers	..., −5, −4, −3, −2, −1, 0, 1, 2, 3, 4, 5, ...
$\mathbb{Q}$	Rational numbers	a/b where a and b are integers and b is not 0
$\mathbb{R}$	Real numbers	The limit of a convergent sequence of rational numbers
$\mathbb{C}$	Complex numbers	a + bi where a and b are real numbers and i is a formal square root of −1

Each of these number systems extends the preceding one. So, for example, a rational number is also a real number, and every real number is also a complex number. This chain of set inclusions can be expressed symbolically as:
$$\mathbb{N} \subset \mathbb{Z} \subset \mathbb{Q} \subset \mathbb{R} \subset \mathbb{C}.$$

Euler diagram of the number systems

=== Natural numbers ===
The natural numbers, starting with 1

The most familiar numbers are the natural numbers (sometimes called whole numbers or counting numbers): 1, 2, 3, and so on. Traditionally, the sequence of natural numbers started with 1 (0 was not even considered a number for the Ancient Greeks.) However, in the 19th century, set theorists and other mathematicians started including 0 (cardinality of the empty set, i.e. 0 elements, where 0 is thus the smallest cardinal number) in the set of natural numbers. Today, various mathematicians use the term to describe both sets, including 0 or not. The mathematical symbol for the set of all natural numbers is N, also written $\mathbb{N}$, and sometimes $\mathbb{N}_0$ or $\mathbb{N}_1$ when it is necessary to indicate whether the set should start with 0 or 1, respectively.

In the base 10 numeral system, in almost universal use today for mathematical operations, the symbols for natural numbers are written using ten digits: 0, 1, 2, 3, 4, 5, 6, 7, 8, and 9. The radix or base is the number of unique numerical digits, including zero, that a numeral system uses to represent numbers (for the decimal system, the radix is 10). In this base 10 system, the rightmost digit of a natural number has a place value of 1, and every other digit has a place value ten times that of the place value of the digit to its right.

In set theory, which is capable of acting as an axiomatic foundation for modern mathematics, natural numbers can be represented by classes of equivalent sets. For instance, the number 3 can be represented as the class of all sets that have exactly three elements. Alternatively, in Peano Arithmetic, the number 3 is represented as S(S(S(0))), where S is the "successor" function (i.e., 3 is the third successor of 0). Many different representations are possible; all that is needed to formally represent 3 is to inscribe a certain symbol or pattern of symbols three times.

=== Integers ===
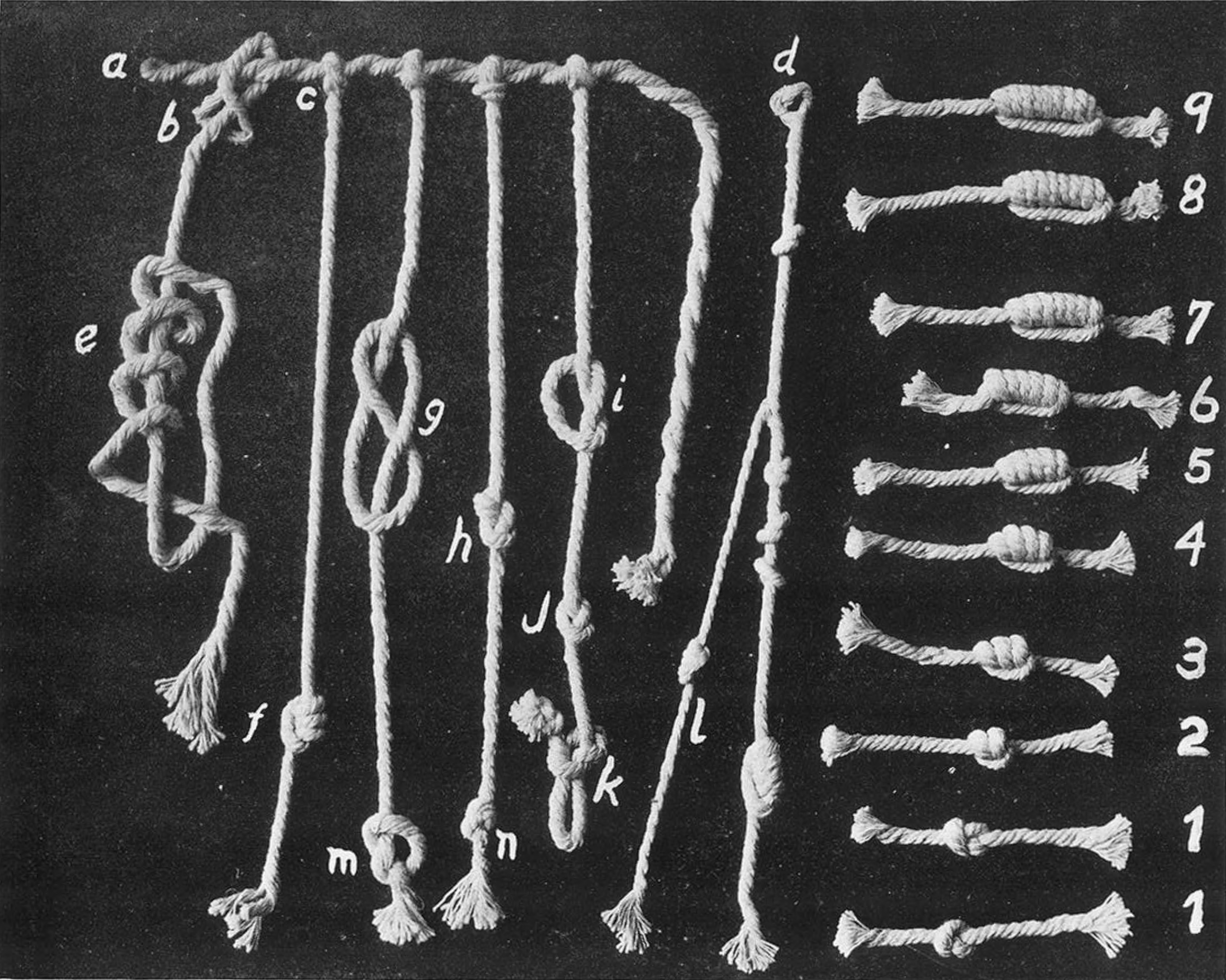
The Inca Empire used knotted strings, or quipus, for numerical records and other uses

The negative of a positive integer is defined as a number that produces 0 when it is added to the corresponding positive integer. Negative numbers are usually written with a negative sign (a minus sign). As an example, the negative of 7 is written −7, and 7 + (−7) = 0. When the set of negative numbers is combined with the set of natural numbers (including 0), the result is defined as the set of integers, Z also written $\mathbb{Z}$. Here the letter Z comes from German Zahl 'number'. The set of integers forms a ring with the operations addition and multiplication.

The natural numbers form a subset of the integers. As there is no common standard for the inclusion or not of zero in the natural numbers, the natural numbers without zero are commonly referred to as positive integers, and the natural numbers with zero are referred to as non-negative integers.

=== Rational numbers ===
A rational number is a number that can be expressed as a fraction with an integer numerator and a positive integer denominator. Negative denominators are allowed, but are commonly avoided, as every rational number is equal to a fraction with positive denominator. Fractions are written as two integers, the numerator and the denominator, with a dividing bar between them. The fraction m/n represents m parts of a whole divided into n equal parts. Two different fractions may correspond to the same rational number; for example 1/2 and 2/4 are equal, that is:
$${1 \over 2} = {2 \over 4}.$$

In general, (Note: This follows from the substitution property of equality, by multiplying both fractions with the product of their denominators: ${{b \times d}}$. Likewise, the converse is true by dividing with the product.)

${a \over b} = {c \over d}$ if and only if ${a \times d} = {c \times b}.$

If the absolute value of m is greater than n (supposed to be positive), then the absolute value of the fraction is greater than 1 and it is termed an improper or top-heavy fraction. Fractions can be greater than, less than, or equal to 1 and can also be positive, negative, or 0. The set of all rational numbers includes the integers since every integer can be written as a fraction with denominator 1. For example −7 can be written (−7)/1. The symbol for the rational numbers is Q (for quotient), also written $\mathbb{Q}$.

=== Real numbers ===
The symbol for the real numbers is R, also written as $\mathbb{R}.$ They include all the measuring numbers. Every real number corresponds to a point on the number line. The treatment of negative real numbers is according to the general rules of arithmetic and their denotation is simply prefixing the corresponding positive numeral by a minus sign, e.g. −123.456.

Each digit to the right of the decimal point has a place value one-tenth of the place value of the digit to its left. For example, 123.456 represents 123456/1000, or, in words, one hundred, two tens, three ones, four tenths, five hundredths, and six thousandths. A real number can be expressed by a finite number of decimal digits only if it is rational and its fractional part has a denominator whose prime factors are 2 or 5 or both, because these are the prime factors of 10, the base of the decimal system. Thus, for example, one half is 0.5, one fifth is 0.2, one-tenth is 0.1, and one fiftieth is 0.02.

==== Repeating decimal ====
If the fractional part of a real number has an infinite sequence of digits that follows a cyclical pattern, it can be written with an ellipsis or another notation that indicates the repeating pattern. Such a decimal is called a repeating decimal. Thus 3/11 can be written as 0.272727..., with an ellipsis to indicate that the pattern continues. Forever repeating 27s are also written as 0.2̅7̅. These recurring decimals, including the repetition of zeroes, denote exactly the rational numbers, i.e., all rational numbers are real numbers, but it is not the case that every real number is rational.

For a fractional part with a repeating decimal of consecutive nines, they may be replaced by incrementing the last digit before the nines. Thus, 3.7399999999... or 3.739̅ is equivalent to 3.74. A fractional part with an unlimited number of 0s can be rewritten by dropping the 0s to the right of the rightmost nonzero digit. Just as the same fraction can be written in more than one way, the same real number may have more than one decimal representation. For example, 0.999..., 1.0, 1.00, 1.000, ..., all represent the natural number 1.

==== Irrational numbers ====
For real numbers that are not rational numbers, representing them as decimals would require an infinite sequence of varying digits to the right of the decimal point. These real numbers are called irrational. A famous irrational real number is the π, the ratio of the circumference of any circle to its diameter. When pi is written as
$$\pi = 3.14159265358979\dots,$$
as it sometimes is, the ellipsis does not mean that the decimals repeat (they do not), but rather that there is no end to them. It has been proved that π is irrational. Another well-known number, proven to be an irrational real number, is
$$\sqrt{2} = 1.41421356237\dots,$$
the square root of 2, that is, the unique positive real number whose square is 2. Both these numbers have been approximated (by computer) to trillions ( 1 trillion = 10^{12} = 1,000,000,000,000 ) of digits.

Euclid's golden ratio, defined here by ${\color{OliveGreen}a + b}$ is to ${\color{Blue}a}$ as ${\color{Blue}a}$ is to ${\color{Red}b}$, is an irrational number 𝜙=1.61803… that tends to appear in many aspects of both art and science.

Almost all real numbers are irrational and therefore have no repeating patterns and hence no corresponding decimal numeral. They can only be approximated by decimal numerals, denoting rounded or truncated real numbers, in which a decimal point is placed to the right of the digit with place value 1. Any rounded or truncated number is necessarily a rational number, of which there are only countably many.

All measurements are, by their nature, approximations, and always have a margin of error. Thus 123.456 is considered an approximation of any real number in the interval:
$$\left[\tfrac{12345\mathit{55}}{10000}, \tfrac{12345\mathit{65}}{10000} \right)$$
when rounding to three decimals, or of any real number in the interval:
$$\left[\tfrac{123456}{1000}, \tfrac{123457}{1000} \right)$$
when truncating after the third decimal. Digits that suggest a greater accuracy than the measurement itself does, should be removed. The remaining digits are then called significant digits.

For example, measurements with a ruler can seldom be made without a margin of error of at least 0.001 m. If the sides of a rectangle are measured as 1.23 m and 4.56 m, then multiplication gives an area for the rectangle between 5.614591 m^{2} and 5.603011 m^{2}. Since not even the second digit after the decimal place is preserved, the subsequent digits are not significant. Therefore, the result is usually rounded to 5.61 m^{2}.

==== Set theory ====
The real numbers have an important but highly technical property called the least upper bound property.

It can be shown that any complete, ordered field is isomorphic to the real numbers. The real numbers are not, however, an algebraically closed field, because they do not include a solution (often called a square root of minus one) to the algebraic equation $x^2+1=0$.

=== Complex numbers ===
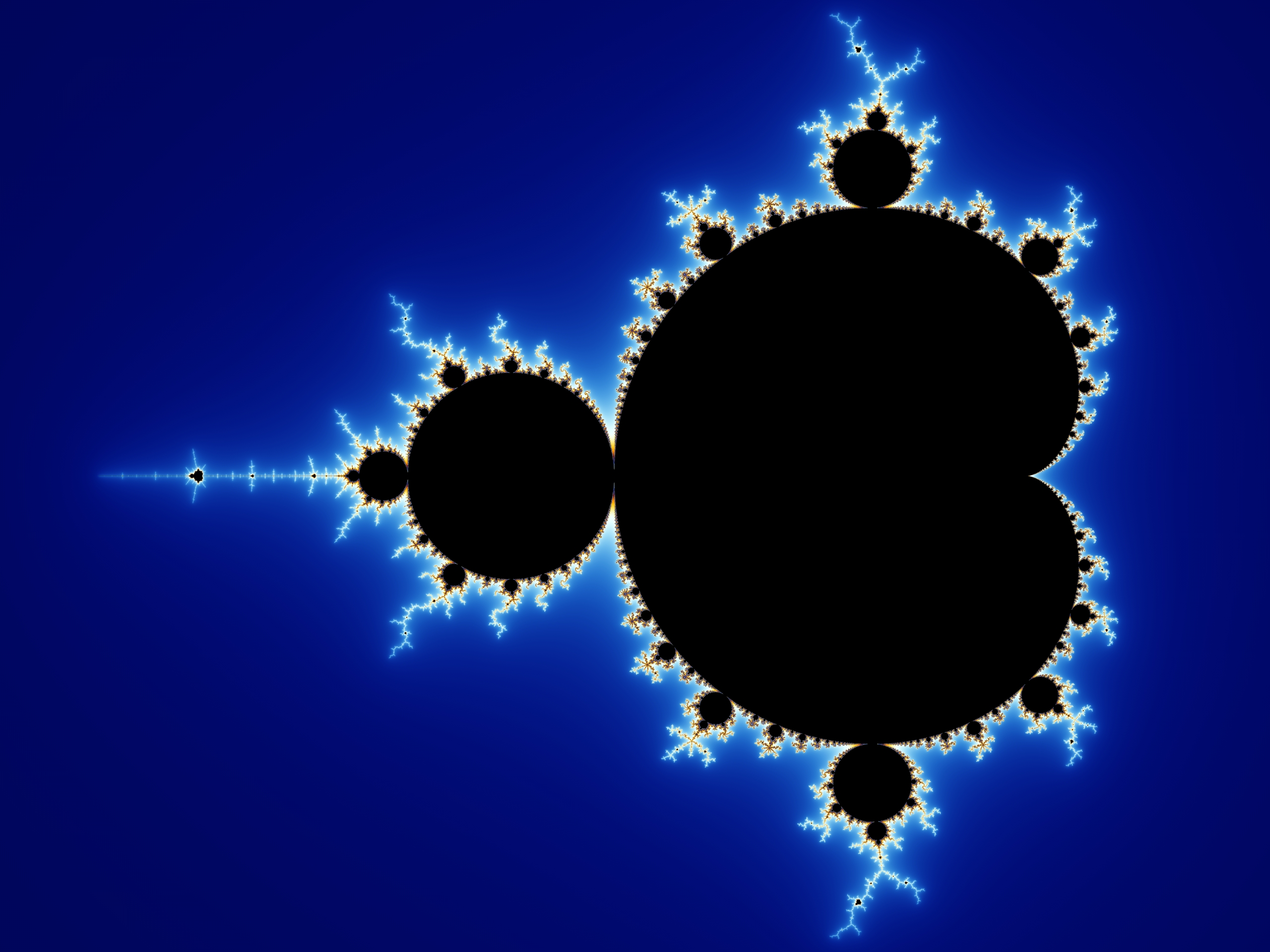
The Mandelbrot set is a fractal in the complex plane.

Moving to a greater level of abstraction, the real numbers can be extended to the complex numbers. The complete solution set of a polynomial of degree two or higher can include the square roots of negative numbers. (An example is $x^2+1=0$.) To conveniently represent this, the square root of −1 is denoted by i, a symbol assigned by Leonhard Euler called the imaginary unit. Hence, complex numbers consist of all values of the form:
$$\,a + b i$$
where a and b are real numbers. Because of this, complex numbers correspond to points on the complex plane, a vector space of two real dimensions. In the expression a + bi, the real number a is called the real part and b is called the imaginary part.

If the real part of a complex number is 0, then the number is called an imaginary number or is referred to as purely imaginary; if the imaginary part is 0, then the number is a real number. Thus the real numbers are a subset of the complex numbers. If the real and imaginary parts of a complex number are both integers, then the number is called a Gaussian integer. The symbol for the complex numbers is C or $\mathbb{C}$.

The fundamental theorem of algebra asserts that the complex numbers form an algebraically closed field, meaning that every polynomial with complex coefficients has a root in the complex numbers. Like the reals, the complex numbers form a field, which is complete, but unlike the real numbers, it is not ordered. That is, there is no consistent meaning assignable to saying that i is greater than 1, nor is there any meaning in saying that i is less than 1. In technical terms, the complex numbers lack a total order that is compatible with field operations.

Complex analysis is the branch of mathematical analysis that investigates functions of complex numbers. It is useful for the solution of physical problems, and is widely used in modern mathematics, engineering, and the sciences. Examples of applications include fluid dynamics, control theory, signal processing, number theory, and solving differential equations. Complex numbers appear to be a fundamental aspect of quantum mechanics; it can not be formulated using only real numbers.

== Subclasses of the integers ==
=== Even and odd numbers ===
An even number is an integer that is "evenly divisible" by two, that is divisible by two without remainder; an odd number is an integer that is not even. (The old-fashioned term "evenly divisible" is now almost always shortened to "divisible".) This property of an integer is called the parity. Any odd number n may be constructed by the formula n = 2k + 1, for a suitable integer k. Starting with k = 0, the first non-negative odd numbers are {1, 3, 5, 7, ...}. Any even number m has the form m = 2k where k is again an integer. Similarly, the first non-negative even numbers are {0, 2, 4, 6, ...}. The product of an even number with an integer is another even number; only the product of an odd number with an odd number is another odd number.

=== Prime numbers ===
Digits in largest known prime numbers by year since 1951

A prime number, often shortened to just prime, is an integer greater than 1 that is not the product of two smaller positive integers. The first few prime numbers are 2, 3, 5, 7, and 11. There is no such simple formula as for odd and even numbers to generate the prime numbers. A special class are the Mersenne primes, which are prime numbers of the form 2^{n} − 1, where n is a positive integer. These hold many records for the largest prime numbers discovered.

The study of primes have led to many questions, only some of which have been answered. The study of these questions belongs to number theory. Goldbach's conjecture is an example of a still unanswered question: "Is every even number the sum of two primes?" One answered question, as to whether every integer greater than one is a product of primes in only one way, except for a rearrangement of the primes, was confirmed; this proven claim is called the fundamental theorem of arithmetic. A proof appears in Euclid's Elements.

In the modern world, prime numbers have a number of important applications, including in public-key cryptography, digital signature, pseudorandom number generation, signal processing, and filtering data for digital image processing. Prime numbers are useful in hash tables and error detection codes (such as those used in ISBN and ISSN).

=== Other classes of integers ===
Many subsets of the natural numbers have been the subject of specific studies and have been named, often eponymously after the first mathematician that has studied them. Examples of such sets of integers are Bernoulli numbers, Fibonacci numbers, Lucas numbers, and perfect numbers. For more examples, see Integer sequence.

== Subclasses of the complex numbers ==
=== Algebraic, irrational and transcendental numbers ===
Algebraic numbers are those that are a solution to a polynomial equation with integer coefficients. Real numbers that are not rational numbers are called irrational numbers. Complex numbers which are not algebraic are called transcendental numbers. The algebraic numbers that are solutions of a monic polynomial equation with integer coefficients are called algebraic integers.

=== Periods and exponential periods ===
A period is a complex number that can be expressed as an integral of an algebraic function over an algebraic domain. The periods are a class of numbers which includes, alongside the algebraic numbers, many well known mathematical constants such as the number π. The set of periods form a countable ring and bridge the gap between algebraic and transcendental numbers.

The periods can be extended by permitting the integrand to be the product of an algebraic function and the exponential of an algebraic function. This gives another countable ring: the exponential periods. The number e as well as Euler's constant are exponential periods.

=== Constructible numbers ===
Motivated by the classical problems of constructions with straightedge and compass, the constructible numbers are those complex numbers whose real and imaginary parts can be constructed using straightedge and compass, starting from a given segment of unit length, in a finite number of steps. A related subject is origami numbers, which are points constructed through paper folding.

=== Computable numbers ===
A computable number, also known as recursive number, is a real number such that there exists an algorithm which, given a positive number n as input, produces the first n digits of the computable number's decimal representation. Equivalent definitions can be given using μ-recursive functions, Turing machines or λ-calculus. The computable numbers are stable for all usual arithmetic operations, including the computation of the roots of a polynomial, and thus form a real closed field that contains the real algebraic numbers.

The computable numbers may be viewed as the real numbers that may be exactly represented in a computer: a computable number is exactly represented by its first digits and a program for computing further digits. However, the computable numbers are rarely used in practice. One reason is that there is no algorithm for testing the equality of two computable numbers. More precisely, there cannot exist any algorithm which takes any computable number as an input, and decides in every case if this number is equal to zero or not.

The set of computable numbers has the same cardinality as the natural numbers. Therefore, almost all real numbers are non-computable. However, it is very difficult to produce explicitly a real number that is not computable.

== Extensions of the concept ==
=== p-adic numbers ===
The p-adic numbers may have infinitely long expansions to the left of the decimal point, in the same way that real numbers may have infinitely long expansions to the right. The number system that results depends on what base is used for the digits: any base is possible, but a prime number base provides the best mathematical properties. The set of the p-adic numbers contains the rational numbers, but is not contained in the complex numbers.

The elements of an algebraic function field over a finite field and algebraic numbers have many similar properties (see Function field analogy). Therefore, they are often regarded as numbers by number theorists. The p-adic numbers play an important role in this analogy.

=== Hypercomplex numbers ===
Higher dimensional number systems may be constructed from the real numbers $\mathbb{R}$ in a way that generalize the construction of the complex numbers. They are sometimes called hypercomplex numbers, and are not included in the set of complex numbers. They include the quaternions $\mathbb{H}$, introduced by Sir William Rowan Hamilton, in which multiplication is not commutative; the octonions $\mathbb{O}$, in which multiplication is not associative in addition to not being commutative; and the sedenions $\mathbb{S}$, in which multiplication is not alternative, neither associative nor commutative. The hypercomplex numbers include one real unit together with $2^n-1$ imaginary units, for which n is a non-negative integer. For example, quaternions can generally represented using the form:

$$a + b\,\mathbf i + c\,\mathbf j +d\,\mathbf k,$$

where the coefficients a, b, c, d are real numbers, and i, j, k are 3 different imaginary units.

Each hypercomplex number system is a subset of the next hypercomplex number system of double dimensions obtained via the Cayley–Dickson construction. For example, the 4-dimensional quaternions $\mathbb{H}$ are a subset of the 8-dimensional octonions $\mathbb{O}$, which are in turn a subset of the 16-dimensional sedenions $\mathbb{S}$, in turn a subset of the 32-dimensional trigintaduonions $\mathbb{T}$, and ad infinitum with $2^n$ dimensions, with n being any non-negative integer. Including the complex and real numbers and their subsets, this can be expressed symbolically as:
$$\mathbb{N} \subset \mathbb{Z} \subset \mathbb{Q} \subset \mathbb{R} \subset \mathbb{C} \subset \mathbb{H} \subset \mathbb{O} \subset \mathbb{S} \subset \mathbb{T} \subset \cdots$$

Alternatively, starting from the real numbers $\mathbb{R}$, which have zero complex units, this can be expressed as

$$\mathcal C_0 \subset \mathcal C_1 \subset \mathcal C_2 \subset \mathcal C_3 \subset \mathcal C_4 \subset \mathcal C_5 \subset \cdots \subset \mathcal C_n$$

with $\mathcal C_n$ containing $2^n$ dimensions.

Quaternions have proven particularly useful for computation of rotations in three dimensions. For example, they are used in control systems for rockets and aircraft, as well as for robotics, computer visualization, navigation, and animation. Octonions appear to have a deeper theoretical connection with physics, particularly in string theory, M-theory and supergravity.

=== Transfinite numbers ===
For dealing with infinite sets, the natural numbers have been generalized to the ordinal numbers and to the cardinal numbers. The former gives the ordering of the set, while the latter gives its size. For finite sets, both ordinal and cardinal numbers are identified with the natural numbers. In the infinite case, many ordinal numbers correspond to the same cardinal number.

=== Nonstandard numbers ===
Hyperreal numbers are used in non-standard analysis. The hyperreals, or nonstandard reals (usually denoted as *R), denote an ordered field that is a proper extension of the ordered field of real numbers R and satisfies the transfer principle. This principle allows true first-order statements about R to be reinterpreted as true first-order statements about *R.

Superreal and surreal numbers extend the real numbers by adding infinitesimally small numbers and infinitely large numbers, but still form fields.

== See also ==
- Concrete number
- List of numbers
- List of types of numbers
- List of books on history of number systems
- Mathematical constant – Fixed number that has received a name
- Numerical cognition
- Orders of magnitude
- Physical constant – Universal and unchanging physical quantity
- Physical quantity – Measurable property of a material or system
- Scalar (mathematics) – Elements of a field, e.g. real numbers, in the context of linear algebra
- Subitizing and counting
