= 930 (number) =

← 929	930	931 →
- List of numbers; Integers; ← 0 100 200 300 400 500 600 700 800 900 →
- Cardinal: nine hundred thirty
- Ordinal: 930th (nine hundred thirtieth)
- Factorization: 2 × 3 × 5 × 31
- Divisors: 1, 2, 3, 5, 6, 10, 15, 30, 31, 62, 93, 155, 186, 310, 465, 930
- Greek numeral: ϠΛ´
- Roman numeral: CMXXX, cmxxx
- Binary: 1110100010_{2}
- Ternary: 1021110_{3}
- Senary: 4150_{6}
- Octal: 1642_{8}
- Duodecimal: 656_{12}
- Hexadecimal: 3A2_{16}

930 (nine hundred [and] thirty) is the natural number following 929 and preceding 931.

== In Mathematics ==
- 930 is a pronic number.
- 930 is the sum of 11 consecutive integers, starting from 72 and ending with 83.

$930 = 72 + 73 + 74 + 75 + 76 + 77 + 78 + 79 + 80 + 81 + 82 + 83$

- 930 is an abundant number. With it's proper divisors add up to 1374 $>$ 930.

== In Religion ==
In Christianity, Adam lived up to 930 years according to Genesis 5:5: "Altogether, Adam lived a total of 930 years, and then he died.".
