= Centered cube number =

Centered figurate number that counts points in a three-dimensional pattern

- 35 points in a body-centered cubic lattice, forming two cubical layers around a central point.
- Total no. of terms: Infinity
- Subsequence of: Polyhedral numbers
- Formula: $n^3 + (n + 1)^3$
- First terms: 1, 9, 35, 91, 189, 341, 559
- OEIS index: A005898; Centered cube

A centered cube number is a centered figurate number that counts the points in a three-dimensional pattern formed by a point surrounded by concentric cubical layers of points, with i^{2} points on the square faces of the ith layer. Equivalently, it is the number of points in a body-centered cubic pattern within a cube that has n + 1 points along each of its edges.

The first few centered cube numbers are

1, 9, 35, 91, 189, 341, 559, 855, 1241, 1729, 2331, 3059, 3925, 4941, 6119, 7471, 9009, ... (sequence A005898 in the OEIS).

== Formulas ==
The centered cube number for a pattern with n concentric layers around the central point is given by the formula

$$n^3 + (n + 1)^3 = (2n+1)\left(n^2+n+1\right).$$

The same number can also be expressed as a trapezoidal number (difference of two triangular numbers), or a sum of consecutive numbers, as

$$\binom{(n+1)^2+1}{2}-\binom{n^2+1}{2} = (n^2+1)+(n^2+2)+\cdots+(n+1)^2.$$

== Properties ==
Because of the factorization (2n + 1)(n^{2} + n + 1), it is impossible for a centered cube number to be a prime number. The only centered cube numbers which are also the square numbers are 1 and 9, which can be shown by solving x^{2} = y^{3} + 3y , the only integer solutions being (x,y) from {(0,0), (1,2), (3,6), (12,42)}, By substituting a=(x-1)/2 and b=y/2, we obtain x^2=2y^3+3y^2+3y+1. This gives only (a,b) from {(-1/2,0), (0,1), (1,3), (11/2,21)} where a,b are half-integers.

== See also ==
- Cube number
