= 7744 =

← 7743	7744	7745 →
- List of numbers; Integers; ← 0 1k 2k 3k 4k 5k 6k 7k 8k 9k →
- Cardinal: seven thousand seven hundred forty-four
- Ordinal: 7744th (seven thousand seven hundred forty-fourth)
- Factorization: 2^{6} × 11^{2}
- Divisors: 2, 4, 8, 11, 16, 22, 32, 44, 64, 88, 121, 176, 242, 352, 484, 704, 968, 1,936, 3,872
- Greek numeral: ,ΖΨΜΔ´
- Roman numeral: V̅MMDCCXLIV, or V̅I̅I̅DCCXLIV
- Binary: 1111001000000_{2}
- Ternary: 101121211_{3}
- Senary: 55504_{6}
- Octal: 17100_{8}
- Duodecimal: 4594_{12}
- Hexadecimal: 1E40_{16}

7744 is the natural number following 7743 and preceding 7745.

== In mathematics ==
7744 is:

- the square of 88, and is the smallest nonzero square each of whose decimal digits occur exactly twice.
- a Harshad number in bases 5, 9, 10, 12, 14 and 15.
- the aliquot sum of both 10316 and 15482.
