= 399th =

399th may refer to:

- 399th Bombardment Group, inactive United States Air Force unit
- 399th Bombardment Squadron or 99th Air Refueling Squadron, part of the 6th Air Mobility Wing at Birmingham Air National Guard Base, Alabama
- 399th Fighter Squadron or 57th Weather Reconnaissance Squadron, inactive United States Air Force Reserve squadron

== See also ==
- 399 (number)
- 399, the year 399 (CCCXCIX) of the Julian calendar
- 399 BC
