= List of types of numbers =

Numbers can be classified according to how they are represented or according to the properties that they have.

== Main types ==
- Natural numbers ($\mathbb{N}$): The counting numbers {1, 2, 3, ...} are commonly called natural numbers; however, other definitions include 0, so that the non-negative integers {0, 1, 2, 3, ...} are also called natural numbers. Natural numbers including 0 are also sometimes called whole numbers. Alternatively natural numbers not including 0 are also sometimes called whole numbers instead.
- Integers ($\mathbb{Z}$): Positive and negative counting numbers, as well as zero: {..., −3, −2, −1, 0, 1, 2, 3, ...}.
- Rational numbers ($\mathbb{Q}$): Numbers that can be expressed as a ratio of an integer to a non-zero integer. All integers are rational, but there are rational numbers that are not integers, such as −2/9.
- Real numbers ($\mathbb{R}$): Numbers that correspond to points along a line. They can be positive, negative, or zero. All rational numbers are real, but the converse is not true.
- Irrational numbers ($\mathbb{R} \setminus \mathbb{Q}$): Real numbers that are not rational.
- Imaginary numbers: Numbers that equal the product of a real number and the imaginary unit $i$, where $i^2 = -1$. The number 0 is both real and imaginary.
- Complex numbers ($\mathbb{C}$): Includes real numbers, imaginary numbers, and sums and differences of real and imaginary numbers.
- Hypercomplex numbers include various number-system extensions: quaternions ($\mathbb{H}$), octonions ($\mathbb{O}$), sedenions ($\mathbb{S}$), trigintaduonions ($\mathbb{T}$), and other hypercomplex numbers of dimensions 64 and greater. Less common variants include as bicomplex numbers, coquaternions, and biquaternions.
- p-adic numbers: Various number systems constructed using limits of rational numbers, according to notions of "limit" different from the one used to construct the real numbers.

== Number representations ==
- Decimal: The standard Hindu–Arabic numeral system using base ten.
- Binary: The base-two numeral system used by computers, with digits 0 and 1.
- Ternary: The base-three numeral system with 0, 1, and 2 as digits.
- Quaternary: The base-four numeral system with 0, 1, 2, and 3 as digits.
- Hexadecimal: Base 16, widely used by computer system designers and programmers, as it provides a more human-friendly representation of binary-coded values.
- Octal: Base 8, occasionally used by computer system designers and programmers.
- Duodecimal: Base 12, a numeral system that is convenient because of the many factors of 12.
- Sexagesimal: Base 60, first used by the ancient Sumerians in the 3rd millennium BC, was passed down to the ancient Babylonians.
- See positional notation for information on other bases.
- Roman numerals: The numeral system of ancient Rome, still occasionally used today, mostly in situations that do not require arithmetic operations.
- Tally marks: Usually used for counting things that increase by small amounts and do not change very quickly.
- Fractions: A representation of a non-integer as a ratio of two integers. These include improper fractions as well as mixed numbers.
- Continued fraction: An expression obtained through an iterative process of representing a number as the sum of its integer part and the reciprocal of another number, then writing this other number as the sum of its integer part and another reciprocal, and so on.
- Scientific notation: A method for writing very small and very large numbers using powers of 10. When used in science, such a number also conveys the precision of measurement using significant figures.
- Knuth's up-arrow notation and Conway chained arrow notation: Notations that allow the concise representation of some extremely large integers such as Graham's number.

== Signed numbers ==
- Positive numbers: Real numbers that are greater than zero.
- Negative numbers: Real numbers that are less than zero. Because zero itself has no sign, neither the positive numbers nor the negative numbers include zero. When zero is a possibility, the following terms are often used:
- Non-negative numbers: Real numbers that are greater than or equal to zero. Thus a non-negative number is either zero or positive.
- Non-positive numbers: Real numbers that are less than or equal to zero. Thus a non-positive number is either zero or negative.

== Types of integers ==
- Even and odd numbers: An integer is even if it is a multiple of 2, and is odd otherwise.
- Prime number: A positive integer with exactly two positive divisors: itself and 1. The primes form an infinite sequence 2, 3, 5, 7, 11, 13, 17, 19, 23, 29, 31, ...
- Composite number: A positive integer that can be factored into a product of smaller positive integers. Every integer greater than one is either prime or composite.
- Polygonal numbers: These are numbers that can be represented as dots that are arranged in the shape of a regular polygon, including Triangular numbers, Square numbers, Pentagonal numbers, Hexagonal numbers, Heptagonal numbers, Octagonal numbers, Nonagonal numbers, Decagonal numbers, Hendecagonal numbers, and Dodecagonal numbers.
- There are many other famous integer sequences, such as the sequence of Fibonacci numbers, the sequence of Lucas numbers, the sequence of factorials, the sequence of perfect numbers, and so forth, many of which are enumerated in the On-Line Encyclopedia of Integer Sequences.

== Algebraic numbers ==
- Algebraic number: Any number that is the root of a non-zero polynomial with rational coefficients.
- Transcendental number: Any real or complex number that is not algebraic. Examples include e and π.
- Trigonometric number: Any number that is the sine or cosine of a rational multiple of π.
- Quadratic surd: A root of a quadratic equation with rational coefficients. Such a number is algebraic and can be expressed as the sum of a rational number and the square root of a rational number.
- Constructible number: A number representing a length that can be constructed using a compass and straightedge. Constructible numbers form a subfield of the field of algebraic numbers, and include the quadratic surds.
- Algebraic integer: A root of a monic polynomial with integer coefficients.

== Non-standard numbers ==
- Transfinite numbers: Numbers that are greater than any natural number.
- Ordinal numbers: Finite and infinite numbers used to describe the order type of well-ordered sets.
- Cardinal numbers: Finite and infinite numbers used to describe the cardinalities of sets.
- Infinitesimals: These are smaller than any positive real number, but are nonetheless greater than zero. These were used in the initial development of calculus, and are used in synthetic differential geometry.
- Hyperreal numbers: The numbers used in non-standard analysis. These include infinite and infinitesimal numbers which possess certain properties of the real numbers.
- Surreal numbers: A number system that includes the hyperreal numbers as well as the ordinals.
- Fuzzy numbers: A generalization of the real numbers, in which each element is a connected set of possible values with weights.

== Computability and definability ==
- Computable number: A real number whose digits can be computed by some algorithm.
- Period: A number which can be computed as the integral of some algebraic function over an algebraic domain.
- Definable number: A real number that can be defined uniquely using a first-order formula with one free variable in the language of set theory.

== See also ==
- Almost integer
- Scalar (mathematics)
