= 728 (number) =

← 727	728	729 →
- List of numbers; Integers; ← 0 100 200 300 400 500 600 700 800 900 →
- Cardinal: seven hundred twenty-eight
- Ordinal: 728th (seven hundred twenty-eighth)
- Factorization: 2^{3} × 7 × 13
- Divisors: 1, 2, 728
- Greek numeral: ΨΚΗ´
- Roman numeral: DCCXXVIII, dccxxviii
- Binary: 1011011000_{2}
- Ternary: 222222_{3}
- Senary: 3212_{6}
- Octal: 1330_{8}
- Duodecimal: 508_{12}
- Hexadecimal: 2D8_{16}

728 (seven hundred [and] twenty-eight) is the natural number and integer following 727 and preceding 729.

== In mathematics ==
728 is a nontotient, and a Smith number. There are 728 cubes of edge length 1 required to make a hollow cube of edge length 12. There are 728 connected graphs on 5 labelled vertices.

728!! - 1 is prime, and 728^{64} + 1 is also prime.

=== Cabtaxi number ===
A number is considered a cabtaxi number if the n-th cabtaxi number is defined as the smallest positive integer that can be written as the sum of two positive, negative or zero cubes in n ways.

The number 728 satisfies this because 728 is able to be written as the sum of two positive, negative, and zero cubes in 3 distinct ways:

$$\begin{align}
& 6^3 + 8^3 \\
& 9^3 - 1^3 \\
& 12^3 - 10^3 \\
\end{align}$$

This indicates that 728 is a cabtaxi number, specifically the third one.
