= 786 (number) =

← 785	786	787 →
- List of numbers; Integers; ← 0 100 200 300 400 500 600 700 800 900 →
- Cardinal: seven hundred eighty-six
- Ordinal: 786th (seven hundred eighty-sixth)
- Factorization: 2 × 3 × 131
- Greek numeral: ΨΠϚ´
- Roman numeral: DCCLXXXVI, dcclxxxvi
- Binary: 1100010010_{2}
- Ternary: 1002010_{3}
- Senary: 3350_{6}
- Octal: 1422_{8}
- Duodecimal: 556_{12}
- Hexadecimal: 312_{16}

786 (seven hundred [and] eighty-six) is the natural number following 785 and preceding 787.

== In mathematics ==
786 is:

- a sphenic number.
- a harshad number in bases 4, 5, 7, 14 and 16.
- the aliquot sum of 510.
- part of the 321329-aliquot tree. The complete aliquot sequence starting at 498 is: 498, 510, 786, 798, 1122, 1470, 2634, 2646, 4194, 4932, 7626, 8502, 9978, 9990, 17370, 28026, 35136, 67226, 33616, 37808, 40312, 35288, 37072, 45264, 79728, 146448, 281166, 281178, 363942, 424638, 526338, 722961, 321329, 1, 0

786 might be the largest n for which the value of the central binomial coefficient ${}_{2n}\!C_n$ is not divisible by an odd prime squared. If there is a larger such number, it would have to be at least 157450 (see OEIS: A059097).

== In islam ==
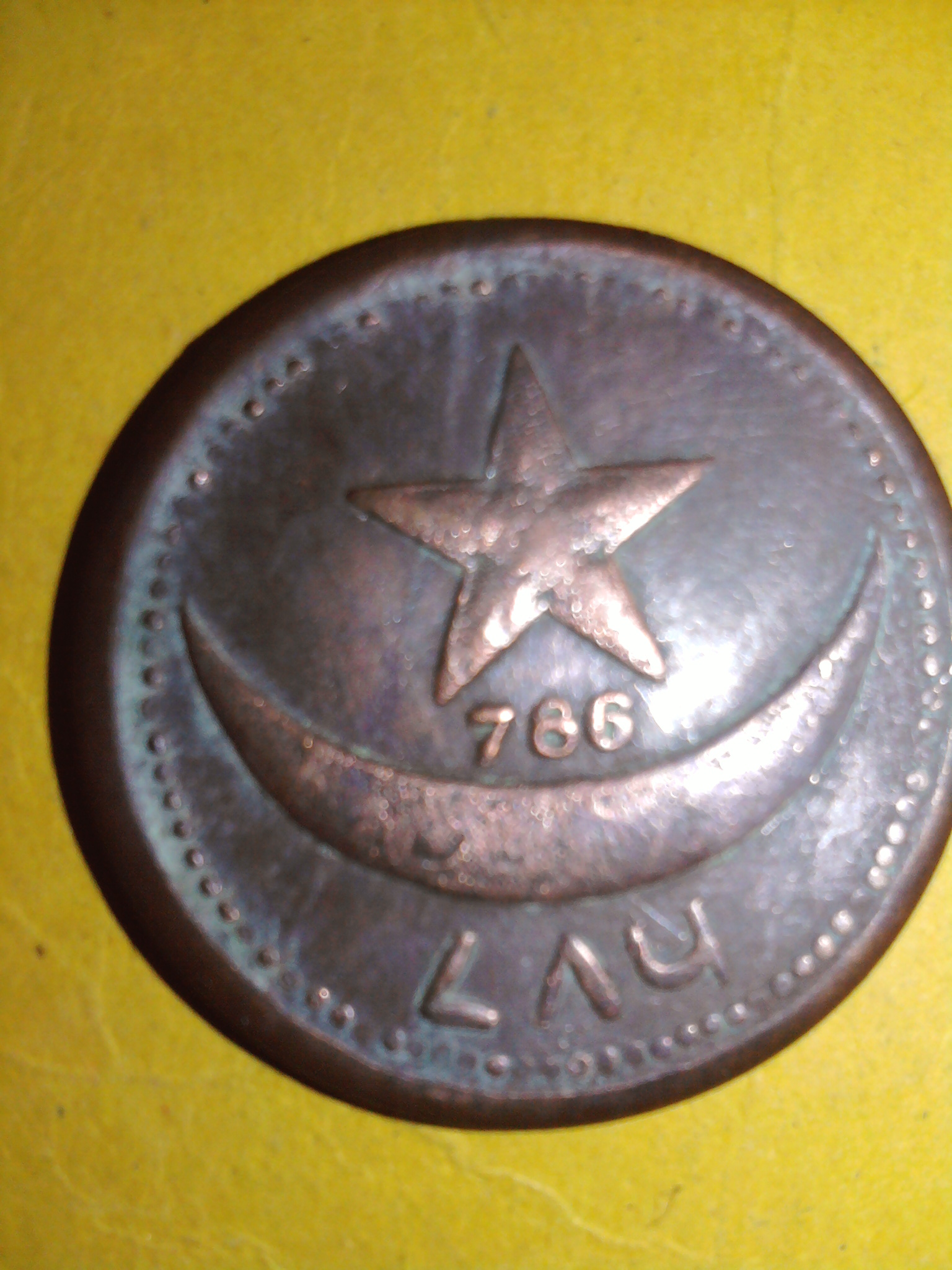
Ancient Indian coin from the Nawab period, with the Islamic crescent symbol and the inscription "786"

Indian Muslims associate the number with the basmala by summing up of all the numerical values of each Arabic letter making up the phrase. This auspiciousness has led it to often feature in films from the country.

- Vijay Verma's (Amitabh Bachchan) coolie number in the 1975 Hindi film Deewaar.
  - Raja's (Rajnikanth) coolie number in the 1981 Tamil film Thee, a remake of Deewaar.
- Iqbal Khan's (Amitabh Bachchan) coolie number in the 1983 Hindi film Coolie.
  - Bachchan has indicated that he believes the number is auspicious, as he survived a serious injury while wearing this number during the shooting of Coolie.
- Chiranjeevi sported this number in the 1988 Telugu film Khaidi No.786.
- Veer Pratap Singh's (Shahrukh Khan) prisoner number in the 2004 Hindi film Veer-Zaara.
- Sultan's (Ajay Devgan) car in the 2010 Hindi film Once Upon a Time in Mumbaai bears the registration number MRH 786.
- In the 2011 Tamil film Mankatha, in the scene where Vinayak Mahadev (Ajith Kumar) shoots Prem (Premgi Amaren), Prem wears a gold plate on his chest with the number 786 written on it.
- Ashish R Mohan's 2012 Hindi film Khiladi 786 features Akshay Kumar in the title role. The same film was released in Pakistan without the number 786.
