= 693 (number) =

← 692	693	694 →
- List of numbers; Integers; ← 0 100 200 300 400 500 600 700 800 900 →
- Cardinal: six hundred ninety-three
- Ordinal: 693rd (six hundred ninety-third)
- Factorization: 3^{2} × 7 × 11
- Divisors: 1, 3, 7, 9, 11, 21, 33, 63, 77, 99, 231, 693
- Greek numeral: ΧϞΓ´
- Roman numeral: DCXCIII, dcxciii
- Binary: 1010110101_{2}
- Ternary: 221200_{3}
- Senary: 3113_{6}
- Octal: 1265_{8}
- Duodecimal: 499_{12}
- Hexadecimal: 2B5_{16}

693 (six hundred [and] ninety-three) is the natural number following 692 and preceding 694.

== In mathematics ==
693 has twelve divisors: 1, 3, 7, 9, 11, 21, 33, 63, 77, 99, 231, and 693. Thus, 693 is tied with 315, 495, 525, 585, 675, 735, 765, 819, 825, and 855 for the highest number of divisors for any odd natural number below 900.

693 appears as the first three digits after the decimal point in the decimal form for the natural logarithm of 2. To 10 digits, this number is 0.6931471805. As a result, if an event has a constant probability of 0.1% of occurring, 693 is the smallest number of trials that must be performed for there to be at least a 50% chance that the event occurs at least once. More generally, for any probability p, the probability that the event occurs at least once in a sample of n items, assuming the items are independent, is given by the following formula:

$$1 - (1 - p)^n$$

For p = 10^{−3} = 0.001, plugging in n = 692 gives, to four decimal places, 0.4996, while n = 693 yields 0.5001.

693 is a palindrome in bases 6, 32, 62, 76, 98, 230, and 692. It is also a palindrome in binary: 1010110101.

693 is a triangular matchstick number.

== Sources ==
- De Koninck, Jean-Marie (2009). Those Fascinating Numbers. American Mathematical Society. p. 101. ISBN 978-0-8218-4807-4.
- Mathematical Association of America (2012-11-05). "693". NumberADay.
