= Prime constant =

Real number whose nth binary digit is 1 if n is prime and 0 if n is composite or 1

The prime constant is the real number $\rho$ whose $n$th binary digit is 1 if $n$ is prime and 0 if $n$ is composite or 1.

In other words, $\rho$ is the number whose binary expansion corresponds to the indicator function of the set of prime numbers. That is,

$$\rho = \sum_{p} \frac{1}{2^p} = \sum_{n=1}^\infty \frac{\chi_{\mathbb{P}}(n)}{2^n}$$

where $p$ indicates a prime and $\chi_{\mathbb{P}}$ is the characteristic function of the set $\mathbb{P}$ of prime numbers.

The beginning of the decimal expansion of ρ is: $\rho = 0.414682509851111660248109622\ldots$ (sequence A051006 in the OEIS)

The beginning of the binary expansion is: $\rho = 0.011010100010100010100010000\ldots_2$ (sequence A010051 in the OEIS)

== Irrationality ==
The number $\rho$ is irrational.

=== Proof by contradiction ===
Suppose $\rho$ were rational.

Denote the $k$th digit of the binary expansion of $\rho$ by $r_k$. Then since $\rho$ is assumed rational, its binary expansion is eventually periodic, and so there exist positive integers $N$ and $k$ such that $r_n = r_{n+ik}$ for all $n > N$ and all $i \in \mathbb{N}$.

Since there are an infinite number of primes, we may choose a prime $p > N$. By definition we see that $r_p=1$. As noted, we have $r_p=r_{p+ik}$ for all $i \in \mathbb{N}$. Now consider the case $i=p$. We have $r_{p+i \cdot k}=r_{p+p \cdot k}=r_{p(k+1)}=0$, since $p(k+1)$ is composite because $k+1 \geq 2$. Since $r_p \neq r_{p(k+1)}$ we see that $\rho$ is irrational.
