= 341 (number) =

← 340	341	342 →
- List of numbers; Integers; ← 0 100 200 300 400 500 600 700 800 900 →
- Cardinal: three hundred forty one
- Ordinal: 341st (three hundred forty-first)
- Factorization: 11 × 31
- Divisors: 1, 11, 31, 341
- Greek numeral: ΤΜΑ´
- Roman numeral: CCCXLI
- Binary: 101010101_{2}
- Ternary: 110122_{3}
- Senary: 1325_{6}
- Octal: 525_{8}
- Duodecimal: 245_{12}
- Hexadecimal: 155_{16}

341 (three hundred [and] forty-one) is the natural number following 340 and preceding 342.

== In mathematics ==
341 is an octagonal number, a centered cube number and a super-Poulet number. It is the sum of seven consecutive primes (37 + 41 + 43 + 47 + 53 + 59 + 61). 341 is a palindrome and repdigit in bases 2, 4, 8, 17 and 30 (101010101_{2}, 11111_{4}, 525_{8}, 131_{17}, BB_{30}).

341 is the smallest Fermat pseudoprime; it is the least composite odd modulus m greater than the base b, that satisfies the Fermat property "b^{m}^{−1} − 1 is divisible by m", for bases up to 128 of b = 2, 15, 60, 63, 78, and 108.
