= 318 (number) =

Natural number

← 317	318	319 →
- List of numbers; Integers; ← 0 100 200 300 400 500 600 700 800 900 →
- Cardinal: three hundred eighteen
- Ordinal: 318th (three hundred eighteenth)
- Factorization: 2 × 3 × 53
- Greek numeral: ΤΙΗ´
- Roman numeral: CCCXVIII, cccxviii
- Binary: 100111110_{2}
- Ternary: 102210_{3}
- Senary: 1250_{6}
- Octal: 476_{8}
- Duodecimal: 226_{12}
- Hexadecimal: 13E_{16}

318 (three hundred [and] eighteen) is the natural number following 317 and preceding 319. It has significance in Judaism and Christianity.

== In Mathematics ==
The number 318 has the proper divisors 1, 2, 3, 6, 53, 106, and 159. It is an abundant number, a sphenic number, and a nontotient. There are 318 posets with 6 unlabeled elements. 318 is the number of free polyaboloes composed of 7 triangles, and the harary index of the 8x8 white and black bishop graph.

== In Religion ==
The number 318 holds some significance in Judeo-Christian traditions and history. In the Talmud, scholars interpret the number as a literal reference to the faithful servant, Eliezer. Using gematria (a Jewish alphanumeric code), the Hebrew letters in Eliezer’s name add up to 318.

In Greek numerals, 318 is written as τιη. The letter Tau (τ) is interpreted as resembling the cross and the letters Iota (ι) and Eta (η) represent Jesus Christ as the first two letters in his name in Greek, Ἰησοῦς

In early Christian history, the First Council of Nicaea is traditionally recorded as having exactly 318 bishops in attendance. Additionally, in Genesis 14, Abram (later Abraham) leads a rescue mission for his nephew Lot with exactly 318 trained men.

== In other fields ==
318 is a predicted magic number for neutrons.
