= 777 (number) =

← 776	777	778 →
- List of numbers; Integers; ← 0 100 200 300 400 500 600 700 800 900 →
- Cardinal: seven hundred seventy-seven
- Ordinal: 777th (seven hundred seventy-seventh)
- Factorization: 3 × 7 × 37
- Greek numeral: ΨΟΖ´
- Roman numeral: DCCLXXVII, dcclxxvii
- Greek prefix: ἑπτακόσιοι ἑβδομήκοντα ἑπτά heptakósioi hebdomḗkonta heptá
- Latin prefix: septigenti septuaginta septem
- Binary: 1100001001_{2}
- Ternary: 1001210_{3}
- Senary: 3333_{6}
- Octal: 1411_{8}
- Duodecimal: 549_{12}
- Hexadecimal: 309_{16}

777 (seven hundred [and] seventy-seven) is the natural number following 776 and preceding 778. The number 777 is significant in numerous religious, cultural, and political contexts.

== In mathematics ==
777 is an odd, composite number. It is also an extravagant number, a lucky number, a polite number, and a deficient number. 777 is a congruent number, as it is possible to make a right triangle with rationally numbered side lengths whose area is 777.

== Religious significance ==
According to the Bible, Lamech, the father of Noah, lived for 777 years.

The number refers to a triumph of "God's number" 7 over the number of the beast.

=== Thelema ===
777 is an important number in new religious movement thelema.

== Political significance ==
=== Afrikaner Weerstandsbeweging ===
The Afrikaner Resistance Movement (Afrikaner Weerstandsbeweging, AWB), a Boer-nationalist, neo-Nazi, and white supremacist movement in South Africa, used the number 777 as part of their emblem.

== Gambling and luck ==
777 is used on most slot machines in the United States to identify a jackpot. As it is considered a lucky number, banknotes with a serial number containing 777 tend to be valued by collectors and numismatists. The US Mint and the Bureau of Engraving and Printing sells uncirculated 777 $1 bills for this reason.
