= 840 (number) =

← 839	840	841 →
- List of numbers; Integers; ← 0 100 200 300 400 500 600 700 800 900 →
- Cardinal: eight hundred forty
- Ordinal: 840th (eight hundred fortieth)
- Factorization: 2^{3} × 3 × 5 × 7
- Divisors: 1, 2, 3, 4, 5, 6, 7, 8, 10, 12, 14, 15, 20, 21, 24, 28, 30, 35, 40, 42, 56, 60, 70, 84, 105, 120, 140, 168, 210, 280, 420, 840
- Greek numeral: ΩΜ´
- Roman numeral: DCCCXL, dcccxl
- Binary: 1101001000_{2}
- Ternary: 1011010_{3}
- Senary: 3520_{6}
- Octal: 1510_{8}
- Duodecimal: 5A0_{12}
- Hexadecimal: 348_{16}

840 (eight hundred [and] forty) is the natural number following 839 and preceding 841 numerically.

== Mathematical properties ==
- It is an even number.
- It is a practical number.
- It is a congruent number.
- It is a sparsely totient number
- It is a Harshad number in base 2 through base 10
- It is a balanced number.
- It is the 15th highly composite number, with 32 divisors: 1, 2, 3, 4, 5, 6, 7, 8, 10, 12, 14, 15, 20, 21, 24, 28, 30, 35, 40, 42, 56, 60, 70, 84, 105, 120, 140, 168, 210, 280, 420, 840. Since the sum of its divisors (excluding the number itself) 2040 > 840
- It is an abundant number and also a superabundant number.
- It is an idoneal number.
- It is the least common multiple of the numbers from 1 to 8.
- It is the smallest number divisible by every natural number from 1 to 10, except 9.
- It is the number under 1000 with the most divisors, at 32.
- It is the largest number k such that all coprime quadratic residues modulo k are squares. In this case, they are 1, 121, 169, 289, 361 and 529.
- It is an evil number.
- It is a palindrome number and a repdigit number repeated in the positional numbering system in base 29 (SS) and in base 34 (OO).
- It is the sum of a twin prime (419 + 421).
- It is the triple-digit number with the most divisors at 32.
- It is the smallest k such that the multiplicative group of integers modulo k is the direct product of 5 but no fewer cyclic groups. (Here $(\mathbb{Z}/840\mathbb{Z})^\times\cong C_2\times C_2\times C_2\times C_2\times C_{12}$). Equivalently, it is the least modulus with 2^{5} square roots of 1.
