= 610 (number) =

← 609	610	611 →
- List of numbers; Integers; ← 0 100 200 300 400 500 600 700 800 900 →
- Cardinal: six hundred ten
- Ordinal: 610th (six hundred tenth)
- Factorization: 2 × 5 × 61
- Divisors: 1, 2, 5, 10, 61, 122, 305
- Greek numeral: ΧΙ´
- Roman numeral: DCX, dcx
- Binary: 1001100010_{2}
- Ternary: 211121_{3}
- Senary: 2454_{6}
- Octal: 1142_{8}
- Duodecimal: 42A_{12}
- Hexadecimal: 262_{16}

610 is the natural number following 609 and preceding 611.

== In mathematics ==
610 is a deficient number, a Markov number, a sphenic number, a generalized pentagonal number, and the 15th number of the Fibonacci sequence, which is also the smallest Fibonacci number that begins with 6.
