= 703 (number) =

| ← 702 | 703 | 704 → |
- List of numbers; Integers; ← 0 100 200 300 400 500 600 700 800 900 →
- Cardinal: seven hundred three
- Ordinal: 703rd (seven hundred third)
- Factorization: 19 × 37
- Divisors: 1, 19, 37, 703
- Greek numeral: ΨΓ´
- Roman numeral: DCCIII, dcciii
- Binary: 1010111111_{2}
- Ternary: 222001_{3}
- Senary: 3131_{6}
- Octal: 1277_{8}
- Duodecimal: 4A7_{12}
- Hexadecimal: 2BF_{16}

703 (seven hundred [and] three) is the natural number following 702 and preceding 704.

== In mathematics ==
The prime factorization of 703 is $19 \times 37$, meaning that 703 is a composite number with four divisors.

703 is a triangular number, a hexagonal number, a centered nonagonal number, a brilliant number, a discriminant of imaginary quadratic fields with class number 14, a pseudoprime to base 3 which is also strong, and a Base 3 Euler-Jacobi pseudoprime.

703 is a Kaprekar number, since $703 = 494 + 209$, and $703^2 = 494209$. It is also one of only four known 3-Kaprekar numbers, since $37 * 19 = 703$.

It being a triangular, and Kaprekar number, it is the only Kaprekar number that is triangular.
