= 420 (number) =

← 419	420	421 →
- List of numbers; Integers; ← 0 100 200 300 400 500 600 700 800 900 →
- Cardinal: four hundred twenty
- Ordinal: 420th (four hundred twentieth)
- Factorization: 2^{2} × 3 × 5 × 7
- Divisors: 1, 2, 3, 4, 5, 6, 7, 10, 12, 14, 15, 20, 21, 28, 30, 35, 42, 60, 70, 84, 105, 140, 210, 420
- Greek numeral: ΥΚ´
- Roman numeral: CDXX, cdxx
- Binary: 110100100_{2}
- Ternary: 120120_{3}
- Senary: 1540_{6}
- Octal: 644_{8}
- Duodecimal: 2B0_{12}
- Hexadecimal: 1A4_{16}

420 (four hundred [and] twenty) is the natural number following 419 and preceding 421.

== In mathematics ==
420 is a zero of the Mertens function, a sparsely totient number, a pronic number, a balanced number, a largely composite number, a unitary harmonic number, an infinitary harmonic number. and a cluster prime.

420 is the number of minimal covers on 7 objects with 6 members.

=== Divisors ===
The divisors of 420 is 1, 2, 3, 4, 5, 6, 7, 10, 12, 14, 15, 20, 21, 28, 30, 35, 42, 60, 70, 84, 105, 140, 210, and 420. Because the first seven divisors is going from 1 to 7, it is the smallest number that is divisible by 1 through 7.

== In other fields ==
420 (pronounced four-twenty) is a cannabis culture slang for cannabis consumption.
