= 836 (number) =

← 835	836	837 →
- List of numbers; Integers; ← 0 100 200 300 400 500 600 700 800 900 →
- Cardinal: eight hundred thirty-six
- Ordinal: 836th (eight hundred thirty-sixth)
- Factorization: 2^{2} × 11 × 19
- Greek numeral: ΩΛϚ´
- Roman numeral: DCCCXXXVI, dcccxxxvi
- Binary: 1101000100_{2}
- Ternary: 1010222_{3}
- Senary: 3512_{6}
- Octal: 1504_{8}
- Duodecimal: 598_{12}
- Hexadecimal: 344_{16}

836 (eight hundred [and] thirty-six) is the natural number following 835 and preceding 837.

== In mathematics ==
The factorization of 836 is 2^{2} × 11 × 19, so its proper factors are 1, 2, 4, 11, 19, 22, 38, 44, 76, 209, 418, and 836. Summing the factors (excluding itself) gives 844. As this is greater than 836, it is an abundant number, but no subset sums to 836, so it is not a semiperfect number; therefore it is a weird number, more specifically the second one. Besides, 836 is the smallest weird number that is also an untouchable number, i.e. there is no n such that the sum of proper factors of n equals 836 (The only smaller weird number, 70, is not untouchable, since σ(134) − 134 = 70). 836 isn't a palindrome number, but its square is palindromic (836 × 836 = 698896).

== See also ==
- 836, a year
- 836 Jole, an asteroid
- 836th Air Division, an inactive United States Air Force organization
- 836 Naval Air Squadron, a World War II organization in the British Navy
- Pi Arietis, designated as object 836 in the Bright Star catalogue
