= 399 (number) =

← 398	399	400 →
- List of numbers; Integers; ← 0 100 200 300 400 500 600 700 800 900 →
- Cardinal: three hundred ninety-nine
- Ordinal: 399th (three hundred ninety-ninth)
- Factorization: 3 × 7 × 19
- Divisors: 1, 3, 7, 19, 21, 57, 133, 399
- Greek numeral: ΤϞΘ´
- Roman numeral: CCCXCIX, cccxcix
- Binary: 110001111_{2}
- Ternary: 112210_{3}
- Senary: 1503_{6}
- Octal: 617_{8}
- Duodecimal: 293_{12}
- Hexadecimal: 18F_{16}

399 (three hundred [and] ninety-nine) is the natural number and integer following 398 and preceding 400.

== In mathematics ==
399 is an odd composite number, which is also a square-free number, and a Harshad number. Since 399 is the product of three distinct primes, 3, 7, and 19, it is a sphenic number. 399 is a Leyland number of the second kind, since it is a number of the form of $4^5 - 5^4$.

=== Lucas–Carmichael number ===
A Lucas–Carmichael number is a positive composite square-free number n such that if p is a prime factor of n, then p + 1 divides n + 1.

399 satisfies this equation because 399 is a composite number that is also square-free. When you add 1 to the number (399 + 1 = 400) and the prime factors (3 + 1, 7 + 1, 19 + 1), the product of the prime factors will be the prime factors of 400, meaning that 399 is a Lucas–Carmichael number, and it is also the smallest one.
