= 137 (number) =

← 136	137	138 →
- ← 130 131 132 133 134 135 136 137 138 139 →: List of numbers; Integers; ← 0 100 200 300 400 500 600 700 800 900 →
- Cardinal: one hundred thirty-seven
- Ordinal: 137th (one hundred thirty-seventh)
- Factorization: prime
- Prime: 33rd
- Divisors: 1, 137
- Greek numeral: ΡΛΖ´
- Roman numeral: CXXXVII, cxxxvii
- Binary: 10001001_{2}
- Ternary: 12002_{3}
- Senary: 345_{6}
- Octal: 211_{8}
- Duodecimal: B5_{12}
- Hexadecimal: 89_{16}

137 (one hundred [and] thirty-seven) is the natural number following 136 and preceding 138.

== Mathematics ==
137 is:

- the 33rd prime number; the next is 139, with which it comprises a twin prime, and thus 137 is a Chen prime.
- an Eisenstein prime with no imaginary part and a real part of the form $3n - 1$.
- the fourth Stern prime.
- a Pythagorean prime: a prime number of the form $4n+1$, where $n=34$ ($137=4\times 34+1$) or the sum of two squares $11^{2}+4^{2} = (121+16)$.
- a combination of three terms $4^{3}+3^{4}-2^{3} = (64+81-8)$, cube of 4 + Triangular number T4+T2 on each cube face (along 3 axes) - peaks (single 6th peak as free link)
- a strong prime in the sense that it is more than the arithmetic mean of its two neighboring primes.
- a strictly non-palindromic number and a primeval number.
- a factor of 10001 (the other being 73) and the repdigit 11111111 (= 10001 × 1111).
- In decimal notation, 1/137 = 0.0̅0̅7̅ 2̅9̅9̅ 2̅7̅, so its period value happens to be palindromic and has a period length of only 8. However, this is only special to decimal, as in pentadecimal it (1/92) has a period length of twenty-four (24) and the period value is not at all palindromic.
- it is a left and right truncatable prime, meaning its left and right digits can be truncated without compromising primality.
- a combination of 5! + 4! - 3! - 2! + 1!

== Physics ==
- 1/137 was once thought to be the exact value of the fine-structure constant. The fine-structure constant, a dimensionless physical constant, is approximately 1/137, and the astronomer Arthur Eddington conjectured in 1929 that its reciprocal was in fact precisely the integer 137, which he claimed could be "obtained by pure deduction". This conjecture was not widely adopted, and by the 1940s, the experimental values for the constant were clearly inconsistent with the conjecture, being roughly 1/137.036. In 2021, researchers at the Kastler Brossel Laboratory in Paris reported the most precise measurement yet, determining the value to be 137.035999206 with an accuracy of 81 parts per trillion.
- Physicist Leon M. Lederman numbered his home near Fermilab 137 based on the significance of the number to those in his profession. Lederman expounded on the significance of the number in his 1993 book The God Particle: If the Universe Is the Answer, What Is the Question?, noting that not only was it the inverse of the fine-structure constant, but was also related to the probability that an electron will emit or absorb a photon—i.e., Feynman's conjecture. (Note: "There is a most profound and beautiful question associated with the observed coupling constant, e, the amplitude for a real electron to emit or absorb a real photon. It is a simple number that has been experimentally determined to be close to −0.08542455. (My physicist friends won't recognize this number, because they like to remember it as the inverse of its square: about 137.03597 with about an uncertainty of about 2 in the last decimal place. It has been a mystery ever since it was discovered more than fifty years ago, and all good theoretical physicists put this number up on their wall and worry about it.) Immediately you would like to know where this number for a coupling comes from: is it related to p or perhaps to the base of natural logarithms? Nobody knows. It's one of the greatest damn mysteries of physics: a magic number that comes to us with no understanding by man. You might say the "hand of God" wrote that number, and "we don't know how He pushed his pencil". We know what kind of a dance to do experimentally to measure this number very accurately, but we don't know what kind of dance to do on the computer to make this number come out, without putting it in secretly!" — R. P. Feynman, QED: The Strange Theory of Light and Matter) He added that it also "contains the crux of electromagnetism (the electron), relativity (the velocity of light), and quantum theory (the Planck constant). It would be less unsettling if the relationship between all these important concepts turned out to be one or three or maybe a multiple of pi. But 137?" The number 137, according to Lederman, "shows up naked all over the place", meaning that scientists on any planet in the universe using whatever units they have for charge or speed, and whatever their version of the Planck constant may be, will all come up with 137, because it is a pure number. Lederman recalled that Richard Feynman had even suggested that all physicists put a sign in their offices with the number 137 to remind them of just how much they do not know.

== Jungian psychology and mysticism ==
- 137 has been the subject of psychological speculation by Swiss psychiatrist and psychoanalyst Carl Jung concerning his theory of synchronicity. Jung and physicist Wolfgang Pauli, according to the book Jung, Pauli, and the Pursuit of a Scientific Obsession by Arthur I. Miller, Emeritus Professor of History and Philosophy of Science at University College London, Jung and Pauli struggled in their search for a primal number that everything in the world hinges on, as well as a desire to quantify the unconscious.
- Wolfgang Pauli had a series of significant dreams when he engaged in psychoanalysis with Carl Jung, published in the 12th volume of The Collected Works of C. G. Jung. The dreams were progressively sophisticated, and eventually described a mandalic "world clock", which might be a symbolic format describing an estimate of the inverse of fine structure constant: α^(-1) = π^1 + π^2 + 4π^3 = 137.036... . The "world-clock" was carried by a black flying bird and consist of three discs and three pulses : SMALL pulse consist of a small pointer on a blue vertical disc advancing by 1/32, representing π; MIDDLE pulse was one completion of the vertical blue disc of 32 segments, representing π^2, which causes 1/32 advancement of a second outer horizontal disc; GREAT pulse being the complete rotation of the second horizontal disc, which contained 4 coloured sections standing 4 men holding 4 pendulums, representing 4π^3 . The completion of the second disc in the GREAT pulse will cause a full rotation of the third outer ring, which turns from black colour to golden. The function of three pulses of the World-Clock symbolically add up to 137 from π^1 + π^2 + 4π^3.
- While Carl Jung and Wolfgang Pauli were fascinated with the number 137, their lives had been entwined with meaningful synchronicities with this number. Carl Jung was born on the 26 July 1875 (207th day of the 75th year) and died on the 6 June 1961 (157th day of the 61st year), 207days + 75years + 157days + 61years = 136 Years & 364 Days, which is one day from 137 years. Wolfgang Pauli died, as himself expected, in room 137 of the Red-Cross hospital at Zurich. Carl Jung's Magnum Opus title "Liber Novus", also bears an English Gematria value of 137. The English Gematria values of the initials of name of Carl Gustav Jung, also hinted a value of 137 with numbers 3,7,10.
  - 137: Jung, Pauli, and the Pursuit of a Scientific Obsession by Arthur I. Miller, ISBN 978-0-393-33864-5, describes the friendship of Carl Jung and Wolfgang Pauli and their search for the meaning of 137 in science, medieval alchemy, dream interpretation, and the I Ching.

== Other uses ==
- The atomic number of an element not yet observed called untriseptium, the largest element on the periodic table allowed for a point nucleus by the Bohr model and the Dirac equation.
