= 138 (number) =

← 137	138	139 →
- ← 130 131 132 133 134 135 136 137 138 139 →: List of numbers; Integers; ← 0 100 200 300 400 500 600 700 800 900 →
- Cardinal: one hundred thirty-eight
- Ordinal: 138th (one hundred thirty-eighth)
- Factorization: 2 × 3 × 23
- Divisors: 1, 2, 3, 6, 23, 46, 69, 138
- Greek numeral: ΡΛΗ´
- Roman numeral: CXXXVIII, cxxxviii
- Binary: 10001010_{2}
- Ternary: 12010_{3}
- Senary: 350_{6}
- Octal: 212_{8}
- Duodecimal: B6_{12}
- Hexadecimal: 8A_{16}

138 (one hundred [and] thirty-eight) is the natural number following 137 and preceding 139.

== Mathematics ==
138 is a sphenic number, an Ulam number, an abundant number, and a square-free congruent number.

Four concentric magic circles, with a magic constant of 138.
