= 131 (number) =

← 130	131	132 →
- ← 130 131 132 133 134 135 136 137 138 139 →: List of numbers; Integers; ← 0 100 200 300 400 500 600 700 800 900 →
- Cardinal: one hundred thirty-one
- Ordinal: 131st (one hundred thirty-first)
- Factorization: prime
- Prime: 32nd
- Divisors: 1, 131
- Greek numeral: ΡΛΑ´
- Roman numeral: CXXXI, cxxxi
- Binary: 10000011_{2}
- Ternary: 11212_{3}
- Senary: 335_{6}
- Octal: 203_{8}
- Duodecimal: AB_{12}
- Hexadecimal: 83_{16}

131 (one hundred thirty one) is the natural number following 130 and preceding 132.

== In mathematics ==
131 is a Sophie Germain prime, an irregular prime, the second 3-digit palindromic prime, and also a permutable prime with 113 and 311. It can be expressed as the sum of three consecutive primes, 131 = 41 + 43 + 47. 131 is an Eisenstein prime with no imaginary part and real part of the form $3n - 1$. Because the next odd number, 133, is a semiprime, 131 is a Chen prime. 131 is an Ulam number. 131 is also a Honaker prime.

131 is a full reptend prime in base 10 (and also in base 2). The decimal expansion of 1/131 repeats the digits 007633587786259541984732824427480916030534351145038167938931 297709923664122137404580152671755725190839694656488549618320 6106870229 indefinitely.

131 is the fifth discriminant of imaginary quadratic fields with class number 5, where the 131st prime number 739 is the fifteenth such discriminant. Meanwhile, there are conjectured to be a total of 131 discriminants of class number 8 (only one more discriminant could exist).
