= 136 (number) =

← 135	136	137 →
- ← 130 131 132 133 134 135 136 137 138 139 →: List of numbers; Integers; ← 0 100 200 300 400 500 600 700 800 900 →
- Cardinal: one hundred thirty-six
- Ordinal: 136th (one hundred thirty-sixth)
- Factorization: 2^{3} × 17
- Divisors: 1, 2, 4, 8, 17, 34, 68, 136
- Greek numeral: ΡΛϚ´
- Roman numeral: CXXXVI, cxxxvi
- Binary: 10001000_{2}
- Ternary: 12001_{3}
- Senary: 344_{6}
- Octal: 210_{8}
- Duodecimal: B4_{12}
- Hexadecimal: 88_{16}

136 (one hundred [and] thirty-six) is the natural number following 135 and preceding 137.

== In mathematics ==
136 is:

- a refactorable number and a composite number.
- the 16th triangular number.
- a repdigit in base 16 (88).
