= 139 (number) =

← 138	139	140 →
- ← 130 131 132 133 134 135 136 137 138 139 →: List of numbers; Integers; ← 0 100 200 300 400 500 600 700 800 900 →
- Cardinal: one hundred thirty-nine
- Ordinal: 139th (one hundred thirty-ninth)
- Factorization: prime
- Prime: 34th
- Divisors: 1, 139
- Greek numeral: ΡΛΘ´
- Roman numeral: CXXXIX, cxxxix
- Binary: 10001011_{2}
- Ternary: 12011_{3}
- Senary: 351_{6}
- Octal: 213_{8}
- Duodecimal: B7_{12}
- Hexadecimal: 8B_{16}

139 (one hundred [and] thirty-nine) is the natural number following 138 and preceding 140.

== In mathematics ==
139 is the 34th prime number. It is a twin prime with 137. Because 141 is a semiprime, 139 is a Chen prime. 139 is the smallest prime before a prime gap of length 10.

This number is the sum of five consecutive prime numbers (19 + 23 + 29 + 31 + 37).

It is the smallest factor of 64079 which is the smallest Lucas number with prime index which is not prime. It is also the smallest factor of the first nine terms of the Euclid–Mullin sequence, making it the tenth term.

139 is a happy number and a strictly non-palindromic number.
