= 130 (number) =

← 129	130	131 →
- ← 130 131 132 133 134 135 136 137 138 139 →: List of numbers; Integers; ← 0 100 200 300 400 500 600 700 800 900 →
- Cardinal: one hundred thirty
- Ordinal: 130th (one hundred thirtieth)
- Factorization: 2 × 5 × 13
- Divisors: 1, 2, 5, 10, 13, 26, 65, 130
- Greek numeral: ΡΛ´
- Roman numeral: CXXX, cxxx
- Binary: 10000010_{2}
- Ternary: 11211_{3}
- Senary: 334_{6}
- Octal: 202_{8}
- Duodecimal: AA_{12}
- Hexadecimal: 82_{16}

130 (one hundred [and] thirty) is the natural number following 129 and preceding 131.

== In mathematics ==
130 is a sphenic number. It is a noncototient since there is no answer to the equation x - φ(x) = 130.

130 is the only integer that is the sum of the squares of its first four divisors, including 1: 1^{2} + 2^{2} + 5^{2} + 10^{2} = 130.

130 is the largest number that cannot be written as the sum of four hexagonal numbers.

130 equals both 2^{7} + 2 and 5^{3} + 5 and is therefore a doubly strictly adsurd number.

There is no value n between 130 and 4 × 130 = 520, such that 2^{n} − 1, the nth Mersenne number, is prime. As of February 2026, 130 is the largest known integer with this property.

== In other fields ==
- A 130-30 fund or a ratio up to 150/50 is a type of collective investment vehicle
