= 134 (number) =

| ← 133 | 134 | 135 → |
- ← 130 131 132 133 134 135 136 137 138 139 →: List of numbers; Integers; ← 0 100 200 300 400 500 600 700 800 900 →
- Cardinal: one hundred thirty-four
- Ordinal: 134th (one hundred thirty-fourth)
- Factorization: 2 × 67
- Divisors: 1, 2, 67, 134
- Greek numeral: ΡΛΔ´
- Roman numeral: CXXXIV, cxxxiv
- Binary: 10000110_{2}
- Ternary: 11222_{3}
- Senary: 342_{6}
- Octal: 206_{8}
- Duodecimal: B2_{12}
- Hexadecimal: 86_{16}

134 (one hundred [and] thirty-four) is the natural number following 133 and preceding 135.

== In mathematics ==
134 is a nontotient since there is no integer with exactly 134 coprimes below it. It is a noncototient since there is no integer with 134 integers with common factors below it.

134 is ${}_8C_1 + {}_8C_3 + {}_8C_4$.

In Roman numerals, 134 is a Friedman number since CXXXIV = XV * (XC/X) - I.

134^{2} + 1 = 17,957, which is a prime number. Therefore, 134 is a Størmer number.
