= 132 (number) =

← 131	132	133 →
- ← 130 131 132 133 134 135 136 137 138 139 →: List of numbers; Integers; ← 0 100 200 300 400 500 600 700 800 900 →
- Cardinal: one hundred thirty-two
- Ordinal: 132nd (one hundred thirty-second)
- Factorization: 2^{2} × 3 × 11
- Divisors: 1, 2, 3, 4, 6, 11, 12, 22, 33, 44, 66, 132
- Greek numeral: ΡΛΒ´
- Roman numeral: CXXXII, cxxxii
- Binary: 10000100_{2}
- Ternary: 11220_{3}
- Senary: 340_{6}
- Octal: 204_{8}
- Duodecimal: B0_{12}
- Hexadecimal: 84_{16}

132 (one hundred [and] thirty-two) is the natural number following 131 and preceding 133. It is 11 dozens.

== In mathematics ==
132 is the sixth Catalan number. With twelve divisors total where 12 is one of them, 132 is the 20th refactorable number, preceding the triangular 136.

132 is an oblong number, as the product of 11 and 12 whose sum instead yields the 9th prime number 23; on the other hand, 132 is the 99th composite number.

Adding all two-digit permutation subsets of 132 yields the same number:

$$12 + 13 + 21 + 23 + 31 + 32 = 132$$.

132 is the smallest number in decimal with this property, which is shared by 264, 396 and 35964 (see digit-reassembly number).

The number of irreducible trees with fifteen vertices is 132.

In a $15 \times 15$ toroidal board in the n–Queens problem, 132 is the count of non-attacking queens, with respective indicator of 19 and multiplicity of 1444 = 38^{2} (where, 2 × 19 = 38).

The exceptional outer automorphism of symmetric group S_{6} uniquely maps vertices to factorizations and edges to partitions in the graph factors of the complete graph with six vertices (and fifteen edges) K_{6}, which yields 132 blocks in Steiner system S(5,6,12).

== In other fields ==
- Refers to the Yo Soy 132 movement to vote in 2012 Mexican elections against PRI candidate Enrique Peña Nieto.
