= Prime signature =

Multiset of prime exponents in a prime factorization

In mathematics, the prime signature of a number is the multiset of (nonzero) exponents of its prime factorization. The prime signature of a number having prime factorization $p_1^{m_1}p_2^{m_2} \dots p_n^{m_n}$ is the multiset $\left \{m_1, m_2, \dots, m_n \right \}$.

For example, all prime numbers have a prime signature of {1}, the squares of primes have a prime signature of {2}, the products of 2 distinct primes have a prime signature of {1, 1} and the products of a square of a prime and a different prime (e.g. 12, 18, 20, ...) have a prime signature of {2, 1}.

== Properties ==
The divisor function τ(n), the Möbius function μ(n), the number of distinct prime divisors ω(n) of n, the number of prime divisors Ω(n) of n, the indicator function of the squarefree integers, and many other important functions in number theory, are functions of the prime signature of n.

In particular, τ(n) equals the product of the incremented by 1 exponents from the prime signature of n. For example, 20 has prime signature {2,1} and so the number of divisors is (2+1) × (1+1) = 6. Indeed, there are six divisors: 1, 2, 4, 5, 10 and 20.

The smallest number of each prime signature is a product of primorials. The first few are:

1, 2, 4, 6, 8, 12, 16, 24, 30, 32, 36, 48, 60, 64, 72, 96, 120, 128, 144, 180, 192, 210, 216, ... (sequence A025487 in the OEIS).

A number cannot divide another unless its prime signature is included in the other numbers prime signature in the Young's lattice.

This classification is often used in the definition of multiplicative functions: the multiset of the prime exponents of an integer is mapped to another multiset, and the multiplicative function is defined by using that multiset image as exponents with the (usually original) set of prime bases.

== Numbers with same prime signature ==
Signature	Numbers	OEIS ID	Description
∅	1		The number 1, as an empty product of primes
{1}	2, 3, 5, 7, 11, ...	A000040	prime numbers
{2}	4, 9, 25, 49, 121, ...	A001248	squares of prime numbers
{1, 1}	6, 10, 14, 15, 21, ...	A006881	two distinct prime divisors (square-free semiprimes)
{3}	8, 27, 125, 343, ...	A030078	cubes of prime numbers
{2, 1}	12, 18, 20, 28, ...	A054753	squares of primes times another prime
{1, 1, 1}	30, 42, 66, 70, ...	A007304	three distinct prime divisors (sphenic numbers)
{4}	16, 81, 625, 2401, ...	A030514	fourth powers of prime numbers
{3, 1}	24, 40, 54, 56, ...	A065036	cubes of primes times another prime
{2, 2}	36, 100, 196, 225, ...	A085986	squares of square-free semiprimes
{2, 1, 1}	60,84,90,126,132,140, ...	A085987	numbers of the form $p^2qr$
{1, 1, 1, 1}	210, 330, 390, 462, 510,...	A046386	product of 4 distinct primes
{5}	32, 243, 3125, ...	A050997	fifth powers of primes
{4, 1}	48,80,112,162,176,208,272,304 , ...	A178739	numbers of the form $p^4q$
{3, 2}	72,108,200,392, ...	A143610	numbers of the form $p^3q^2$
{3, 1, 1}	120, 168, 264, 270, 280, ...	A189975	numbers of the form $p^3qr$
{2, 2, 1}	180, 252, 300, 396, 450, 468, ...	A179643	numbers of the form $p^2q^2r$
{2, 1, 1, 1}	420, 630, 660, 780, 924, 990, 1020,...	A189982	numbers of the form $p^2qrs$
{1, 1, 1, 1, 1}	2310, 2730, 3570, 3990, 4290,...	A046387	products of 5 distinct primes

== Sequences defined by their prime signature ==
Given a number with prime signature S, it is

- A prime number if S = {1},
- A square if gcd(S) is even,
- A cube if gcd(S) is divisible by 3,
- A square-free integer if max(S) = 1,
- A cube-free integer if max(S) ≤ 2,
- A powerful number if min(S) ≥ 2,
- A perfect power if gcd(S) > 1,
- A k-almost prime if sum(S) = k, or
- An Achilles number if min(S) ≥ 2 and gcd(S) = 1.

== See also ==
- Canonical representation of a positive integer
