= 135 (number) =

← 134	135	136 →
- ← 130 131 132 133 134 135 136 137 138 139 →: List of numbers; Integers; ← 0 100 200 300 400 500 600 700 800 900 →
- Cardinal: one hundred thirty-five
- Ordinal: 135th (one hundred thirty-fifth)
- Factorization: 3^{3} × 5
- Divisors: 1, 3, 5, 9, 15, 27, 45, 135
- Greek numeral: ΡΛΕ´
- Roman numeral: CXXXV, cxxxv
- Binary: 10000111_{2}
- Ternary: 12000_{3}
- Senary: 343_{6}
- Octal: 207_{8}
- Duodecimal: B3_{12}
- Hexadecimal: 87_{16}

135 (one hundred [and] thirty-five) is the natural number following 134 and preceding 136.

== In mathematics ==
- There are 135 total Krotenheerdt k-uniform tilings for k < 8, with no other such tilings for higher k.
- 135 is a Harshad number.
- 135 = 2^{7} + 7
- 135^{2} + 1 = 18,226 = 2 × 13 × 701. Since 701, the largest prime factor, is greater than twice 135 (270), 135 is a Størmer number.
- 135 is a palindrome in base six: 135_{10} = 343_{6}
- In a regular octagon, each angle measures 135 degrees.

== In other fields ==
- In astrology, when two planets are 135 degrees apart, they are in an astrological aspect called a sesquiquadrate. The aspect was first used by Johannes Kepler.
