= 133 (number) =

← 132	133	134 →
- ← 130 131 132 133 134 135 136 137 138 139 →: List of numbers; Integers; ← 0 100 200 300 400 500 600 700 800 900 →
- Cardinal: one hundred thirty-three
- Ordinal: 133rd (one hundred thirty-third)
- Factorization: 7 × 19
- Divisors: 1, 7, 19, 133
- Greek numeral: ΡΛΓ´
- Roman numeral: CXXXIII
- Binary: 10000101_{2}
- Ternary: 11221_{3}
- Senary: 341_{6}
- Octal: 205_{8}
- Duodecimal: B1_{12}
- Hexadecimal: 85_{16}

133 (one hundred [and] thirty-three) is the natural number following 132 and preceding 134.

== In mathematics ==
133 is an n whose divisors (excluding n itself) added up divide φ(n). It is an octagonal number and a happy number.

133 is a Harshad number, because it is divisible by the sum of its digits.

133 is a repdigit in base 11 (111) and base 18 (77), whilst in base 20 it is a cyclic number formed from the reciprocal of the number three.

133 is a semiprime: a product of two prime numbers, namely 7 and 19. Since those prime factors are Gaussian primes, this means that 133 is a Blum integer.

133 is the number of compositions of 13 into distinct parts.

133 is the 100th composite number.
