= Division lattice =

The non-negative integers partially ordered by divisibility.

The division lattice is an infinite complete bounded distributive lattice whose elements are the natural numbers ordered by divisibility. Its least element is 1, which divides all natural numbers, while its greatest element is 0, which is divisible by all positive natural numbers. The meet operation is greatest common divisor while the join operation is least common multiple.

The prime numbers are precisely the atoms of the division lattice, namely those natural numbers divisible only by themselves and 1.

For any square-free number n, its divisors form a Boolean algebra that is a sublattice of the division lattice. The elements of this sublattice are representable as the subsets of the set of prime factors of n.
