= Palindromic number =

Number that remains the same when its digits are reversed

A palindromic number (also known as a numeral palindrome or a numeric palindrome) is a number (such as 16361) that remains the same when its digits are reversed. In other words, it has reflectional symmetry across a vertical axis. The term palindromic is derived from palindrome, which refers to a word (such as rotor or racecar) whose spelling is unchanged when its letters are reversed. The first 30 palindromic numbers (in decimal) are:

0, 1, 2, 3, 4, 5, 6, 7, 8, 9, 11, 22, 33, 44, 55, 66, 77, 88, 99, 101, 111, 121, 131, 141, 151, 161, 171, 181, 191, 202, ... (sequence A002113 in the OEIS).

Palindromic numbers receive most attention in the realm of recreational mathematics. A typical problem asks for numbers that possess a certain property and are palindromic. For instance:

- The palindromic primes are 2, 3, 5, 7, 11, 101, 131, 151, ... (sequence A002385 in the OEIS).
- The palindromic square numbers are 0, 1, 4, 9, 121, 484, 676, 10201, 12321, ... (sequence A002779 in the OEIS).

In any base there are infinitely many palindromic numbers, since in any base the infinite sequence of numbers written (in that base) as 101, 1001, 10001, 100001, etc. consists solely of palindromic numbers.

== Formal definition ==
Although palindromic numbers are most often considered in the decimal system, the concept of palindromicity can be applied to the natural numbers in any numeral system. Consider a number n > 0 in base b ≥ 2, where it is written in standard notation with k+1 digits a_{i} as:

$$n=\sum_{i=0}^ka_ib^i$$

with, as usual, 0 ≤ a_{i} < b for all i and a_{k} ≠ 0. Then n is palindromic if and only if a_{i} = a_{k−i} for all i. Zero is written 0 in any base and is also palindromic by definition.

== Decimal palindromic numbers ==
All numbers with one digit are palindromic, so in base 10 there are ten palindromic numbers with one digit:

{0, 1, 2, 3, 4, 5, 6, 7, 8, 9}.

There are 9 palindromic numbers with two digits:

{11, 22, 33, 44, 55, 66, 77, 88, 99}.

All palindromic numbers with an even number of digits are divisible by 11.

Similarly, if equal-interval multiples of 3 are half of 6-digit palindromes (e.g. 345,543 and 852,258), all such palindromes (6-digit, 12-digit, 18-digit and so on) are multiples of 1,221 (11 × 111).

There are 90 palindromic numbers with three digits (Using the rule of product: 9 choices for the first digit - which determines the third digit as well - multiplied by 10 choices for the second digit):

{101, 111, 121, 131, 141, 151, 161, 171, 181, 191, ..., 909, 919, 929, 939, 949, 959, 969, 979, 989, 999}

There are likewise 90 palindromic numbers with four digits (again, 9 choices for the first digit multiplied by ten choices for the second digit. The other two digits are determined by the choice of the first two):

{1001, 1111, 1221, 1331, 1441, 1551, 1661, 1771, 1881, 1991, ..., 9009, 9119, 9229, 9339, 9449, 9559, 9669, 9779, 9889, 9999},

so there are 199 palindromic numbers smaller than 10^{4}.

There are 1099 palindromic numbers smaller than 10^{5} and for other exponents of 10^{n} we have: 1999, 10999, 19999, 109999, 199999, 1099999, ... (sequence A070199 in the OEIS). The number of palindromic numbers which have some other property are listed below:

	10^{1}	10^{2}	10^{3}	10^{4}	10^{5}	10^{6}	10^{7}	10^{8}	10^{9}	10^{10}
n natural	10	19	109	199	1099	1999	10999	19999	109999	199999
n even	5	9	49	89	489	889	4889	8889	48889	88889
n odd	5	10	60	110	610	1110	6110	11110	61110	111110
n square	4		7		14	15	20		31	
n cube	3		4	5			7			8
n prime	4	5	20		113		781		5953	
n squarefree	6	12	67	120	675	1200	6821	12160	+	+
n non-squarefree (μ(n)=0)	4	7	42	79	424	799	4178	7839	+	+
n square with prime root	2	3		5						
n with an even number of distinct prime factors (μ(n)=1)	2	6	35	56	324	583	3383	6093	+	+
n with an odd number of distinct prime factors (μ(n)=-1)	4	6	32	64	351	617	3438	6067	+	+
n even with an odd number of prime factors	1	2	9	21	100	180	1010	6067	+	+
n even with an odd number of distinct prime factors	3	4	21	49	268	482	2486	4452	+	+
n odd with an odd number of prime factors	3	4	23	43	251	437	2428	4315	+	+
n odd with an odd number of distinct prime factors	4	5	28	56	317	566	3070	5607	+	+
n even squarefree with an even number of (distinct) prime factors	1	2	11	15	98	171	991	1782	+	+
n odd squarefree with an even number of (distinct) prime factors	1	4	24	41	226	412	2392	4221	+	+
n odd with exactly 2 prime factors	1	4	25	39	205	303	1768	2403	+	+
n even with exactly 2 prime factors	2	3	11		64		413		+	+
n even with exactly 3 prime factors	1	3	14	24	122	179	1056	1400	+	+
n even with exactly 3 distinct prime factors	0	1	18	44	250	390	2001	2814	+	+
n odd with exactly 3 prime factors	0	1	12	34	173	348	1762	3292	+	+
n Carmichael number	0	0	0	0	0	1	1	1	1	1
n for which σ(n) is palindromic	6	10	47	114	688	1417	5683	+	+	+

=== Perfect powers ===
There are many palindromic perfect powers n^{k}, where n is a natural number and k is 2, 3 or 4.

- Palindromic squares: 0, 1, 4, 9, 121, 484, 676, 10201, 12321, 14641, 40804, 44944, ... (sequence A002779 in the OEIS)
- Palindromic cubes: 0, 1, 8, 343, 1331, 1030301, 1367631, 1003003001, ... (sequence A002781 in the OEIS)
- Palindromic fourth powers: 0, 1, 14641, 104060401, 1004006004001, ... (sequence A186080 in the OEIS)

The first nine terms of the sequence 1^{2}, 11^{2}, 111^{2}, 1111^{2}, ... form the palindromes 1, 121, 12321, 1234321, ... (sequence A002477 in the OEIS)

The only known non-palindromic number whose cube is a palindrome is 2201, and it is a conjecture the fourth root of all the palindrome fourth powers are a palindrome with 100000...000001 (10^{n} + 1).

Gustavus Simmons conjectured there are no palindromes of form n^{k} for k > 4 (and n > 1).

== Other bases ==
Palindromic numbers can be considered in numeral systems other than decimal. For example, the binary palindromic numbers are those with the binary representations:

0, 1, 11, 101, 111, 1001, 1111, 10001, 10101, 11011, 11111, 100001, ... (sequence A057148 in the OEIS)

or in decimal:

0, 1, 3, 5, 7, 9, 15, 17, 21, 27, 31, 33, ... (sequence A006995 in the OEIS)

The Fermat primes and the Mersenne primes form a subset of the binary palindromic primes.

Any number $n$ is palindromic in all bases $b$ with $b > n$ (trivially so, because $n$ is then a single-digit number), and also in base $n-1$ (because $n$ is then $11_{n-1}$). Even excluding cases where the number is smaller than the base, most numbers are palindromic in more than one base. For example, $1221_4=151_8=77_{14}=55_{20}=33_{34}=11_{104}$, $1991_{10}=7C7_{16}$. A number $n$ is never palindromic in base $b$ if $n/2 \le b \le n-2$. Moreover, a prime number $p$ is never palindromic in base $b$ if $\sqrt{p} < b < p-1$.

A number that is non-palindromic in all bases b in the range 2 ≤ b ≤ n − 2 can be called a strictly non-palindromic number. For example, the number 6 is written as "110" in base 2, "20" in base 3, and "12" in base 4, none of which are palindromes. All strictly non-palindromic numbers larger than 6 are prime. Indeed, if $n > 6$ is composite, then either $n = ab$ for some $1 < a < b-1$, in which case n is the palindrome "aa" in base $b-1$, or else it is a perfect square $n = a^2$, in which case n is the palindrome "121" in base $a-1$ (except for the special case of $n = 9 = 1001_2$).

The first few strictly non-palindromic numbers (sequence A016038 in the OEIS) are:

0, 1, 2, 3, 4, 6, 11, 19, 47, 53, 79, 103, 137, 139, 149, 163, 167, 179, 223, 263, 269, 283, 293, 311, 317, 347, 359, 367, 389, 439, 491, 563, 569, 593, 607, 659, 739, 827, 853, 877, 977, 983, 997, ...

== Antipalindromic numbers ==
If the digits of a natural number don't only have to be reversed in order, but also subtracted from $b-1$ to yield the original sequence again, then the number is said to be antipalindromic. Formally, in the usual decomposition of a natural number into its digits $a_i$ in base $b$, a number is antipalindromic iff $a_i = b - 1 - a_{k-i}$.

== Lychrel process ==
Non-palindromic numbers can be paired with palindromic ones via a series of operations. First, the non-palindromic number is reversed and the result is added to the original number. If the result is not a palindromic number, this is repeated until it gives a palindromic number. Such number is called "a delayed palindrome".

It is not known whether all non-palindromic numbers can be paired with palindromic numbers in this way. While no number has been proven to be unpaired, many do not appear to be. For example, 196 does not yield a palindrome even after 700,000,000 iterations. Any number that never becomes palindromic in this way is known as a Lychrel number.

On January 24, 2017, the number 1,999,291,987,030,606,810 was published in OEIS as A281509 and announced "The Largest Known Most Delayed Palindrome". The sequence of 125 261-step most delayed palindromes preceding 1,999,291,987,030,606,810 and not reported before was published separately as A281508.

== Sum of the reciprocals ==
The sum of the reciprocals of the palindromic numbers is a convergent series, whose value is approximately 3.37028... (sequence A118031 in the OEIS).

== Scheherazade numbers ==
Scheherazade numbers are a set of numbers identified by Buckminster Fuller in his book Synergetics. Fuller does not give a formal definition for this term, but from the examples he gives, it can be understood to be those numbers that contain a factor of the primorial n#, where n≥13 and is the largest prime factor in the number. Fuller called these numbers Scheherazade numbers because they must have a factor of 1001. Scheherazade is the storyteller of One Thousand and One Nights, telling a new story each night to delay her execution. Since n must be at least 13, the primorial must be at least 1·2·3·5·7·11·13, and 7×11×13 = 1001. Fuller also refers to powers of 1001 as Scheherazade numbers. The smallest primorial containing Scheherazade number is 13# = 30,030.

Fuller pointed out that some of these numbers are palindromic by groups of digits. For instance 17# = 510,510 shows a symmetry of groups of three digits. Fuller called such numbers Scheherazade Sublimely Rememberable Comprehensive Dividends, or SSRCD numbers. Fuller notes that 1001 raised to a power not only produces sublimely rememberable numbers that are palindromic in three-digit groups, but also the values of the groups are the binomial coefficients. For instance,

$$(1001)^6 = 1,006,015,020,015,006,001$$

This sequence fails at (1001)^{13} because there is a carry digit taken into the group to the left in some groups. Fuller suggests writing these spillovers on a separate line. If this is done, using more spillover lines as necessary, the symmetry is preserved indefinitely to any power. Many other Scheherazade numbers show similar symmetries when expressed in this way.

== Sums of palindromes ==
In 2018, a paper was published demonstrating that every positive integer can be written as the sum of three palindromic numbers in every number system with base 5 or greater. Supplementing this paper was another paper demonstrating that every positive integer can be written as the sum of three palindromic numbers in base 3 and in base 4, and four palindromic numbers in base 2.
