= 700 (number) =

← 699	700	701 →
- List of numbers; Integers; ← 0 100 200 300 400 500 600 700 800 900 →
- Cardinal: seven hundred
- Ordinal: 700th (seven hundredth)
- Factorization: 2^{2} × 5^{2} × 7
- Greek numeral: Ψ´
- Roman numeral: DCC, dcc
- Binary: 1010111100_{2}
- Ternary: 221221_{3}
- Senary: 3124_{6}
- Octal: 1274_{8}
- Duodecimal: 4A4_{12}
- Hexadecimal: 2BC_{16}
- Armenian: Չ
- Hebrew: ת"ש / ן
- Babylonian cuneiform: 𒌋𒐕𒐏
- Egyptian hieroglyph: 𓍨

700 (seven hundred) is the natural number following 699 and preceding 701.

It is a composite number and the sum of four consecutive primes (167 + 173 + 179 + 181).

== Integers from 701 to 799 ==
=== 700s ===
==== 701 ====
701 is a prime number, a Chen prime, an Eisenstein prime with no imaginary part, and the sum of three consecutive primes (229 + 233 + 239).

==== 702 ====
702 = 2 × 3^{3} × 13. It is a pronic number, a nontotient, and a Harshad number.

==== 703 ====
703 = 19 × 37. It is a hexagonal number, a Kaprekar number and the 37th triangular number. It is the smallest number requiring 73 fifth powers for Waring representation.

703 is commonly found in the formula for body mass index.

==== 704 ====
704 = 2^{6} × 11. It is a Harshad number and a lazy caterer number.

==== 705 ====
705 = 3 × 5 × 47. It is a sphenic number the smallest Bruckman-Lucas pseudoprime.

==== 706 ====
706 = 2 × 353. It is a nontotient a Smith number.

==== 707 ====
707 = 7 × 101. It is a palindromic number and the sum of five consecutive primes (131 + 137 + 139 + 149 + 151). There are 707 lattice paths from (0,0) to (5,5) with steps (0,1), (1,0) and, when on the diagonal, (1,1).

==== 708 ====
708 = 2^{2} × 3 × 59. There are 708 partitions of 28 that do not contain 1 as a part.

==== 709 ====
709 is a prime number and a happy number.

It is the seventh in the series 2, 3, 5, 11, 31, 127, 709 where each number is the nth prime with n being the number preceding it in the series, therefore, it is a prime index number.

=== 710s ===
==== 710 ====
710 = 2 × 5 × 71. It is a sphenic number and a nontotient. There are 710 forests with 11 vertices.

==== 711 ====
711 = 3^{2} × 79. It is a Harshad number. There are 711 planar Berge perfect graphs on 7 nodes.

==== 712 ====
712 = 2^{3} × 89. It is a refactorable number, the totient sum for first 48 integers, and the sum of the first twenty-one primes.

It is the largest known number such that it and its 8th power (66,045,000,696,445,844,586,496) have no common digits.

==== 713 ====
713 = 23 × 31. It is a Blum integer.

In Judaism there are 713 letters on a Mezuzah scroll.

==== 714 ====
714 = 2 × 3 × 7 × 17. It is a nontotient and a balanced number, and the sum of twelve consecutive primes (37 + 41 + 43 + 47 + 53 + 59 + 61 + 67 + 71 + 73 + 79 + 83). It forms a Ruth–Aaron pair with 715 (either definition). It is the sum of twelve consecutive primes (37 + 41 + 43 + 47 + 53 + 59 + 61 + 67 + 71 + 73 + 79 + 83).

The product of 714 and 715 is the product of the first 7 prime numbers (2, 3, 5, 7, 11, 13, and 17).

==== 715 ====
715 = 5 × 11 × 13. It is a sphenic number, a pentagonal number, and a Harshad number. It forms a Ruth-Aaron pair with 714 (either definition).

It is a pentatope number because 713=$\tbinom {13}4$.

The product of 714 and 715 is the product of the first 7 prime numbers (2, 3, 5, 7, 11, 13, and 17).

==== 716 ====
716 = 2^{2} × 179.

==== 717 ====
717 = 3 × 239. It is a palindromic number.

==== 718 ====
718 = 2 × 359.

==== 719 ====
719 is a prime number, a Sophie Germain prime, a safe prime, a Chen prime, and an Eisenstein prime with no imaginary part.

Because 719 = 6! − 1, 719 is a factorial prime.

It is the sum of seven consecutive primes (89 + 97 + 101 + 103 + 107 + 109 + 113).

=== 720s ===
==== 721 ====
721 = 7 × 103. It is a centered hexagonal number and the sum of nine consecutive primes (61 + 67 + 71 + 73 + 79 + 83 + 89 + 97 + 101). It is the smallest number that is the difference of two positive cubes in two ways.

==== 722 ====
722 = 2 × 19^{2}. It is a nontotient. There are 722 odd parts in all partitions of 15.

==== 723 ====
723 = 3 × 241. It is the side length of an almost-equilateral Heronian triangle.

==== 724 ====
724 = 2^{2} × 181. It is a nontotient and the side length of an almost-equilateral Heronian triangle. It is the sum of four consecutive primes (173 + 179 + 181 + 191) and the sum of six consecutive primes (107 + 109 + 113 + 127 + 131 + 137). There are 724 n-queens problem solutions for n = 10.

==== 725 ====
725 = 5^{2} × 29. It is the side length of an almost-equilateral Heronian triangle.

==== 726 ====
726 = 2 × 3 × 11^{2}. It is a pentagonal pyramidal number.

==== 727 ====
727 is a prime number, a palindromic prime, and a lucky prime.

==== 728 ====
728 = 2^{3} × 7 × 13. It is a nontotient, a Smith number, and a cabtaxi number. There are 728 cubes of edge length 1 required to make a hollow cube of edge length 12.There are 728 connected graphs on 5 labelled vertices.

728!! - 1 is prime.

728^{64} + 1 is prime.

==== 729 ====
729 = 27^{2} = 9^{3} = 3^{6}. It is a perfect totient number, a Smith number, and a centered octagonal number. It is the largest three-digit cube (9^{3}) and the only three-digit sixth power (3^{6}).

A philosopher king's pleasure is 729 times a tyrant's pleasure according to Plato in the Republic.

=== 730s ===
==== 730 ====
730 = 2 × 5 × 73. It is a sphenic number, a nontotient, and a Harshad number. There are 730 generalized weak orders on 5 points.

==== 731 ====
731 = 17 × 43. It is the sum of three consecutive primes (239 + 241 + 251). There are 731 Euler trees with total weight 7.

==== 732 ====
732 = 2^{2} × 3 × 61. It is a Harshad number.

It is the sum of eight consecutive primes (73 + 79 + 83 + 89 + 97 + 101 + 103 + 107) and the sum of ten consecutive primes (53 + 59 + 61 + 67 + 71 + 73 + 79 + 83 + 89 + 97).

There are 732 collections of subsets of {1, 2, 3, 4} that are closed under union and intersection.

==== 733 ====
733 is a prime number, a balanced prime, a permutable prime, and an emirp. It is the sum of five consecutive primes (137 + 139 + 149 + 151 + 157)

==== 734 ====
734 = 2 × 367. It is a nontotient. There are 734 traceable graphs on 7 nodes.

==== 735 ====
735 = 3 × 5 × 7^{2}. It is a Harshad number and a Zuckerman number.

- the smallest number such that uses the same digits as its distinct prime factors

==== 736 ====
736 = 2^{5} × 23. It is a centered heptagonal number, a happy number, a Harshad number, and a nice Friedman number since 736 = 7 + 3^{6}.

==== 737 ====
737 = 11 × 67. It is a palindromic number and a blum integer.

==== 738 ====
738 = 2 × 3^{2} × 41. It is a Harshad number.

==== 739 ====
739 is a prime number, a lucky prime, a prime index prime, a happy number, and a strictly non-palindromic number.

=== 740s ===
==== 740 ====
740 = 2^{2} × 5 × 37. It is a nontotient. There are 740 connected square free graphs on 9 nodes.

==== 741 ====
741 = 3 × 13 × 19. It is a sphenic number and the 38th triangular number.

==== 742 ====
742 = 2 × 7 × 53. It is a sphenic number, a decagonal number, an icosahedral number, and a lazy caterer number. There are 742 partitions of 30 into divisors of 30.

- the smallest number that is one more than triple its reverse.

==== 743 ====
It is a prime number and an eisenstein prime with no imaginary part. 743 is a Sophie Germain prime because 2 × 743 + 1 = 1487 and 1487 is also prime. 743 is an emirp, because 347 (the reversal of its digits) is prime.

There are exactly 743 independent sets in a four-dimensional (16 vertex) hypercube graph, and exactly 743 connected cubic graphs with 16 vertices and girth four.

==== 744 ====
744 is 2 × 2 × 2 × 3 × 31, semiperfect number and an abundant number.

The j-invariant, an important function in the study of modular forms and Monstrous moonshine, can be written as a Fourier series in which the constant term is 744:
$$j(\tau) = q^{-1} + 744 + 196\,884 q + 21\,493\,760 q^2 + 864\,299\,970 q^3 + \cdots,$$
where $q = e^{2\pi i\tau}$. One consequence of this is that 744 appears in expressions for Ramanujan's constant and other almost integers.

==== 745 ====
745 = 5 × 149. There are 745 non-connected simple labeled graphs covering 6 vertices.

==== 746 ====
746 = 2 × 373.

It is a nontotient. There are 746 non-normal semi-magic squares with sum of entries equal to 6.

746=1^{5} + 2^{4} + 3^{6} = 1^{7} + 2^{4} + 3^{6}.

==== 747 ====
747 = 3^{2} × 83. It is a palindromic number.

747=$\left\lfloor {\frac {4^{23}}{3^{23}}} \right\rfloor$

===== 748 =====
748 = 2^{2} × 11 × 17. It is a nontotient, a happy number, and a primitive abundant number.

==== 749 ====
749 = 7 × 107. It is a blum integer and the sum of three consecutive primes (241 + 251 + 257).

=== 750s ===
==== 750 ====
750 = 2 × 3 × 5^{3}. It is an enneagonal number.

==== 751 ====
751 is a prime number, a Chen prime, and an emirp.

==== 752 ====
752 = 2^{4} × 47. It is a nontotient. There are 752 partitions of 11 into parts of 2 kinds

==== 753 ====
753 = 3 × 251. It is a blum integer.

==== 754 ====
754 = 2 × 13 × 29. It is a sphenic number, a nontotient, and the totient sum for first 49 integers.

There are 754 different ways to divide a 10 × 10 square into sub-squares.

==== 755 ====
755 = 5 × 151. There are 755 vertices in a regular drawing of the complete bipartite graph K_{9,9}.

==== 756 ====
756 = 2^{2} × 3^{3} × 7. It is a pronic number, a Harshad number, and the sum of six consecutive primes (109 + 113 + 127 + 131 + 137 + 139).

==== 757 ====
757 is a prime number, a palindromic prime, a happy number, and the sum of seven consecutive primes (97 + 101 + 103 + 107 + 109 + 113 + 127).

==== 758 ====
758 = 2 × 379.

It is a nontotient and a prime number of measurement.

==== 759 ====
759 = 3 × 11 × 23.

It is a sphenic number, a q-Fibonacci number for q=3, and the sum of five consecutive primes (139 + 149 + 151 + 157 + 163).

=== 760s ===
==== 760 ====
760 = 2^{3} × 5 × 19.

It is a centered triangular number. There are 760 fixed heptominoes.

==== 761 ====
761 is a prime number, an emirp, a Sophie Germain prime, a Chen prime, an Eisenstein prime with no imaginary part, and a centered square number.

==== 762 ====
762 = 2 × 3 × 127. It is a sphenic number, a nontotient, a Smith number, an admirable number, and the sum of four consecutive primes (181 + 191 + 193 + 197).

There are 762 1's in all partitions of 25 into odd parts There are Six nines in the decimal representation of pi after the 762nd digit.

==== 763 ====
763 = 7 × 109.

It is the sum of nine consecutive primes (67 + 71 + 73 + 79 + 83 + 89 + 97 + 101 + 103). There are 763 degree-8 permutations of order exactly 2.

==== 764 ====
764 = 2^{2} × 191. It is a telephone number.

==== 765 ====
765=3^{2} × 5 × 17.

It is an octagonal pyramidal number.

It is a Japanese word-play for Namco.

==== 766 ====
766 = 2 × 383. It is a centered pentagonal number, a nontotient, and the sum of twelve consecutive primes (41 + 43 + 47 + 53 + 59 + 61 + 67 + 71 + 73 + 79 + 83 + 89).

==== 767 ====
767 = 13 × 59. It is a palindromic number and a Thabit number because 767 = 2^{8} × 3 − 1

==== 768 ====
768 = 2^{8} × 3. It is the sum of eight consecutive primes (79 + 83 + 89 + 97 + 101 + 103 + 107 + 109).

==== 769 ====
769 is a prime number, a Chen prime, a lucky prime, and a Proth prime.

=== 770s ===
==== 770 ====
770 = 2 × 5 × 7 × 11. It is a nontotient and a Harshad number.

$\sum_{n=0}^{10} 770^{n}$ is prime

It holds special importance in the Chabad-Lubavitch Hasidic movement.

==== 771 ====
771 = 3 × 257.

It is sum of three consecutive primes in arithmetic progression (251 + 257 + 263). Since 771 is the product of the distinct Fermat primes 3 and 257, a regular polygon with 771 sides can be constructed using compass and straightedge, and $\cos\left(\frac{2\pi}{771}\right)$ can be written in terms of square roots.

==== 772 ====
772 = 2^{2} × 193.

772!!!!!!+1 is prime.

==== 773 ====
773 is a prime number, an Eisenstein prime with no imaginary part, a prime index prime, and a tetranacci number.

- the sum of the number of cells that make up the convex, regular 4-polytopes

==== 774 ====
774 = 2 × 3^{2} × 43. It is a nontotient, a Harshad number, and the totient sum for first 50 integers

==== 775 ====
775 = 5^{2} × 31. It is a member of the Mian–Chowla sequence

==== 776 ====
776 = 2^{3} × 97.

It is a refactorable number. There are 776 compositions of 6 whose parts equal to q can be of q^{2} kinds.

==== 778 ====
778 = 2 × 389. It is a nontotient and a Smith number.

==== 779 ====
779 = 19 × 41. It is a highly cototient number.

=== 780s ===
==== 780 ====
780 = 2^{2} × 3 × 5 × 13. It is a hexagonal number, a Harshad number, and the 39th triangular number. It is the sum of four consecutive primes in a quadruplet (191, 193, 197, and 199) and the sum of ten consecutive primes (59 + 61 + 67 + 71 + 73 + 79 + 83 + 89 + 97 + 101).

780 and 990 are the fourth smallest pair of triangular numbers whose sum and difference (1770 and 210) are also triangular.

==== 781 ====
781 = 11 × 71. It is a zero of the Mertens function and a lazy caterer number (sequence A000124 in the OEIS) It is the sum of powers of 5, or equivalently, repdigit in base 5 (11111)

==== 782 ====
782 = 2 × 17 × 23. It is a sphenic number, a nontotient, a pentagonal number, and a Harshad number.

==== 783 ====
783 = 3^{3} × 29. It is a heptagonal number.

==== 784 ====
784 = 2^{4} × 7^{2}. It is a happy number.

Since 784=28^{2}, 784 is a perfect square. It is the sum of the cubes of the first seven positive integers; $1^3+2^3+3^3+4^3+5^3+6^3+7^3=784$.

==== 785 ====
785 = 5 × 157. It is a zero of the Mertens function. There are 785 series-reduced planted trees with 6 leaves of 2 colors.

==== 787 ====
787 is a prime number, a Chen prime, a lucky prime, a palindromic prime, and the sum of five consecutive primes (149 + 151 + 157 + 163 + 167).

==== 788 ====
788 = 2^{2} × 197.

It is a nontotient. There are 788 compositions of 12 into parts with distinct multiplicities.

==== 789 ====
789 = 3 × 263. It is a Blum integer and the sum of three consecutive primes (257 + 263 + 269).

=== 790s ===
==== 790 ====
790 = 2 × 5 × 79. It is a sphenic number, a nontotient, an aspiring number, and the aliquot sum of 1574. It is a Harshad number in bases 2, 7, 14, and 16.

==== 791 ====
791 = 7 × 113. It is a centered tetrahedral number, the sum of the first twenty-two primes, and the sum of seven consecutive primes (101 + 103 + 107 + 109 + 113 + 127 + 131).

==== 792 ====
792 = 2^{3} × 3^{2} × 11. It is a Harshad number.

- the sum of the nontriangular numbers between successive triangular numbers

There are 792 integer partitions of 21.

792=$\tbinom {12}5$, a binomial coefficient.

==== 793 ====
793 = 13 × 61. It is a zero of the Mertens function, a star number, and a happy number.

==== 794 ====
794 = 2 × 397. It is a nontotient.

794= 1^{6} + 2^{6} + 3^{6}.

==== 795 ====
795 = 3 × 5 × 53. It is a sphenic number and a zero of the Mertens function.

There are 795 permutations of length 7 with 2 consecutive ascending pairs.

==== 796 ====
796 = 2^{2} × 199. It is a zero of the Mertens function and the sum of six consecutive primes (113 + 127 + 131 + 137 + 139 + 149).

==== 797 ====
797 is a prime number, a Chen prime, an Eisenstein prime with no imaginary part, a palindromic prime, a two-sided prime, and a prime index prime.

==== 798 ====
798 = 2 × 3 × 7 × 19. It is a zero of the Mertens function and a nontotient.

- the product of primes indexed by the prime exponents of 10!

==== 799 ====
799 = 17 × 47. It is the smallest number with digit sum 25
