= Lucky number =

Integer filtered out using a sieve similar to that of Eratosthenes

In number theory, a lucky number is a natural number in a set which is generated by a certain "sieve". This sieve is similar to the sieve of Eratosthenes that generates the primes, but it eliminates numbers based on their position in the remaining set, instead of their value (or position in the initial set of natural numbers).

The term was introduced in 1956 in a paper by Verna Gardiner, R. Lazarus, Nicholas Metropolis and Stanisław Ulam. In the same work they also suggested calling another sieve, "the sieve of Josephus Flavius" because of its similarity with the counting-out game in the Josephus problem.

Lucky numbers share some properties with primes, such as asymptotic behaviour according to the prime number theorem; also, a version of Goldbach's conjecture has been extended to them. There are infinitely many lucky numbers. Twin lucky numbers and twin primes also appear to occur with similar frequency. However, if L_{n} denotes the n-th lucky number, and p_{n} the n-th prime, then L_{n} > p_{n} for all sufficiently large n.

Because of their apparent similarities with the prime numbers, some mathematicians have suggested that some of their common properties may also be found in other sets of numbers generated by sieves of a certain unknown form, but there is little theoretical basis for this conjecture.

== The sieving process ==
An animation demonstrating the lucky number sieve. The numbers on a reddish orange background are lucky numbers. When a number is eliminated its background changes from grey to purple. Chart goes to 120.

Begin with a list of integers starting with 1:
1	2	3	4	5	6	7	8	9	10	11	12	13	14	15	16	17	18	19	20	21	22	23	24	25
Every second number (all even numbers) in the list is eliminated, leaving only the odd integers:
1		3		5		7		9		11		13		15		17		19		21		23		25
The first number remaining in the list after 1 is 3, so every third number (beginning at 1) which remains in the list (not every multiple of 3) is eliminated. The first of these is 5:
1		3				7		9				13		15				19		21				25
The next surviving number is now 7, so every seventh remaining number is eliminated. The first of these is 19:
1		3				7		9				13		15						21				25

Continue removing the nth remaining numbers, where n is the next number in the list after the last surviving number. Next in this example is 9.

One way that the application of the procedure differs from that of the Sieve of Eratosthenes is that for n being the number being multiplied on a specific pass, the first number eliminated on the pass is the n-th remaining number that has not yet been eliminated, as opposed to the number 2n. That is to say, the list of numbers this sieve counts through is different on each pass (for example 1, 3, 7, 9, 13, 15, 19... on the third pass), whereas in the Sieve of Eratosthenes, the sieve always counts through the entire original list (1, 2, 3...).

When this procedure has been carried out completely, the remaining integers are the lucky numbers (those that happen to be prime are in bold):

1, 3, 7, 9, 13, 15, 21, 25, 31, 33, 37, 43, 49, 51, 63, 67, 69, 73, 75, 79, 87, 93, 99, 105, 111, 115, 127, 129, 133, 135, 141, 151, 159, 163, 169, 171, 189, 193, 195, 201, 205, 211, 219, 223, 231, 235, 237, 241, 259, 261, 267, 273, 283, 285, 289, 297, 303, 307, 319, 321, 327, 331, 339, ... (sequence A000959 in the OEIS).

The lucky number which removes n from the list of lucky numbers is: (0 if n is a lucky number)

0, 2, 0, 2, 3, 2, 0, 2, 0, 2, 3, 2, 0, 2, 0, 2, 3, 2, 7, 2, 0, 2, 3, 2, 0, 2, 9, 2, 3, 2, 0, 2, 0, 2, 3, 2, 0, 2, 7, 2, 3, 2, 0, 2, 13, 2, 3, 2, 0, 2, 0, 2, 3, 2, 15, 2, 9, 2, 3, 2, 7, 2, 0, 2, 3, 2, 0, 2, 0, 2, 3, 2, 0, 2, 0, 2, 3, 2, 0, 2, 7, 2, 3, 2, 21, 2, ... (sequence A264940 in the OEIS)

== Lucky primes ==
A "lucky prime" is a lucky number that is prime. They are:

3, 7, 13, 31, 37, 43, 67, 73, 79, 127, 151, 163, 193, 211, 223, 241, 283, 307, 331, 349, 367, 409, 421, 433, 463, 487, 541, 577, 601, 613, 619, 631, 643, 673, 727, 739, 769, 787, 823, 883, 937, 991, 997, ... (sequence A031157 in the OEIS).

It has been conjectured that there are infinitely many lucky primes.

== See also ==
- Lucky numbers of Euler
- Fortunate number
- Happy number
- Harshad number
- Josephus problem
- Gambling
- Lottery
- Keno
