= 900 (number) =

← 899	900	901 →
- List of numbers; Integers; ← 0 100 200 300 400 500 600 700 800 900 →
- Cardinal: nine hundred
- Ordinal: 900th (nine hundredth)
- Factorization: 2^{2} × 3^{2} × 5^{2}
- Divisors: 1, 2, 3, 4, 5, 6, 9, 10, 12, 15, 18, 20, 25, 30, 36, 45, 50, 60, 75, 90, 100, 150, 180, 225, 300, 450, 900
- Greek numeral: Ϡ´
- Roman numeral: CM, cm
- Binary: 1110000100_{2}
- Ternary: 1020100_{3}
- Senary: 4100_{6}
- Octal: 1604_{8}
- Duodecimal: 630_{12}
- Hexadecimal: 384_{16}
- Armenian: Ջ
- Hebrew: תת"ק / ץ
- Babylonian cuneiform: 𒌋𒐙
- Egyptian hieroglyph: 𓍪

900 (nine hundred) is the natural number following 899 and preceding 901.

== In mathematics ==
It is the square of 30 and the sum of Euler's totient function for the first 54 positive integers. In base 10, it is a Harshad number. It is also the first number to be the square of a sphenic number.

== In other fields ==
900 is also:

- In Greek number symbols, the sign Sampi ("ϡ", literally "like a pi")
- A skateboarding trick in which the skateboarder spins two and a half times (360 degrees times 2.5 is 900)
- A 900 series refers to three consecutive perfect games in bowling
- Yoda's age in Star Wars

== Integers from 901 to 999 ==
=== 900s ===
==== 901 ====
901 = 17 × 53. It is a centered triangular number and a happy number.

==== 902 ====
902 = 2 × 11 × 41. It is a sphenic number, a nontotient, and a Harshad number.

==== 903 ====
903 = 3 × 7 × 43. It is a sphenic number, a little Schroeder number, a Schröder–Hipparchus number, a zero of Mertens function, and the 42nd triangular number.

==== 904 ====
904 = 2^{3} × 113. It is a refactorable number, a lazy caterer number, and a zero of Mertens function. There are 904 1's in all partitions of 26 into odd parts.

==== 905 ====
905 = 5 × 181. It is the smallest composite de Polignac number and the sum of seven consecutive primes (109 + 113 + 127 + 131 + 137 + 139 + 149).

"The 905" is a common nickname for the suburban portions of the Greater Toronto Area in Canada, a region whose telephones used area code 905 before overlay plans added two more area codes.

==== 906 ====
906 = 2 × 3 × 151. It is a strobogrammatic number, a sphenic number, and a zero of Mertens function.

==== 907 ====
907 is a prime number.

==== 908 ====
908 = 2^{2} × 227. It is a nontotient. There are 908 primitive sorting networks on 6 elements. There are 908 rhombic tilings of a 12-gon.

==== 909 ====
909 = 3^{2} × 101. There are 909 non-isomorphic aperiodic multiset partitions of weight 7.

=== 910s ===
==== 910 ====
910 = 2 × 5 × 7 × 13. It is a Harshad number, a happy number, a zreo of Mertens function, and a balanced number. There are 910 polynomial symmetric functions of matrix of order 7 under separate row and column permutations.

==== 911 ====
It is a prime number, a Sophie Germain prime, and the sum of three consecutive primes (293 + 307 + 311). It is an Eisenstein prime with no imaginary part and real part of the form $3n-1$. Since 913 is a semiprime, 911 is a Chen prime.

It is also a centered decagonal number.

There are 911 inverse semigroups of order 7.

911 is obtained by concatenating its product of digits and sum of digits.

911 can be a short form of referring to the terrorist attack in the United States in 2001.

==== 912 ====
912 = 2^{4} × 3 × 19. It is a Harshad number, the sum of four consecutive primes (223 + 227 + 229 + 233), and the sum of ten consecutive primes (71 + 73 + 79 + 83 + 89 + 97 + 101 + 103 + 107 + 109).

==== 913 ====
913 = 11 × 83. It is a Smith number and a zero of Mertens function.

==== 914 ====
914 = 2 × 457. It is a nontotient. There are 914 compositions of 11 that are neither weakly increasing nor weakly decreasing.

==== 915 ====
915 = 3 × 5 × 61. It is a sphenic number, a Smith number, a Harshad number, and a zero of Mertens function.

==== 916 ====
916 = 2^{2} × 229. It is a strobogrammatic number, a zero of Mertens function, a nontotient, and a member of the Mian–Chowla sequence.

==== 917 ====
917 = 7 × 131. It is the sum of five consecutive primes (173 + 179 + 181 + 191 + 193).

==== 918 ====
918 = 2 × 3^{3} × 17. It is a Harshad number.

==== 919 ====
919 is a prime number, a cuban prime, a prime index prime, a Chen prime, a palindromic prime, acentered hexagonal number, and a zero of Mertens function.

=== 920s ===
==== 920 ====
920 = 2^{3} × 5 × 23. It is a zero of Mertens function. There are a total of 920 nodes in all rooted trees with 8 nodes.

==== 921 ====
921 = 3 × 307. There are 921 enriched r-trees of size 7.

==== 922 ====
922 = 2 × 461. It is a nontotient and a Smith number.

==== 923 ====
923 = 13 × 71. There are 923 combinations of 6 things from 1 to 6 at a time.

==== 924 ====
924 = 2^{2} × 3 × 7 × 11. It is the sum of a twin prime (461 + 463), central binomial coefficient $\tbinom {12} 6$.

==== 925 ====
925 = 5^{2} × 37. It is a pentagonal number and a centered square number.

925 is the millesimal fineness number for Sterling silver.

==== 926 ====
926 = 2 × 463. It is a nontotient and the sum of six consecutive primes (139 + 149 + 151 + 157 + 163 + 167).

==== 927 ====
927 = 3^{2} × 103. It is a tribonacci number.

==== 928 ====
928 = 2^{5} × 29. It is a happy number, the sum of four consecutive primes (227 + 229 + 233 + 239), and the sum of eight consecutive primes (101 + 103 + 107 + 109 + 113 + 127 + 131 + 137).

==== 929 ====
929 is a prime number, a Proth prime, a palindromic prime, an Eisenstein prime with no imaginary part, and the sum of nine consecutive primes (83 + 89 + 97 + 101 + 103 + 107 + 109 + 113 + 127).

There are 929 chapters in Tanakh, giving the name to 929: Tanakh B'yachad.

The PDF417 barcode format uses a GF(929) error-correction code.

=== 930s ===
==== 931 ====
931 = 7^{2} × 19. It is the sum of three consecutive primes (307 + 311 + 313). It is a repdigit in two different bases 111_{30} and 777_{11}. There are 931 regular simple graphs spanning 7 vertices.

==== 932 ====
932 = 2^{2} × 233. There are 932 regular simple graphs on 7 labeled nodes.

==== 933 ====
933 = 3 × 311.

==== 934 ====
934 = 2 × 467. It is a nontotient.

==== 935 ====
935 = 5 × 11 × 17. It is a sphenic number, a Lucas–Carmichael number, and a Harshad number.

==== 936 ====
936 = 2^{3} × 3^{2} × 13. It is a pentagonal pyramidal number and a Harshad number.

==== 937 ====
937 is a prime number, a Chen prime, a star number, and a happy number.

==== 938 ====
938 = 2 × 7 × 67. It is a sphenic number and a nontotient. There are 938 lines through at least 2 points of an 8 × 8 grid of points.

==== 939 ====
939 = 3 × 313. There are 939 V-toothpicks after 31 rounds of the honeycomb sequence.

=== 940s ===
==== 940 ====
940 = 2^{2} × 5 × 47. It is the totient sum for the first 55 integers.

==== 941 ====
941 is a prime number, a Chen prime, and an Eisenstein prime with no imaginary part. It is the sum of three consecutive primes (311 + 313 + 317) and the sum of five consecutive primes (179 + 181 + 191 + 193 + 197).

==== 942 ====
942 = 2 × 3 × 157. It is a sphenic number, a convolved Fibonacci number, a nontotient, and the sum of four consecutive primes (229 + 233 + 239 + 241).

==== 943 ====
943 = 23 × 41.

==== 944 ====
944 = 2^{4} × 59. It is a nontotient and a Lehmer-Comtet number.

==== 945 ====
945 is an odd composite number. 945 is also a Leyland number, the double factorial of the number 9, a denominator of $\zeta (2 \times 3)$, the total number of leaf-labeled rooted binary trees with 6 leaves.

945 is the first and smallest odd abundant number, primitive abundant number, primitive semiperfect number, and primitive pseudoperfect number.

==== 946 ====
946 = 2 × 11 × 43. It is a sphenic number, a hexagonal number, a happy number, and the 43rd triangular number.

==== 947 ====
947 is a prime number, a balanced prime, a Chen prime, a lazy caterer number, an Eisenstein prime with no imaginary part, and the sum of seven consecutive primes (113 + 127 + 131 + 137 + 139 + 149 + 151).

==== 948 ====
948 = 2^{2} × 3 × 79. It is a nontotient. It forms a Ruth–Aaron pair with 949 under the second definition. There are 948 combinatory separations of normal multisets of weight 6.

==== 949 ====
949 = 13 × 73. It forms a Ruth–Aaron pair with 948 under the second definition.

=== 950s ===
==== 950 ====
950 = 2 × 5^{2} × 19. It is a nontotient and a generalized pentagonal number.

==== 951 ====
951 = 3 × 317. It is a centered pentagonal number.

==== 952 ====
952 = 2^{3} × 7 × 17. There are 952 reduced words of length 3 in the Weyl group D_17. There are 952 regions in regular tetradecagon with all diagonals drawn.

==== 953 ====
953 is a prime number, a Sophie Germain prime, a Chen prime, an Eisenstein prime with no imaginary part, and a centered heptagonal number.

==== 954 ====
954 = 2 × 3^{2} × 53. It is a nontotient, a Harshad number, and the sum of ten consecutive primes (73 + 79 + 83 + 89 + 97 + 101 + 103 + 107 + 109 + 113). It is sixth derivative of x^(x^x) evaluated at x=1.

==== 955 ====
955 = 5 × 191. There are 955 transitive rooted trees with 17 nodes.

==== 956 ====
956 = 2^{2} × 239. There are 956 compositions of 13 into powers of 2.

==== 957 ====
957 = 3 × 11 × 29 = antisigma(45). It is a sphenic number.

==== 958 ====
958 = 2 × 479. It is a nontotient and a Smith number.

It is the millesimal fineness number for Britannia silver

==== 959 ====
959 = 7 × 137. It is a composite de Polignac number.

=== 960s ===
==== 960 ====
960 = 2^{6} × 3 × 5. It is aHarshad number and the sum of six consecutive primes (149 + 151 + 157 + 163 + 167 + 173).

There are 960 possible starting positions for the chess variant Chess960.

==== 961 ====
961 = 31^{2}. It is the largest 3-digit perfect square and a centered octagonal number. It is the sum of three consecutive primes (313 + 317 + 331) and the sum of five consecutive primes (181 + 191 + 193 + 197 + 199).

==== 962 ====
962 = 2 × 13 × 37. It is a sphenic number and a nontotient.

==== 963 ====
963 = 3^{2} × 107. It is the sum of the first 24 primes.

==== 964 ====
964 = 2^{2} × 241. It is a happy number, a nontotient, the totient sum of the first 56 integers, and the sum of four consecutive primes (233 + 239 + 241 + 251).

==== 965 ====
965 = 5 × 193.

==== 966 ====
966 = 2 × 3 × 7 × 23 = $\left\{ {8 \atop 3} \right\}$. It is a Harshad number and the sum of eight consecutive primes (103 + 107 + 109 + 113 + 127 + 131 + 137 + 139).

==== 967 ====
967 is a prime number and a prime index prime.

==== 968 ====
968 = 2^{3} × 11^{2}. It is a nontotient and an Achilles number.

==== 969 ====
969 = 3 × 17 × 19. It is a sphenic number, a nonagonal number, and a tetrahedral number.

- age of Methuselah according to Old Testament, anti-Muslim movement in Myanmar

=== 970s ===
==== 970 ====
970 = 2 × 5 × 97. It is a sphenic number and a heptagonal number.

==== 971 ====
971 is a prime number, an emirp, a Chen prime, and an Eisenstein prime with no imaginary part.

==== 972 ====
972 = 2^{2} × 3^{5}. It is a Harshad number and an Achilles number.

- 972 has Anti-Factors = 5, 8, 24, 29, 67, 72, 216, 389, 648
- The Sum of Anti-Factors of 972 = number * (n/2) where n is an Odd number. So, it is a Hemi-Anti-Perfect Number. Other such Numbers include 2692, etc.

Sum of Anti-Factors = 5 + 8 + 24 + 29 + 67 + 72 + 216 + 389 + 648 = 1458 = 972 * 3/2

==== 973 ====
973 = 7 × 139. It is a happy number.

==== 974 ====
974 = 2 × 487. It is a nontotient.

974! - 1 is prime.

==== 975 ====
975 = 3 × 5^{2} × 13.

==== 976 ====
976 = 2^{4} × 61. It is a decagonal number.

==== 977 ====
977 is a prime number, a balanced prime, a Chen prime, an Eisenstein prime with no imaginary part, a Stern prime, and the sum of nine consecutive primes (89 + 97 + 101 + 103 + 107 + 109 + 113 + 127 + 131). It is a strictly non-palindromic number.

==== 978 ====
978 = 2 × 3 × 163. It is a sphenic number and a nontotient.

There are 978 secondary structures of RNA molecules with 11 nucleotides.

==== 979 ====
979 = 11 × 89. It is the sum of the five smallest fourth powers: $979=\sum_{n=1}^{5}n^4$.

=== 980s ===
==== 980 ====
980 = 2^{2} × 5 × 7^{2}. There are 980 ways to tile a hexagon of edge 3 with calissons of side 1.

==== 981 ====
981 = 3^{2} × 109.

==== 982 ====
982 = 2 × 491.

==== 983 ====
983 is a prime number, a safe prime, a Chen prime, and an Eisenstein prime with no imaginary part. It is a Wedderburn–Etherington number and a strictly non-palindromic number.

==== 984 ====
984 = 2^{3} × 3 × 41.

==== 985 ====
985 = 5 × 197. It is a Markov number, a Pell number, a Smith number, and the sum of three consecutive primes (317 + 331 + 337).

==== 986 ====
986 = 2 × 17 × 29. It is a sphenic number, a strobogrammatic number, and a nontotient. There are 986 unimodal compositions of 14 where the maximal part appears once.

==== 987 ====
987 = 3 × 7 × 47. It is a deficient number, a sphenic number, and the 16th number of the Fibonacci sequence. There are 987 partitions of 52 into prime parts.

==== 988 ====
988 = 2^{2} × 13 × 19. It is a nontotient, a cake number, and the sum of four consecutive primes (239 + 241 + 251 + 257).

==== 989 ====
989 = 23 × 43. It is an extra strong Lucas pseudoprime.

=== 990s ===
==== 990 ====
990 = 2 × 3^{2} × 5 × 11. It is a Harshad number, the 44th triangular number, and the sum of six consecutive primes (151 + 157 + 163 + 167 + 173 + 179).

The highest possible VantageScore credit score is 990.

==== 991 ====
991 is a prime number, a Chen prime, a lucky prime, and a prime index prime. It is the sum of five consecutive primes (191 + 193 + 197 + 199 + 211) and the sum of seven consecutive primes (127 + 131 + 137 + 139 + 149 + 151 + 157).

==== 992 ====
992 = 2^{5} × 31. It is a pronic number and a nontotient. There are 992 eleven-dimensional exotic spheres.

==== 993 ====
993 = 3 × 331.

==== 994 ====
994 = 2 × 7 × 71. It is a sphenic number and a nontotient. There are 994 binary words of length 13 with all distinct runs.

==== 995 ====
995 = 5 × 199.

==== 996 ====
996 = 2^{2} × 3 × 83.

==== 997 ====
997 is the largest three-digit prime number, a lucky prime, and a strictly non-palindromic number.

==== 998 ====
998 = 2 × 499. It is a nontotient. There are 998 7-node graphs with two connected components.
