= 600 (number) =

← 599	600	601 →
- List of numbers; Integers; ← 0 100 200 300 400 500 600 700 800 900 →
- Cardinal: six hundred
- Ordinal: 600th (six hundredth)
- Factorization: 2^{3} × 3 × 5^{2}
- Divisors: 1, 2, 3, 4, 5, 6, 8, 10, 12, 15, 20, 24, 25, 30, 40, 50, 60, 75, 100, 120, 150, 200, 300, 600
- Greek numeral: Χ´
- Roman numeral: DC, dc
- Binary: 1001011000_{2}
- Ternary: 211020_{3}
- Senary: 2440_{6}
- Octal: 1130_{8}
- Duodecimal: 420_{12}
- Hexadecimal: 258_{16}
- Armenian: Ո
- Hebrew: ת"ר / ם
- Babylonian cuneiform: 𒌋
- Egyptian hieroglyph: 𓍧

600 (six hundred) is the natural number following 599 and preceding 601.

== Mathematical properties ==
Six hundred is a composite number, an abundant number, a pronic number, a Harshad number and a largely composite number.

== Credit ==
In the United States, a credit score of 600 or below is considered poor, limiting available credit at a normal interest rate

== Integers from 601 to 699 ==
=== 600s ===
==== 601 ====
601 is a prime number and a centered pentagonal number.

==== 602 ====
602 = 2 × 7 × 43. It is a nontotient. There are 602 cubes of edge length 1 required to make a hollow cube of edge length 11

==== 603 ====
603 = 3^{2} × 67. It is a Harshad number and a Riordan number.

==== 604 ====
604 = 2^{2} × 151. It is a nontotient and the totient sum for first 44 integers.

==== 605 ====
605 = 5 × 11^{2}. It is a Harshad number and the sum of the nontriangular numbers between the two successive triangular numbers 55 and 66. There are 605 non-isomorphic set-systems of weight 9.

==== 606 ====
606 = 2 × 3 × 101. It is a sphenic number, an admirable number and the sum of six consecutive primes (89 + 97 + 101 + 103 + 107 + 109).

606 is one of the numbers associated with Christ - ΧϚʹ - see the Greek numerals Isopsephy and the reason why other numbers siblings with this one are Beast's numbers.

==== 607 ====
607 is a prime number, a balanced prime, a Mersenne prime exponent, the sum of three consecutive primes (197 + 199 + 211), a zero of Mertens function and a strictly non-palindromic number

==== 608 ====
608 = 2^{5} × 19. It is a nontotient, a happy number, and a zero of the Mertens function. There are 608 regions formed by drawing the line segments connecting any two of the perimeter points of a 3 times 4 grid of squares

==== 609 ====
609 = 3 × 7 × 29. It is a sphenic number and a strobogrammatic number.

=== 610s ===
==== 610 ====
610 =2 × 5 × 61. It is a deficient number, a Markov number, a sphenic number, and a member of the Fibonacci sequence.

==== 611 ====
611 = 13 × 47. It is the sum of the three standard board sizes in Go (9^{2} + 13^{2} + 19^{2}).

The 611th tribonacci number is prime.

==== 612 ====
612 = 2^{2} × 3^{2} × 17. It is a Harshad number, an untouchable number, and a Zuckerman number (sequence A007602 in the OEIS).

==== 614 ====
614 = 2 × 307. It is a nontotient and a 2-Knödel number.

According to Rabbi Emil Fackenheim, the number of Commandments in Judaism should be 614 rather than the traditional 613.

==== 615 ====
615 = 3 × 5 × 41. It is a sphenic number.

==== 616 ====
616 = 2^{3} × 7 × 11. It is a Padovan number and a balanced number.

616 is an alternative value for the Number of the Beast (more commonly accepted to be 666)

==== 617 ====
617 is a prime number, a Chen prime, an Eisenstein prime with no imaginary part, a super-prime, an index of prime Lucas number, and the sum of five consecutive primes (109 + 113 + 127 + 131 + 137).

There are 617 compositions of 17 into distinct parts.

==== 618 ====
618 = 2 × 3 × 103. It is a sphenic number and an admirable number.

==== 619 ====
619 is a prime number, a strobogrammatic prime, and an alternating factorial.

=== 620s ===
==== 620 ====
620 = 2^{2} × 5 × 31. It is the sum of four consecutive primes (149 + 151 + 157 + 163) and the sum of eight consecutive primes (61 + 67 + 71 + 73 + 79 + 83 + 89 + 97).

The sum of the first 620 primes is itself prime.

==== 621 ====
621 = 3^{3} × 23. It is a Harshad number, and it is the discriminant of a totally real cubic field.

==== 622 ====
622 = 2 × 311. It isa nontotient and a fine number (sequence A000957 in the OEIS).

==== 623 ====
623 = 7 × 89. There are 623 partitions of 23 into an even number of parts.

==== 624 ====
624 = 2^{4} × 3 × 13. It is a Harshad number, a Zuckerman number and the sum of a twin prime pair (311 + 313).

624=J_{4}(5).

==== 625 ====
625 = 25^{2} = 5^{4} It is a centered octagonal number, a 1-automorphic number, a Friedman number because 625 = 5^{6−2}, the sum of seven consecutive primes (73 + 79 + 83 + 89 + 97 + 101 + 103).

It is one of the two three-digit numbers that when squared or raised to a higher power that end in the same three digits, the other being 376.

==== 626 ====
626 = 2 × 313. It is a nontotient and a 2-Knödel number,

- Stitch's experiment number

==== 627 ====
627 = 3 × 11 × 19. It is a sphenic number and a Smith number There are 627 integer partitions of 20.

==== 628 ====
628 = 2^{2} × 157. It is a nontotient and the totient sum for first 45 integers.

==== 629 ====
629 = 17 × 37. It is a highly cototient number and a Harshad number. There are 629 diagonals in a 37-gon.

=== 630s ===
==== 630 ====
630 = 2 × 3^{2} × 5 × 7. It is a hexagonal number, a sparsely totient number, a Harshad number, a balanced number, a largely composite number, the 35th triangular number, and the sum of six consecutive primes (97 + 101 + 103 + 107 + 109 + 113).

==== 631 ====
631 is a prime number, a Cuban prime, a Lucky prime a Chen prime, a centered triangular number, a centered hexagonal number, and a lazy caterer number (sequence A000124 in the OEIS).

==== 632 ====
632 = 2^{3} × 79. It is a refactorable number. There are 632 13-bead necklaces with 2 colors

==== 633 ====
633 = 3 × 211. It is a Blum integer and the sum of three consecutive primes (199 + 211 + 223).

==== 634 ====
634 = 2 × 317. It is a nontotient and a Smith number.

==== 635 ====
635 = 5 × 127. It is a zero of the Mertens function and the sum of nine consecutive primes (53 + 59 + 61 + 67 + 71 + 73 + 79 + 83 + 89).

There are 635 compositions of 13 into pairwise relatively prime parts. 635/504 ≈ ∛2

==== 636 ====
636 = 2^{2} × 3 × 53. It is a Smith number, a zero of the Mertens function, and the sum of ten consecutive primes (43 + 47 + 53 + 59 + 61 + 67 + 71 + 73 + 79 + 83).

==== 637 ====
637 = 7^{2} × 13. It is a decagonal number and a zero of the Mertens function.

==== 638 ====
638 = 2 × 11 × 29. It is a sphenic number, a nontotient, a centered heptagonal number, and the sum of four consecutive primes (151 + 157 + 163 + 167).

==== 639 ====
639 = 3^{2} × 71. It is the sum of the first twenty primes.

=== 640s ===
==== 640 ====
640 = 2^{7} × 5. It is a Harshad number, a refactorable number, and a hexadecagonal number

There are 640 1s in all partitions of 24 into odd parts, There are 640 acres in a square mile.

==== 641 ====
641 is a prime number, a Sophie Germain prime, a Chen prime, an Eisenstein prime with no imaginary part and a Proth prime. It is a factor of 4294967297, the smallest nonprime Fermat number.

==== 642 ====
642 = 2 × 3 × 107. It is a sphenic number and an admirable number.

642= 1^{4} + 2^{4} + 5^{4}, making 642 a counterexample of

==== 643 ====
643 is a prime number.

==== 644 ====
644 = 2^{2} × 7 × 23. It is a nontotient, a Perrin number, a Harshad number, an admirable number and a common umask.

==== 645 ====
645 = 3 × 5 × 43. It is a sphenic number, an octagonal number, a Smith number, a Harshad number and a Fermat pseudoprime to base 2.

==== 646 ====
646 = 2 × 17 × 19. It is a sphenic number

There are 646 permutations of length 7 without rising or falling successions.

==== 647 ====
647 is a Chen prime, an Eisenstein prime with no imaginary part, and the sum of five consecutive primes (113 + 127 + 131 + 137 + 139).

3^{647} - 2^{647} is prime

==== 648 ====
648 = 2^{3} × 3^{4}. It is a Harshad number and an Achilles number.

==== 649 ====
649 = 11 × 59. It is a Blum integer.

=== 650s ===
==== 650 ====
650 = 2 × 5^{2} × 13. It is a primitive abundant number, a square pyramidal number, a pronic number, a nontotient an admirable number, and the totient sum for first 46 integers.

==== 651 ====
651 = 3 × 7 × 31. It is a sphenic number, a pentagonal number, and a nonagonal number.

==== 652 ====
652 = 2^{2} × 163. It is the maximal number of regions by drawing 26 circles

==== 653 ====
653 is a prime number, a Sophie Germain prime, a balanced prime, a Chen prime, and an Eisenstein prime with no imaginary part.

==== 654 ====
654 = 2 × 3 × 109. It is a sphenic number, a nontotient, a Smith number, and an admirable number

==== 655 ====
655 = 5 × 131. There are 655 toothpicks after 20 stages in a three-dimensional grid.

==== 656 ====
656 = 2^{4} × 41 = $\lfloor \frac{3^{16}}{2^{16}} \rfloor$,

In Judaism, Jerusalem is mentioned in the Hebrew Bible and the Old Testament a total of 656 times.

==== 657 ====
657 = 3^{2} × 73. It is the largest known number not of the form a^{2}+s with s a semiprime

==== 658 ====
658 = 2 × 7 × 47. It is a sphenic number and an untouchable number.

==== 659 ====
659 is a prime number, a Sophie Germain prime, a Chen prime an Eisenstein prime with no imaginary part, strictly non-palindromic number, highly cototient number, and the sum of seven consecutive primes (79 + 83 + 89 + 97 + 101 + 103 + 107).

Mertens function sets a new low of −10 at 659 which stands until 661.

=== 660s ===
==== 660 ====
660 = 2^{2} × 3 × 5 × 11. It is a sparsely totient number, a Harshad number, and a largely composite number. It is the sum of four consecutive primes (157 + 163 + 167 + 173), the sum of six consecutive primes (101 + 103 + 107 + 109 + 113 + 127), and the sum of eight consecutive primes (67 + 71 + 73 + 79 + 83 + 89 + 97 + 101). It is the sum of 11th row when writing the natural numbers as a triangle.

==== 661 ====
661 is:

- a prime number
- the sum of three consecutive primes (211 + 223 + 227)
- a Pentagram number of the form $5n^{2}-5n+1$
- a Hexagram number of the form $6n^{2}-6n+1$ i.e. a star number

Mertens function sets new low of −11 at 661 which stands until 665.

==== 662 ====
662 = 2 × 331. It is a nontotient and a member of Mian–Chowla sequence.

==== 663 ====
663 = 3 × 13 × 17. It is a sphenic number and a Smith number.

==== 664 ====
664 = 2^{3} × 83. It is a refactorable number.

There are 664 knapsack partitions of 33.

==== 665 ====
665 = 5 × 7 × 19. It is a sphenic number.

There are 665 diagonals in a 38-gon. Mertens function sets new low of −12 at 665 which stands until 1105.

==== 667 ====
667 = 23 × 29. It is a lazy caterer number.

==== 668 ====
668 = 2^{2} × 167. It is a nontotient.

==== 669 ====
669 = 3 × 223. It is a Blum integer.

=== 670s ===
==== 670 ====
670 = 2 × 5 × 67. It is a sphenic number, an octahedral number, and a nontotient.

==== 671 ====
671 = 11 × 61.

The magic constant of n×n normal magic square and n-queens problem for n = 11 is 671.

==== 672 ====
672 = 2^{5} × 3 × 7. It is a harmonic divisor number, a Zuckerman number, an admirable number, a largely composite number, and a triperfect number.

==== 673 ====
673 is a prime number, a lucky prime, and a Proth prime.

==== 674 ====
674 = 2 × 337. It is a nontotient and a 2-Knödel number.

==== 675 ====
675 = 3^{3} × 5^{2}. It is an Achilles number.

==== 676 ====
676 = 2^{2} × 13^{2} = 26^{2}. It is a palindromic square.

==== 677 ====
677 is a prime number, a Chen prime, and an Eisenstein prime with no imaginary part.

There are 677 non-isomorphic self-dual multiset partitions of weight 10.

==== 678 ====
678 = 2 × 3 × 113. It is a sphenic number, a nontotient, and an admirable number.

There are 678 surface points of an octahedron with side length 13.

==== 679 ====
679 = 7 × 97. It is the sum of three consecutive primes (223 + 227 + 229) and the sum of nine consecutive primes (59 + 61 + 67 + 71 + 73 + 79 + 83 + 89 + 97). It is the smallest number of multiplicative persistence 5.

=== 680s ===
==== 680 ====
680 = 2^{3} × 5 × 17. It is a tetrahedral number and a nontotient.

==== 681 ====
681 = 3 × 227. It is a centered pentagonal number.

==== 682 ====
682 = 2 × 11 × 31. It is a sphenic number, the sum of four consecutive primes (163 + 167 + 173 + 179), and the sum of ten consecutive primes (47 + 53 + 59 + 61 + 67 + 71 + 73 + 79 + 83 + 89).

Solving the Norwegian puzzle strikketoy requires 682 moves.

==== 683 ====
683 is a prime number, a Sophie Germain prime, a Chen prime, an Eisenstein prime with no imaginary part, a Wagstaff prime, and the sum of five consecutive primes (127 + 131 + 137 + 139 + 149).

==== 684 ====
684 = 2^{2} × 3^{2} × 19. It is a Harshad number.

There are 684 graphical forest partitions of 32.

==== 685 ====
685 = 5 × 137 It is a centered square number.

==== 686 ====
686 = 2 × 7^{3}.It is a nontotient. There are 686 multigraphs on infinite set of nodes with 7 edges.

==== 687 ====
687 = 3 × 229. It is a D-number. Mars takes 687 days to orbit around the sun.

==== 688 ====
688 = 2^{4} × 43. It is a 2-automorphic number, and a Friedman number since 688 = 8 × 86.

==== 689 ====
689 = 13 × 53. It is a Strobogrammatic number, the sum of three consecutive primes (227 + 229 + 233), and the sum of seven consecutive primes (83 + 89 + 97 + 101 + 103 + 107 + 109).

=== 690s ===
==== 690 ====
690 = 2 × 3 × 5 × 23. It is a sparsely totient number, a Smith number, a Harshad number, and the sum of six consecutive primes (103 + 107 + 109 + 113 + 127 + 131).

==== 691 ====
691 is a prime number.

Ramanujan's tau function τ and the divisor function σ_{11} are related by the congruence τ(n) ≡ σ_{11}(n) (mod 691).

Negative 691 is the numerator of the Bernoulli number B_{12} = -691/2730. In number theory, 691 is a "marker" (similar to the radioactive markers in biology): whenever it appears in a computation, it is a sign that Bernoulli numbers are involved.

==== 692 ====
692 = 2^{2} × 173. There are 692 partitions of 48 into powers of 2.

==== 693 ====
693 = 3^{2} × 7 × 11.

693 appears as the first three digits after the decimal point in the decimal form for the natural logarithm of 2. To 10 digits, this number is 0.6931471805. As a result, if an event has a constant probability of 0.1% of occurring, 693 is the smallest number of trials that must be performed for there to be at least a 50% chance that the event occurs at least once. More generally, for any probability p, the probability that the event occurs at least once in a sample of n items, assuming the items are independent, is given by the following formula:

1 − (1 − p)^{n}

For p = 10^{−3} = 0.001, plugging in n = 692 gives, to four decimal places, 0.4996, while n = 693 yields 0.5001.

693 is a palindrome in binary in bases 32, 62, 76, 98, 230, and 692.

==== 694 ====
694 = 2 × 347. It is a centered triangular number, a nontotient, and the smallest pandigital number in base 5.

==== 695 ====
695 = 5 × 139.

695!! + 2 is prime.

==== 696 ====
696 = 2^{3} × 3 × 29. It is the totient sum for first 47 integers, the sum of a twin prime pair (347 + 349), and the sum of eight consecutive primes (71 + 73 + 79 + 83 + 89 + 97 + 101 + 103). There are 696 trails of length 9 on honeycomb lattice.

==== 697 ====
697 = 17 × 41. It is a cake number.The US state of Colorado has 697 sides.

==== 698 ====
698 = 2 × 349. It is a nontotient and the sum of squares of two primes.

==== 699 ====
699 = 3 × 233. It is a D-number.
