= Truncatable prime =

Type of number

In number theory, a left-truncatable prime is a prime number which, in a given base, contains no 0, and if the leading ("left") digit is successively removed, then all resulting numbers are prime. For example, 9137, since 9137, 137, 37 and 7 are all prime. Decimal representation is often assumed and always used in this article.

A right-truncatable prime is a prime which remains prime when the last ("right") digit is successively removed. 7393 is an example of a right-truncatable prime, since 7393, 739, 73, and 7 are all prime.

A left-and-right-truncatable prime is a prime which remains prime if the leading ("left") and last ("right") digits are simultaneously successively removed down to a one- or two-digit prime. 1825711 is an example of a left-and-right-truncatable prime, since 1825711, 82571, 257, and 5 are all prime.

In base 10, there are exactly 4260 left-truncatable primes, 83 right-truncatable primes, and 920,720,315 left-and-right-truncatable primes.

== History ==
Author Leslie E. Card in early volumes of the Journal of Recreational Mathematics (which started its run in 1968) considered a topic close to that of right-truncatable primes, calling sequences that by adding digits to the right in sequence to an initial number not necessarily prime snowball primes.

Discussion of the topic dates to at least November 1969 issue of Mathematics Magazine, where truncatable primes were called prime primes by two co-authors (Murray Berg and John E. Walstrom).

== Decimal truncatable primes ==
There are 4260 left-truncatable primes:

2, 3, 5, 7, 13, 17, 23, 37, 43, 47, 53, 67, 73, 83, 97, 113, 137, 167, 173, 197, 223, 283, 313, 317, 337, 347, 353, 367, 373, 383, 397, 443, 467, 523, 547, 613, 617, 643, 647, 653, 673, 683, 743, 773, 797, 823, 853, 883, 937, 947, 953, 967, 983, 997, ... (sequence A024785 in the OEIS)

The largest is the 24-digit 357686312646216567629137.

There are 83 right-truncatable primes. The complete list:

2, 3, 5, 7, 23, 29, 31, 37, 53, 59, 71, 73, 79, 233, 239, 293, 311, 313, 317, 373, 379, 593, 599, 719, 733, 739, 797, 2333, 2339, 2393, 2399, 2939, 3119, 3137, 3733, 3739, 3793, 3797, 5939, 7193, 7331, 7333, 7393, 23333, 23339, 23399, 23993, 29399, 31193, 31379, 37337, 37339, 37397, 59393, 59399, 71933, 73331, 73939, 233993, 239933, 293999, 373379, 373393, 593933, 593993, 719333, 739391, 739393, 739397, 739399, 2339933, 2399333, 2939999, 3733799, 5939333, 7393913, 7393931, 7393933, 23399339, 29399999, 37337999, 59393339, 73939133 (sequence A024770 in the OEIS)

The largest is the 8-digit 73939133. All primes above 5 end with digit 1, 3, 7 or 9, so a right-truncatable prime can only contain those digits after the leading digit.

There are 920,720,315 left-and-right-truncatable primes:

2, 3, 5, 7, 11, 13, 17, 19, 23, 29, 31, 37, 41, 43, 47, 53, 59, 61, 67, 71, 73, 79, 83, 89, 97, 127, 131, 137, 139, 151, 157, 173, 179, 223, 227, 229, 233, 239, 251, 257, 271, 277, 331, 337, 353, 359, 373, 379, 421, 431, 433, 439, 457, 479, 521, 523, 557, 571, 577, 631, 653, 659, 673, 677, 727, 733, 739, 751, 757, 773, 821, 823, 827, 829, 839, 853, 857, 859, 877, 929, 937, 953, 971, 977, 1117, 1171, 1193, 1231, 1237, 1291, 1297, 1319, 1373, 1433, 1439, 1471, 1531, 1597, 1613, 1619, ... (sequence A077390 in the OEIS)

There are 331,780,864 left-and-right-truncatable primes with an odd number of digits. The largest is the 97-digit prime 7228828176786792552781668926755667258635743361825711373791931117197999133917737137399993737111177.

There are 588,939,451 left-and-right-truncatable primes with an even number of digits. The largest is the 104-digit prime 91617596742869619884432721391145374777686825634291523771171391111313737919133977331737137933773713713973.

There are 15 primes which are both left-truncatable and right-truncatable. They have been called two-sided primes. The complete list:

2, 3, 5, 7, 23, 37, 53, 73, 313, 317, 373, 797, 3137, 3797, 739397 (sequence A020994 in the OEIS)

A left-truncatable prime is called restricted if all of its left extensions are composite i.e. there is no other left-truncatable prime of which this prime is the left-truncated "tail". Thus 7937 is a restricted left-truncatable prime because the nine 5-digit numbers ending in 7937 are all composite, whereas 3797 is a left-truncatable prime that is not restricted because 33797 is also prime.

There are 1442 restricted left-truncatable primes:

2, 5, 773, 3373, 3947, 4643, 5113, 6397, 6967, 7937, 15647, 16823, 24373, 33547, 34337, 37643, 56983, 57853, 59743, 62383, 63347, 63617, 69337, 72467, 72617, 75653, 76367, 87643, 92683, 97883, 98317, ... (sequence A240768 in the OEIS)

Similarly, a right-truncatable prime is called restricted if all of its right extensions are composite. There are 27 restricted right-truncatable primes:

53, 317, 599, 797, 2393, 3793, 3797, 7331, 23333, 23339, 31193, 31379, 37397, 73331, 373393, 593993, 719333, 739397, 739399, 2399333, 7393931, 7393933, 23399339, 29399999, 37337999, 59393339, 73939133 (sequence A239747 in the OEIS)

== Other bases ==
While the primality of a number does not depend on the numeral system used, truncatable primes are defined only in relation with a given base. A variation involves removing 2 or more decimal digits at a time. This is mathematically equivalent to using base 100 or a larger power of 10, with the restriction that base 10^{n} digits must be at least 10^{n−1}, in order to match a decimal n-digit number with no leading 0.

== See also ==
- Permutable prime
