= Square-free element =

Mathematical concept

In mathematics, a square-free element is an element r of a unique factorization domain R that is not divisible by a non-trivial square. This means that every s such that $s^2\mid r$ is a unit of R.

== Alternate characterizations ==
Square-free elements may be also characterized using their prime decomposition. The unique factorization property means that a non-zero non-unit r can be represented as a product of prime elements

$$r=p_1p_2\cdots p_n$$

Then r is square-free if and only if the primes p_{i} are pairwise non-associated (i.e. that it doesn't have two of the same prime as factors, which would make it divisible by a square number).

== Examples ==
Common examples of square-free elements include square-free integers and square-free polynomials.

== See also ==
- Prime number
