= Achilles number =

Numbers with special prime factorization

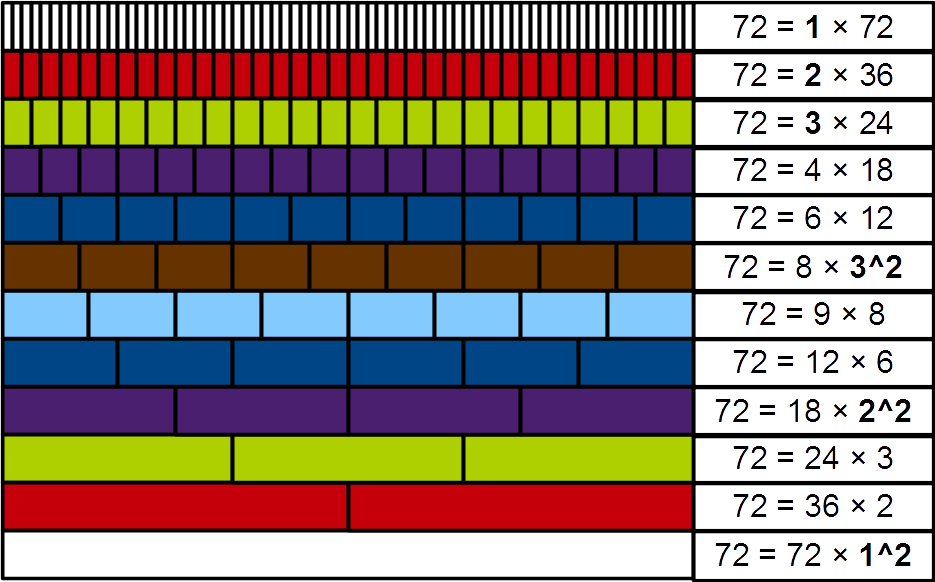
Demonstration, with Cuisenaire rods, of the number 72 being powerful

An Achilles number is a number that is powerful but not a perfect power. A positive integer n is a powerful number if, for every prime factor p of n, p^{2} is also a divisor. In other words, every prime factor appears at least squared in the factorization. All Achilles numbers are powerful. However, not all powerful numbers are Achilles numbers. Powerful numbers that can be represented as m^{k}, where m and k are positive integers greater than 1 are not Achilles numbers.

Achilles numbers were named by Henry Bottomley after Achilles, a hero of the Trojan War, who was also powerful but imperfect. Strong Achilles numbers are Achilles numbers whose Euler totients are also Achilles numbers; the smallest are 500 and 864.

== Sequence of Achilles numbers ==
A number n = p_{1}^{a_{1}}p_{2}^{a_{2}}…p_{k}^{a_{k}} is powerful if min(a_{1}, a_{2}, …, a_{k}) ≥ 2. If in addition gcd(a_{1}, a_{2}, …, a_{k}) = 1 the number is an Achilles number.

The Achilles numbers up to 5000 are:

72, 108, 200, 288, 392, 432, 500, 648, 675, 800, 864, 968, 972, 1125, 1152, 1323, 1352, 1372, 1568, 1800, 1944, 2000, 2312, 2592, 2700, 2888, 3087, 3200, 3267, 3456, 3528, 3872, 3888, 4000, 4232, 4500, 4563, 4608, 5000 (sequence A052486 in the OEIS).

The sequence grows as O(n^{2}/log log n), and the sum of reciprocals is approximately 0.069132.

The smallest pair of consecutive Achilles numbers is:

5425069447 = 7^{3} × 41^{2} × 97^{2}
5425069448 = 2^{3} × 26041^{2}

== Examples ==
As an example, 108 is a powerful number. Its prime factorization is 2^{2} · 3^{3}, and thus its prime factors are 2 and 3. Both 2^{2} = 4 and 3^{2} = 9 are divisors of 108. However, 108 cannot be represented as m^{k}, where m and k are positive integers greater than 1, so 108 is an Achilles number.

The integer 360 is not an Achilles number because it is not powerful. One of its prime factors is 5 but 360 is not divisible by 5^{2} = 25 and leaves a remainder of 10.

On the contrary, 784 is not an Achilles number. It is a powerful number, because not only are 2 and 7 its only prime factors, but also 2^{2} = 4 and 7^{2} = 49 are divisors of it. It is a perfect power:

$$784=2^4 \cdot 7^2 = (2^2)^2 \cdot 7^2 = (2^2 \cdot 7)^2 = 28^2. \,$$

So it is not an Achilles number.

The integer 500 = 2^{2} × 5^{3} is a strong Achilles number as its Euler totient of 200 = 2^{3} × 5^{2} is also an Achilles number.

Another case is that of 72, which is the only Achilles number from 1 to 100. Since 72 = 2^{3} × 3^{2} and its not a perfect power, 72 is an Achilles number.
