= 800 (number) =

← 799	800	801 →
- List of numbers; Integers; ← 0 100 200 300 400 500 600 700 800 900 →
- Cardinal: eight hundred
- Ordinal: 800th (eight hundredth)
- Factorization: 2^{5} × 5^{2}
- Divisors: 1, 2, 4, 5, 8, 10, 16, 20, 25, 32, 40, 50, 80, 100, 160, 200, 400, 800
- Greek numeral: Ω´
- Roman numeral: DCCC, dccc
- Binary: 1100100000_{2}
- Ternary: 1002122_{3}
- Senary: 3412_{6}
- Octal: 1440_{8}
- Duodecimal: 568_{12}
- Hexadecimal: 320_{16}
- Armenian: Պ
- Hebrew: ת"ת / ף
- Babylonian cuneiform: 𒌋𒐗⟪
- Egyptian hieroglyph: 𓍩

800 (eight hundred) is the natural number following 799 and preceding 801.

== In mathematics ==
It is the sum of four consecutive primes (193 + 197 + 199 + 211). It is a Harshad number, an Achilles number, and the area of a square with diagonal 40.

== Integers from 801 to 899 ==
=== 800s ===
==== 801 ====
801 = 3 × 3 × 89. It is a Harshad number. 801 is the sum of a square and positive cube in more than one way, and a sum of distinct positive cubes in more than one way:

$$801 = 17^2 + 8^3 = 26^2 + 5^3 = 1^3 + 2^3 + 4^3 + 6^3 + 8^3 = 2^3 + 4^3 + 9^3.$$

In the gematria of 2nd century bishop Irenaeus, 801 stands for both the Greek word for a dove, and for Alpha and Omega, and therefore represents God in two ways.

There are 801 club patterns in a 50x50 grid of coins.

==== 802 ====
802 = 2 × 401. It is a nontotient, a happy number, the sum of eight consecutive primes (83 + 89 + 97 + 101 + 103 + 107 + 109 + 113), and the sum of 4 consecutive triangular numbers (171 + 190 + 210 + 231).

==== 803 ====
803 = 11 × 73. It is a Harshad number, the sum of three consecutive primes (263 + 269 + 271), and the sum of nine consecutive primes (71 + 73 + 79 + 83 + 89 + 97 + 101 + 103 + 107).

There are 803 partitions of 34 into Fibonacci parts.

==== 804 ====
804 = 2^{2} × 3 × 67. It is a nontotient, a Harshad number, and a refactorable number.

"The 804" is a local nickname for the Greater Richmond Region of the U.S. state of Virginia, derived from its telephone area code (although the area code covers a larger area).

==== 805 ====
805 = 5 × 7 × 23. It is a sphenic number. There are 805 partitions of 38 into nonprime parts

==== 806 ====
806 = 2 × 13 × 31. It is a sphenic number, a nontotient, a happy number, and the totient sum for first 51 integers.

806 = Phi(51)

==== 807 ====
807 = 3 × 269 = antisigma(42)

==== 808 ====
808 = 2^{3} × 101. It is a refactorable number and a strobogrammatic number.

==== 809 ====
809 is a prime number, a Sophie Germain prime, a Chen prime, and an Eisenstein prime with no imaginary part.

=== 810s ===
==== 810 ====
810 = 2 × 3^{4} × 5. It is a harshad number. There are 810 non-equivalent ways of expressing 100,000 as the sum of two prime numbers. There are 810 distinct reduced words of length 5 in the Coxeter group of "Apollonian reflections" in three dimensions.

==== 811 ====
811 is a prime number, a twin prime, a Chen prime, the largest minimal prime in base 9, and the sum of five consecutive primes (151 + 157 + 163 + 167 + 173). It is a happy number and a zero of Mertens function.

==== 812 ====
812 = 2^{2} × 7 × 29. It is an admirable number, a pronic number, a balanced number, and a zero of Mertens function.

==== 813 ====
813 = 3 × 271. It is a Blum integer.

==== 814 ====
814 = 2 × 11 × 37. It is a sphenic number, a nontotient, and a zero of Mertens function. There are 814 fixed hexahexes.

==== 815 ====
815 = 5 × 163. There are 815 graphs with 8 vertices and a distinguished bipartite block.

==== 816 ====
816 = 2^{4} × 3 × 17. It is a tetrahedral number, a Padovan number, and a Zuckerman number.

==== 817 ====
817 = 19 × 43. It is a centered hexagonal number and the sum of three consecutive primes (269 + 271 + 277).

==== 818 ====
818 = 2 × 409. It is a nontotient and a strobogrammatic number

==== 819 ====
819 = 3^{2} × 7 × 13. It is a square pyramidal number.

=== 820s ===
==== 820 ====
820 = 2^{2} × 5 × 41. It is a Harshad number, a happy number, a repdigit (1111) in base 9, and the 40th triangular number.

==== 821 ====
821 is a prime number, a twin prime, a Chen prime, and an Eisenstein prime with no imaginary part. It forms a prime quadruplet with 823, 827, and 829. It is a lazy caterer number.

==== 822 ====
822 = 2 × 3 × 137. It is a sphenic number, a member of the Mian–Chowla sequence, and the sum of twelve consecutive primes (43 + 47 + 53 + 59 + 61 + 67 + 71 + 73 + 79 + 83 + 89 + 97).

==== 823 ====
823 is a prime number, a twin prime, and a lucky prime. It forms a prime quadruplet with 821, 827, and 829. It is a zero of Mertens function.

==== 824 ====
824 = 2^{3} × 103, refactorable number, nontotient, a zero of Mertens function, and the sum of ten consecutive primes (61 + 67 + 71 + 73 + 79 + 83 + 89 + 97 + 101 + 103).

==== 825 ====
825 = 3 × 5^{2} × 11. It is a Smith number, a Harshad number, and a zero of Mertens function.

==== 826 ====
826 = 2 × 7 × 59. It is a sphenic number. There are 825 partitions of 29 into parts each of which is used a different number of times.

==== 827 ====
827 is a prime number, a twin prime, a Chen prime, a Eisenstein prime with no imaginary part, and the sum of seven consecutive primes (103 + 107 + 109 + 113 + 127 + 131 + 137). It forms a prime quadruplet with 821, 823, and 829. It is a strictly non-palindromic number.

==== 828 ====
828 = 2^{2} × 3^{2} × 23. It is a Harshad number and a triangular matchstick number.

==== 829 ====
829 is a prime number, a twin prime, a Chen prime, and the sum of three consecutive primes (271 + 277 + 281). It forms a prime quadruplet with 821, 823, and 827. It is a centered triangular number.

=== 830s ===
==== 830 ====
830 = 2 × 5 × 83. It is a sphenic number, a nontotient, the totient sum of the first 52 integers, and the sum of four consecutive primes (197 + 199 + 211 + 223).

==== 831 ====
831 = 3 × 277. There are 831 partitions of 32 into at most 5 parts.

==== 832 ====
832 = 2^{6} × 13. It is a Harshad number and a member of the Horadam sequence (0,1,4,2).

==== 833 ====
833 = 7^{2} × 17. It is an octagonal number and a centered octahedral number.

==== 834 ====
834 = 2 × 3 × 139. It is a cake number, a sphenic number, a nontotient, and the sum of six consecutive primes (127 + 131 + 137 + 139 + 149 + 151).

==== 835 ====
835 = 5 × 167. It is a Motzkin number.

==== 837 ====
837 = 3^{3} × 31. It is the 36th generalized heptagonal number.

==== 838 ====
838 = 2 × 419. It is a palindromic number. There are 838 distinct products ijk with 1 <= i<j<k <= 23.

==== 839 ====
839 is a prime number, a safe prime, a Chen prime, an Eisenstein prime with no imaginary part, and the sum of five consecutive primes (157 + 163 + 167 + 173 + 179). It is a highly cototient number.

=== 840s ===
==== 841 ====
841 = 29^{2} = 20^{2} + 21^{2}, sum of three consecutive primes (277 + 281 + 283), sum of nine consecutive primes (73 + 79 + 83 + 89 + 97 + 101 + 103 + 107 + 109), centered square number, centered heptagonal number, centered octagonal number

==== 842 ====
842 = 2 × 421. It is a nontotient. There are 842 series-reduced trees with 18 nodes.

842!! - 1 is prime.

==== 843 ====
843 = 3 × 281. It is a Lucas number.

==== 844 ====
844 = 2^{2} × 211. It is a nontotient. It is the smallest 5 consecutive integers which are not squarefree:

844 = 2^{2} × 211, 845 = 5 × 13^{2}, 846 = 2 × 3^{2} × 47, 847 = 7 × 11^{2}, and 848 = 2^{4} × 53.

==== 845 ====
845 = 5 × 13^{2}. It is a concentric pentagonal number.There are 845 emergent parts in all partitions of 22.

==== 846 ====
846 = 2 × 3^{2} × 47. It is a nontotient, a Harshad number, and the sum of eight consecutive primes (89 + 97 + 101 + 103 + 107 + 109 + 113 + 127).

==== 847 ====
847 = 7 × 11^{2}. It is a happy number. There are 847 partitions of 29 that do not contain 1 as a part.

==== 848 ====
848 = 2^{4} × 53. It is an untouchable number.

==== 849 ====
849 = 3 × 283, It is a zero of Mertens function and a Blum integer.

=== 850s ===
==== 850 ====
850 = 2 × 5^{2} × 17. It is a zero of Mertens function and a nontotient. The sum of the squares of the divisors of 26 is 850 (sequence A001157 in the OEIS).

The maximum possible Fair Isaac credit score is 850.

==== 851 ====
851 = 23 × 37 There are 851 compositions of 18 into distinct parts

==== 852 ====
852 = 2^{2} × 3 × 71. It is a pentagonal number and a Smith number.

==== 853 ====
853 is a prime number, a Perrin number, a zero of Mertens function, and a strictly non-palindromic number. The average of first 853 prime numbers is an integer (sequence A045345 in the OEIS). There are 853 connected graphs with 7 nodes.

==== 854 ====
854 = 2 × 7 × 61. It is a sphenic number and a nontotient. There are 854 unlabeled planar trees with 11 nodes.

==== 855 ====
855 = 3^{2} × 5 × 19. It is a decagonal number and a centered cube number.

==== 856 ====
856 = 2^{3} × 107. It is a nonagonal number, a centered pentagonal number, and a refactorable number.

==== 857 ====
857 is a prime number, a Chen prime, an Eisenstein prime with no imaginary part, and the sum of three consecutive primes (281 + 283 + 293).

==== 858 ====
858 = 2 × 3 × 11 × 13. It is a Giuga number.

==== 859 ====
859 is a prime number and a prime index prime. There are 859 planar partitions of 11.

=== 860s ===
==== 860 ====
860 = 2^{2} × 5 × 43. It is aHoax number and the sum of four consecutive primes (199 + 211 + 223 + 227).

==== 861 ====
861 = 3 × 7 × 41. It is a sphenic number, a hexagonal number, a Smith number, and the 41st triangular number.

==== 862 ====
862 = 2 × 431. It is a lazy caterer number.

==== 863 ====
863 is a prime number, a safe prime, a Chen prime, an Eisenstein prime with no imaginary part, and an index of a prime Lucas number.It is the sum of five consecutive primes (163 + 167 + 173 + 179 + 181) and the sum of seven consecutive primes (107 + 109 + 113 + 127 + 131 + 137 + 139).

==== 864 ====
864 = 2^{5} × 3^{3}. It is an Achilles number and a Harshad number. It the sum of a twin prime pair (431 + 433) and the sum of six consecutive primes (131 + 137 + 139 + 149 + 151 + 157).

==== 865 ====
865 = 5 × 173.

==== 866 ====
866 = 2 × 433. It is a nontotient and the number of cubes of edge length 1 required to make a hollow cube of edge length 13. There are 866 one-sided noniamonds.

==== 867 ====
867 = 3 × 17^{2}. There are 867 5-chromatic simple graphs on 8 nodes.

==== 868 ====
868 = 2^{2} × 7 × 31 = J_{3}(10). It is a nontotient.

==== 869 ====
869 = 11 × 79. It is a zero of Mertens function.

=== 870s ===
==== 870 ====
870 = 2 × 3 × 5 × 29. It is a pronic number, a nontotient, a sparsely totient number, a Harshad number, and the sum of ten consecutive primes (67 + 71 + 73 + 79 + 83 + 89 + 97 + 101 + 103 + 107). It is the magic constant of n×n normal magic square and n-queens problem for n = 12.

==== 871 ====
871 = 13 × 67. It is the thirteenth tridecagonal number.

==== 872 ====
872 = 2^{3} × 109. It is a refactorable number and anontotient.

872! + 1 is prime.

==== 873 ====
873 = 3^{2} × 97 = 1! + 2! + 3! + 4! + 5! + 6!.

==== 874 ====
874 = 2 × 19 × 23 = 0! + 1! + 2! + 3! + 4! + 5! + 6!. It is a sphenic number, a nontotient, a Harshad number, a happy number, and the sum of the first twenty-three primes.

==== 875 ====
875 = 5^{3} × 7. It can be uniquely expressed as a difference of two positive cubes: 875 = 10^{3} – 5^{3}.

==== 876 ====
876 = 2^{2} × 3 × 73. It is a generalized pentagonal number.

==== 877 ====
877 is a prime number, a prime index prime, a Chen prime, a zero of Mertens function, a Bell number, and a strictly non-palindromic number.

==== 878 ====
878 = 2 × 439. It is a nontotient. There are 878 Pythagorean triples with a hypotenuse less than 1000.

==== 879 ====
879 = 3 × 293. It is a candidate Lychrel seed number. There are 879 regular hypergraphs spanning 4 vertices.

=== 880s ===
==== 880 ====
880 = 2^{4} × 5 × 11 = 11!!!. It is a Harshad number and a 148-gonal number. There are 880 n×n magic squares for n = 4.

==== 881 ====
881 is a prime number, a twin prime, a Chen prime, an Eisenstein prime with no imaginary part, and the sum of nine consecutive primes (79 + 83 + 89 + 97 + 101 + 103 + 107 + 109 + 113). It is a happy number.

881 is a bilingual play on words when text chatting in Mandarin Chinese or bilingually Mandarin Chinese and English. "881" is pronounced ba ba yi in Mandarin, and thus puns on "bye-bye." Probably an elaboration of the similar pun on "88" (ba-ba). See 88 (number).

==== 882 ====
882 = 2 × 3^{2} × 7^{2} = $\binom{9}{5}_2$ It is a trinomial coefficient, a Harshad number, and the totient sum of the first 53 integers.

==== 883 ====
883 is a prime number, a twin prime, a lucky prime, the sum of three consecutive primes (283 + 293 + 307), and the sum of eleven consecutive primes (59 + 61 + 67 + 71 + 73 + 79 + 83 + 89 + 97 + 101 + 103). It is a zero of Mertens function.

==== 884 ====
884 = 2^{2} × 13 × 17. It is a zero of Mertens function. There are 884 points on surface of tetrahedron with sidelength 21.

==== 885 ====
885 = 3 × 5 × 59. It is a sphenic number. There are 885 series-reduced rooted trees whose leaves are integer partitions whose multiset union is an integer partition of 7.

==== 886 ====
886 = 2 × 443. It is a zero of Mertens function.

==== 887 ====
887 is a prime number followed by primal gap of 20, a safe prime, a Chen prime, and an Eisenstein prime with no imaginary part. It is the first iteration of the 196 trajectory (196 + 691 = 887).

==== 889 ====
889 = 7 × 127. It is a zero of Mertens function.

=== 890s ===
==== 890 ====
890 = 2 × 5 × 89. It is a sphenic number, a nontotient, and the sum of four consecutive primes (211 + 223 + 227 + 229). 890 is the sum of the squares of two successive primes: 890 = 19^{2} + 23^{2}.

==== 891 ====
891 = 3^{4} × 11. It is an octahedral number and the sum of five consecutive primes (167 + 173 + 179 + 181 + 191).

==== 892 ====
892 = 2^{2} × 223. It is a nontotient. There are 892 regions formed by drawing the line segments connecting any two perimeter points of a 6 times 2 grid of squares like this (sequence A331452 in the OEIS).

==== 893 ====
893 = 19 × 47. It is a zero of Mertens function.

893 is considered an unlucky number in Japan, because its digits read sequentially are the literal translation of yakuza.

==== 894 ====
894 = 2 × 3 × 149. It is a sphenic number and a nontotient.

==== 895 ====
895 = 5 × 179. It is a Smith number, a Woodall number, and a zero of Mertens function.

==== 896 ====
896 = 2^{7} × 7. It is a refactorable number, a zero of Mertens function, and the sum of six consecutive primes (137 + 139 + 149 + 151 + 157 + 163).

==== 897 ====
897 = 3 × 13 × 23. It is a sphenic number and a Cullen number (sequence A002064 in the OEIS).

==== 898 ====
898 = 2 × 449. It is a nontotient and a zero of Mertens function.

==== 899 ====
899 = 29 × 31. It is the product of a pair of twin primes, a happy number, and the smallest number with digit sum 26. There are 899 partitions of 51 into prime parts.
