= Refactorable number =

Integer divisible by the number of its divisors

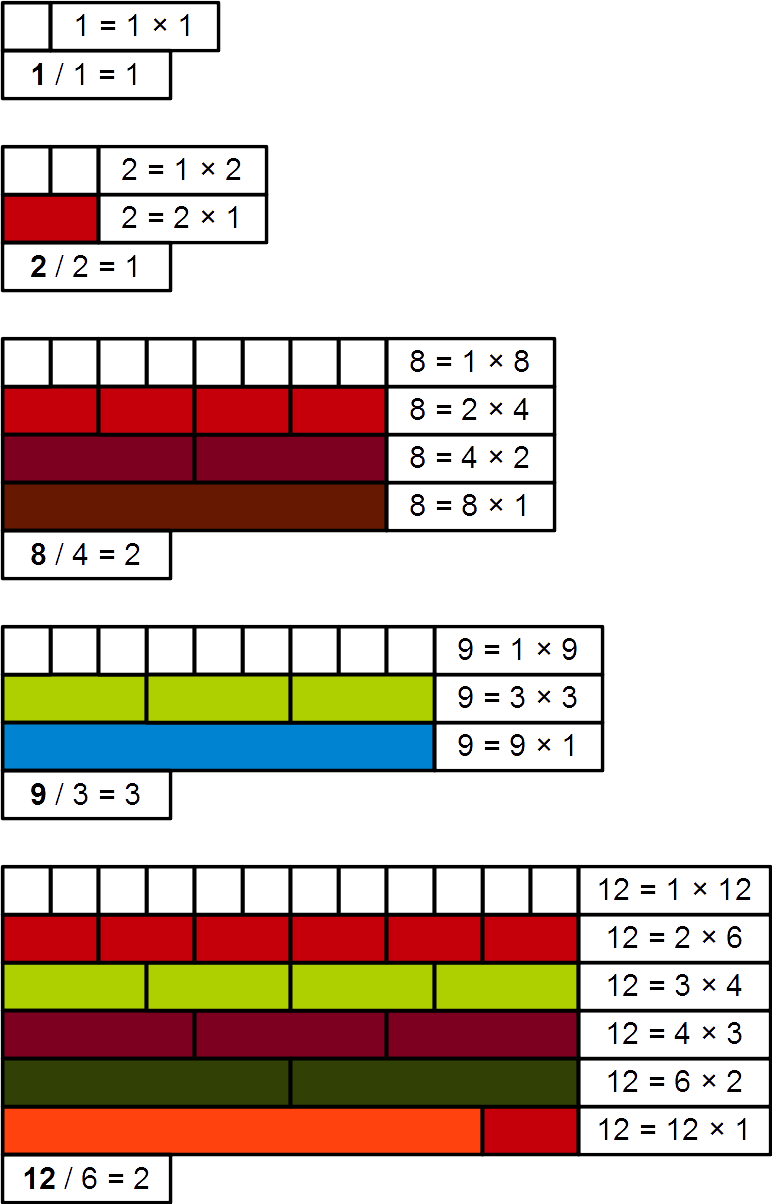
Demonstration, with Cuisenaire rods, that 1, 2, 8, 9, and 12 are refactorable

A refactorable number or tau number is an integer n that is divisible by the count of its divisors, or to put it algebraically, n is such that $\tau(n)\mid n$ with $\tau(n)=\sigma_0(n)=\prod_{i=1}^{n}(e_i+1)$ for $n=\prod_{i=1}^np_i^{e_i}$. The first few refactorable numbers are listed in (sequence A033950 in the OEIS) as

1, 2, 8, 9, 12, 18, 24, 36, 40, 56, 60, 72, 80, 84, 88, 96, 104, 108, 128, 132, 136, 152, 156, 180, 184, 204, 225, 228, 232, 240, 248, 252, 276, 288, 296, ...

For example, 18 has 6 divisors (1 and 18, 2 and 9, 3 and 6) and is divisible by 6. There are infinitely many refactorable numbers.

== Properties ==
Cooper and Kennedy proved that refactorable numbers have natural density zero. Zelinsky proved that no three consecutive integers can all be refactorable. Colton proved that no refactorable number is perfect. The equation $\gcd(n,x) = \tau(n)$ has solutions only if $n$ is a refactorable number, where $\gcd$ is the greatest common divisor function.

Let $T(x)$ be the number of refactorable numbers which are at most $x$. The problem of determining an asymptotic for $T(x)$ is open. Spiro has proven that $T(x) = \frac{x}{\sqrt{\log x} (\log \log x)^{1-o(1)}}$

There are still unsolved problems regarding refactorable numbers. Colton asked if there are arbitrarily large $n$ such that both $n$ and $n + 1$ are refactorable. Zelinsky wondered if there exists a refactorable number $n_0 \equiv a \mod m$, does there necessarily exist $n > n_0$ such that $n$ is refactorable and $n \equiv a \mod m$.

== History ==
First defined by Curtis Cooper and Robert E. Kennedy where they showed that the tau numbers have natural density zero, they were later rediscovered by Simon Colton using a computer program he wrote ("HR") which invents and judges definitions from a variety of areas of mathematics such as number theory and graph theory. Colton called such numbers "refactorable". While computer programs had discovered proofs before, this discovery was one of the first times that a computer program had discovered a new or previously obscure idea. Colton proved many results about refactorable numbers, showing that there were infinitely many and proving a variety of congruence restrictions on their distribution. Colton was only later alerted that Kennedy and Cooper had previously investigated the topic.

== See also ==
- Divisor function
