= Hexagonal number =

Type of figurate number

Proof without words that a hexagonal number (middle column) can be rearranged as rectangular and odd-sided triangular numbers

A hexagonal number is a figurate number. The nth hexagonal number h_{n} is the number of distinct dots in a pattern of dots consisting of the outlines of regular hexagons with sides up to n dots, when the hexagons are overlaid so that they share one vertex.

The first four hexagonal numbers.

The formula for the nth hexagonal number

$$h_n= 2n^2-n = n(2n-1) = \frac{2n(2n-1)}{2}.$$

The first few hexagonal numbers (sequence A000384 in the OEIS) are:

1, 6, 15, 28, 45, 66, 91, 120, 153, 190, 231, 276, 325, 378, 435, 496, 561, 630, 703, 780, 861, 946...

Every hexagonal number is a triangular number, but only every other triangular number (the 1st, 3rd, 5th, 7th, etc.) is a hexagonal number. Like a triangular number, the digital root in base 10 of a hexagonal number can only be 1, 3, 6, or 9. The digital root pattern, repeating every nine terms, is "1 6 6 1 9 3 1 3 9".

Every even perfect number is hexagonal, given by the formula

$$M_p 2^{p-1} = M_p \frac{M_p + 1}{2} = h_{(M_p+1)/2}=h_{2^{p-1}}$$
where M_{p} is a Mersenne prime. No odd perfect numbers are known, hence all known perfect numbers are hexagonal.
For example, the 2nd hexagonal number is 2×3 = 6; the 4th is 4×7 = 28; the 16th is 16×31 = 496; and the 64th is 64×127 = 8128.

The largest number that cannot be written as a sum of at most four hexagonal numbers is 130. Adrien-Marie Legendre proved in 1830 that any integer greater than 1791 can be expressed in this way.

In addition, only two integers cannot be expressed using five hexagonal numbers (but can be with six), those being 11 and 26.

Hexagonal numbers should not be confused with centered hexagonal numbers, which model the packing of Vienna sausages found in North American canned varieties of the product. To avoid ambiguity, hexagonal numbers are sometimes called "cornered hexagonal numbers".

== Test for hexagonal numbers ==
One can efficiently test whether a positive integer x is a hexagonal number by computing

$$n = \frac{\sqrt{8x+1}+1}{4}.$$

If n is an integer, then x is the nth hexagonal number. If n is not an integer, then x is not hexagonal.

== Congruence relations ==
- $h_n \equiv n \pmod{4}$
- $h_{3n}+h_{2n}+h_{n} \equiv 0 \pmod{2}$

== Other properties ==
=== Expression using sigma notation ===
The nth number of the hexagonal sequence can also be expressed by using sigma notation as

$$h_n = \sum_{k=0}^{n-1}{(4k+1)}$$

where the empty sum is taken to be 0.

=== Sum of the reciprocal hexagonal numbers ===
The sum of the reciprocal hexagonal numbers is 2ln(2), where ln denotes natural logarithm.

$$\begin{align} \sum_{k=1}^{\infty} \frac{1}{k(2k-1)} &= \lim_{n \to \infty}2\sum_{k=1}^{n} \left(\frac{1}{2k-1} - \frac{1}{2k} \right)\\                            &= \lim_{n \to \infty}2\sum_{k=1}^{n} \left(\frac{1}{2k-1} +  \frac{1}{2k} - \frac{1}{k} \right)\\ &= 2 \lim_{n \to \infty}\left(\sum_{k=1}^{2n}\frac{1}{k} - \sum_{k=1}^{n}\frac{1}{k}\right)\\                                                         &= 2 \lim_{n \to \infty}\sum_{k=1}^{n}\frac{1}{n+k} \\ &= 2 \lim_{n \to \infty}\frac{1}{n}\sum_{k=1}^{n}\frac{1}{1+\frac{k}{n}}\\ &= 2 \int_{0}^{1}\frac{1}{1+x}dx \\ &= 2 [ \ln(1+x) ]_{0}^{1} \\ &= 2 \ln{2}\\
& \approx{1.386294}
\end{align}$$

=== Multiplying the index ===
Using rearrangement, the next set of formulas is given:

$h_{2n} = 4h_n+2n$

$h_{3n} = 9h_n+6n$

$...$

$h_{m*n} = m^{2}h_n+(m^{2}-m)n$

=== Ratio relation ===
Using the final formula from before with respect to m and then n, and then some reducing and moving, one can get to the following equation:

$\frac{h_{m}+m}{h_{n}+n}=\left(\frac{m}{n}\right)^2$

=== Numbers of divisors of powers of certain natural numbers ===
$12^{n-1}$ for n>0 has $h_n$ divisors.

Likewise, for any natural number of the form $r = p^2 q$ where p and q are distinct prime numbers, $r^{n-1}$ for n>0 has $h_n$ divisors.

Proof. $r^{n-1} = (p^2 q)^{n-1} = p^{2(n-1)} q^{n-1}$ has divisors of the form $p^k q^l$, for k = 0 ... 2(n − 1), l = 0 ... n − 1. Each combination of k and l yields a distinct divisor, so $r^{n-1}$ has $[2(n - 1) + 1] [(n - 1) + 1]$ divisors, i.e. $(2n - 1) n = h_n$ divisors. ∎

== Hexagonal square numbers ==
The sequence of numbers that are both hexagonal and perfect squares starts 1, 1225, 1413721,... OEIS: A046177.

== See also ==
- Centered hexagonal number
