= Mian–Chowla sequence =

Sequence of numbers with distinct sums

In mathematics, the Mian–Chowla sequence is an integer sequence defined recursively in the following way. The sequence starts with

$$a_1 = 1.$$

Then for $n>1$, $a_n$ is the smallest integer such that every pairwise sum

$$a_i + a_j$$

is distinct, for all $i$ and $j$ less than or equal to $n$.

== Properties ==
Initially, with $a_1$, there is only one pairwise sum, 1 + 1 = 2. The next term in the sequence, $a_2$, is 2 since the pairwise sums then are 2, 3 and 4, i.e., they are distinct. Then, $a_3$ can't be 3 because there would be the non-distinct pairwise sums 1 + 3 = 2 + 2 = 4. We find then that $a_3 = 4$, with the pairwise sums being 2, 3, 4, 5, 6 and 8. The sequence thus begins

1, 2, 4, 8, 13, 21, 31, 45, 66, 81, 97, 123, 148, 182, 204, 252, 290, 361, 401, 475, ... (sequence A005282 in the OEIS).

== Similar sequences ==
If we define $a_1 = 0$, the resulting sequence is the same except each term is one less (that is, 0, 1, 3, 7, 12, 20, 30, 44, 65, 80, 96, ... OEIS: A025582).

== History ==
The sequence was invented by Abdul Majid Mian and Sarvadaman Chowla.
