= Sphenic number =

Positive integer that is the product of three distinct prime numbers

In number theory, a sphenic number (from Ancient Greek: σφήν, 'wedge') is a positive integer that is the product of three distinct prime numbers. For example, since 2, 3, and 73 are all prime, 438 is a sphenic number because 2 × 3 × 73 = 438. Because there are infinitely many prime numbers, there are also infinitely many sphenic numbers.

== Definition ==
A sphenic number is a product pqr where p, q, and r are three distinct prime numbers. In other words, the sphenic numbers are the square-free 3-almost primes.

== Examples ==
The smallest sphenic number is 30 = 2 × 3 × 5, the product of the smallest three primes. The first few sphenic numbers are

30, 42, 66, 70, 78, 102, 105, 110, 114, 130, 138, 154, 165, ... (sequence A007304 in the OEIS)

The largest known sphenic number at any time can be obtained by multiplying together the three largest known primes.

== Divisors ==
All sphenic numbers have exactly eight divisors. If we express the sphenic number as n = p × q × r, where p, q, and r are distinct primes, then the set of divisors of n will be:

$\left\{ 1, \ p, \ q, \ r, \ pq, \ pr, \ qr, \ n \right\}.$

The converse does not hold. For example, 24 is not a sphenic number, but it has exactly eight divisors.

== Properties ==
All sphenic numbers are by definition squarefree, because the prime factors must be distinct.

The Möbius function of any sphenic number is −1.

The cyclotomic polynomials $\Phi_n(x)$, taken over all sphenic numbers n, may contain arbitrarily large coefficients (for n a product of two primes the coefficients are $\pm 1$ or 0).

Any multiple of a sphenic number (except by 1) is not sphenic. This is easily provable by the multiplication process at a minimum adding another prime factor, or raising an existing factor to a higher power.

== Consecutive sphenic numbers ==
The first case of two consecutive sphenic integers is 230 = 2 × 5 × 23 and 231 = 3 × 7 × 11. The first case of three is 1309 = 7 × 11 × 17, 1310 = 2 × 5 × 131, and 1311 = 3 × 19 × 23. There is no case of more than three, because every fourth consecutive positive integer is divisible by 4 = 2 × 2 and therefore not squarefree (sequence A291466 in the OEIS).

The numbers 2013 = 3 × 11 × 61, 2014 = 2 × 19 × 53, and 2015 = 5 × 13 × 31 are all sphenic. The next three consecutive sphenic years will be 2665 = 5 × 13 × 41, 2666 = 2 × 31 × 43 and 2667 = 3 × 7 × 127 (sequence A165936 in the OEIS).

== See also ==
- Semiprimes, products of two prime numbers.
- Almost prime
