= Chen prime =

Prime number p where p+2 is prime or semiprime

- Named after: Chen Jingrun
- Publication year: 1973
- Author of publication: Chen, J. R.
- First terms: 2, 3, 5, 7, 11, 13
- OEIS index: A109611; Chen primes: primes p such that p + 2 is either a prime or a semiprime

In mathematics, a prime number p is called a Chen prime if p + 2 is either a prime or a product of two primes (also called a semiprime). The even number 2p + 2 therefore satisfies Chen's theorem.

The Chen primes are named after Chen Jingrun, who proved in 1966 that there are infinitely many such primes. This result would also follow from the truth of the twin prime conjecture as the lower member of a pair of twin primes is by definition a Chen prime.

The first few Chen primes are

2, 3, 5, 7, 11, 13, 17, 19, 23, 29, 31, 37, 41, 47, 53, 59, 67, 71, 83, 89, 101, ... (sequence A109611 in the OEIS).

The first few Chen primes that are not the lower member of a pair of twin primes are

2, 7, 13, 19, 23, 31, 37, 47, 53, 67, 83, 89, 109, 113, 127, ... (sequence A063637 in the OEIS).

The first few non-Chen primes are

43, 61, 73, 79, 97, 103, 151, 163, 173, 193, 223, 229, 241, ... (sequence A102540 in the OEIS).

All of the supersingular primes are Chen primes.

Rudolf Ondrejka discovered the following 3 × 3 magic square of nine Chen primes:

17	89	71
113	59	5
47	29	101

As of March 2018, the largest known Chen prime is 2996863034895 × 2^{1290000} − 1, with 388342 decimal digits.

The sum of the reciprocals of Chen primes converges.

== Further results ==
Chen also proved the following generalization: For any even integer h, there exist infinitely many primes p such that p + h is either a prime or a semiprime.

Ben Green and Terence Tao showed that the Chen primes contain infinitely many arithmetic progressions of length 3. Binbin Zhou generalized this result by showing that the Chen primes contain arbitrarily long arithmetic progressions.
