= 1,000,000,000 =

1000000000
- List of numbers; Integers; ← 10^{0} 10^{1} 10^{2} 10^{3} 10^{4} 10^{5} 10^{6} 10^{7} 10^{8} 10^{9} 10^{10} 10^{11} 10^{12} 10^{13}
- Cardinal: One billion (short scale); One milliard (long scale); One thousand million
- Ordinal: One billionth (short scale)
- Factorization: 2^{9}; 5^{9}
- Greek numeral: $\stackrel{\iota}{\Mu}$
- Roman numeral: M
- Binary: 111011100110101100101000000000_{2}
- Ternary: 2120200200021010001_{3}
- Senary: 243121245344_{6}
- Octal: 7346545000_{8}
- Duodecimal: 23AA93854_{12}
- Hexadecimal: 3B9ACA00_{16}

1,000,000,000 ("one billion" on the short scale; "one milliard" on the long scale; one thousand million) is the natural number following 999,999,999 and preceding 1,000,000,001. With a number, "billion" can be abbreviated as b, bil or bn.

In standard form, it is written as 1 × 10^{9}. The metric prefix giga indicates 1,000,000,000 times the base unit. Its symbol is G.

One billion years may be called an eon in astronomy or geology.

Previously in British English (but not in American English), the word "billion" referred exclusively to a million millions (1,000,000,000,000). However, this is not common anymore, and the word has been used to mean one thousand million (1,000,000,000) for several decades.

The term milliard could also be used to refer to 1,000,000,000; whereas "milliard" is rarely used in English, variations on this name often appear in other languages.

In the Indian numbering system, it is known as 100 crore or 1 arab.

1,000,000,000 is also the cube of 1000.

It is a common metric used in macroeconomics when describing national economies.

== Sense of scale ==
Visualization of powers of ten from one to 1 billion

The facts below give a sense of how large 1,000,000,000 (10^{9}) is, according to current scientific evidence:

=== Time ===
- 10^{9} seconds (1 gigasecond) equal 11,574 days, 1 hour, 46 minutes and 40 seconds (approximately 31.7 years, or 31 years, 8 months, 8 days).
- About 10^{9} minutes ago, the Roman Empire was flourishing and Christianity was emerging. (10^{9} minutes is roughly 1,901 years.)
- About 10^{9} hours ago, modern human beings and their ancestors were living in the Stone Age (more precisely, the Middle Paleolithic). (10^{9} hours is roughly 114,080 years.)
- About 10^{9} days ago, Australopithecus, an ape-like creature related to an ancestor of modern humans, roamed the African savannas. (10^{9} days is roughly 2.738 million years.)
- About 10^{9} months ago, dinosaurs walked the Earth during the late Cretaceous. (10^{9} months is roughly 83.3 million years.)
- About 10^{9} years—a gigaannus—ago, the first multicellular eukaryotes appeared on Earth.
- About 10^{9} decades ago, the thin disk of the Milky Way started to form. (10^{9} decades is exactly 10 billion years.)
- The universe is thought to be about 13.8 × 10^{9} years old.

=== Distance ===
- 10^{9} inches is 15,783 miles (25,400 km), more than halfway around the world and thus sufficient to reach any point on the globe from any other point.
- 10^{9} metres (called a gigametre) is almost three times the distance from the Earth to the Moon.
- 10^{9} kilometres (called a terametre) is over six times the distance from the Earth to the Sun.

=== Area ===
- A billion square inches could make a square about one half mile on a side.
- A bolt of finely woven 1000-TC bed sheet linen with a billion thread crossings would have an area of 40 square metres (48 sq yd), comparable to the floor area of a motel unit.

=== Volume ===
- There are one billion cubic millimetres in a cubic metre, and a billion cubic metres in a cubic kilometre.
- A billion grains of table salt or granulated sugar would occupy a volume of about 2.5 cubic feet (0.071 m^{3}).
- A billion cubic inches would be a volume comparable to a large commercial building slightly larger than a typical supermarket.

=== Weight ===
- Any object that weighs one billion kilograms (2.2×10^{9} lb) would weigh about as much as 5,525 empty Boeing 747-400s.
- A cube of iron that weighs one billion pounds (450,000,000 kg) would be 38.62 metres (126.7 ft) on each side.

=== Products ===
- As of July 2016, Apple has sold one billion iPhones. This makes the iPhone one of the most successful product lines in history, surpassing the PlayStation and the Rubik's Cube.
- As of January 2025, Facebook has 3.065 billion users.

=== Nature ===
- A small mountain, slightly larger than Stone Mountain in Georgia, United States, would weigh (have a mass of) a billion tons.
- There are billions of worker ants in the largest ant colony in the world, which covers almost 4,000 miles (6,400 km) of the Mediterranean coast.
- In 1804, the world population was one billion.

=== Count ===
A is a cube; B consists of 1000 cubes the size of cube A, C consists of 1000 cubes the size of cube B; and D consists of 1000 cubes the size of cube C. Thus there are 1 million A-sized cubes in C; and 1,000,000,000 A-sized cubes in D.

== Selected 10-digit numbers (1,000,000,000–9,999,999,999) ==
=== 1,000,000,000 to 1,999,999,999 ===
- 1,000,000,007 : smallest prime number with 10 digits.
- 1,000,006,281 : smallest triangular number with 10 digits and the 44,721st triangular number.
- 1,000,014,129 = 31623^{2}, the smallest ten-digit square.
- 1,026,753,849 = 32043^{2}, the smallest pandigital square in base 10.
- 1,069,863,695 : number of square (0,1)-matrices without zero rows and with exactly 9 entries equal to 1
- 1,073,741,824 = 2^{30}.
- 1,073,742,724 : Leyland number using 2 and 30 (2^{30} + 30^{2})
- 1,073,792,449 : Leyland number using 4 and 15 (4^{15} + 15^{4})
- 1,093,104,961 : number of (unordered, unlabeled) rooted trimmed trees with 28 nodes
- 1,096,671,326 : number of uniform rooted trees with 26 nodes
- 1,104,891,746 : number of partially ordered set with 12 unlabeled elements
- 1,129,760,415 : 23rd Motzkin number.
- 1,134,903,170 : 45th Fibonacci number.
- 1,162,268,326 : Leyland number using 3 and 19 (3^{19} + 19^{3})
- 1,163,962,800 : smallest superabundant number that is not highly composite
- 1,166,732,814 : number of signed trees with 17 nodes
- 1,167,812,894 : Leyland number using 2 and 30 (2^{30} + 30^{3})
- 1,173,741,824 : Leyland number using 8 and 10 (8^{10} + 10^{8})
- 1,221,074,418 : Leyland number using 5 and 13 (5^{13} + 13^{5})
- 1,311,738,121 : 25th Pell number.
- 1,382,958,545 : 15th Bell number.
- 1,392,251,012 : number of secondary structures of RNA molecules with 27 nucleotides
- 1,405,695,061 : Markov prime.
- 1,406,818,759 : 30th Wedderburn–Etherington number.
- 1,464,407,113 : number of series-reduced trees with 39 nodes
- 1,533,776,805 : both pentagonal and triangular.
- 1,597,463,007 : Decimal representation of 0x5f3759df.
- 1,631,432,881 = 40391^{2}, square triangular number
- 1,673,196,525 : Least common multiple of the odd integers from 1 to 25
- 1,677,922,740 : number of series-reduced planted trees with 36 nodes
- 1,755,206,648 : coefficient of a ménage hit polynomial
- 1,767,263,190 : The 19th Catalan number.
- 1,787,109,376 : 1-automorphic number
- 1,808,141,741 : number of partitions of 280 into divisors of 280
- 1,808,676,326 : number of 38-bead necklaces (turning over is allowed) where complements are equivalent
- 1,836,311,903 : 46th Fibonacci number.
- 1,848,549,332 : number of partitions of 270 into divisors of 270
- 1,857,283,156 : number of 37-bead binary necklaces with beads of 2 colors where the colors may be swapped but turning over is not allowed
- 1,882,341,361 : The smallest prime whose reversal is a square triangular number (triangular of 57121).
- 1,921,525,212 : number of partitions of 264 into divisors of 264
- 1,934,502,740 : number of parallelogram polyominoes with 27 cells.
- 1,979,339,339 : largest right-truncatable prime in decimal, if 1 is considered to be a prime
- 1,996,813,914 : Leyland number using 7 and 11 (7^{11} + 11^{7})

=== 2,000,000,000 to 2,999,999,999 ===
- 2,023,443,032 : number of trees with 28 unlabeled nodes
- 2,038,074,743 : 100,000,000th prime number
- 2,062,142,876 : number of centered hydrocarbons with 30 carbon atoms
- 2,147,483,647 : 8th Mersenne prime and 3rd double Mersenne prime.
- 2,147,483,648 = 2^{31}
- 2,147,484,609 : Leyland number using 2 and 31 (2^{31} + 31^{2})
- 2,176,782,336 = 6^{12}.
- 2,179,768,320 : Leyland number using 6 and 12 (6^{12} + 12^{6})
- 2,214,502,422 : 6th primary pseudoperfect number.
- 2,276,423,485 : number of ways to partition {1,2,...,12} and then partition each cell (block) into subcells.
- 2,521,008,887 : 4th Mills' prime
- 2,695,730,992 : number of (unordered, unlabeled) rooted trimmed trees with 29 nodes
- 2,870,671,950 : number of free 20-ominoes
- 2,873,403,980 : number of uniform rooted trees with 27 nodes
- 2,834,510,744 : number of nonequivalent dissections of a 22-gon into 19 polygons by non-intersecting diagonals up to rotation
- 2,971,215,073 : 11th Fibonacci prime (47th Fibonacci number) and a Markov prime.

=== 3,000,000,000 to 3,999,999,999 ===
- 3,166,815,962 : 26th Pell number.
- 3,192,727,797 : 24th Motzkin number.
- 3,323,236,238 : 31st Wedderburn–Etherington number.
- 3,405,691,582 = CAFEBABE_{16}; used as a magic debug value in programming.
- 3,405,697,037 = CAFED00D_{16}; used as a magic debug value in programming.
- 3,461,824,644 : number of secondary structures of RNA molecules with 28 nucleotides
- 3,486,792,401 : Leyland number using 3 and 20 (3^{20} + 20^{3})
- 3,492,564,909 = 1^{2}+3^{4}+5^{6}+7^{8}+9^{10}
- 3,520,581,954 : number of series-reduced planted trees with 37 nodes
- 3,524,337,980 : number of 39-bead necklaces (turning over is allowed) where complements are equivalent
- 3,616,828,364 : number of 38-bead binary necklaces with beads of 2 colors where the colors may be swapped but turning over is not allowed
- 3,663,002,302 : number of prime numbers having eleven digits
- 3,697,909,056 : number of primitive polynomials of degree 37 over GF(2)
- 3,715,891,200 : double factorial of 20
- 3,735,928,559 = DEADBEEF_{16}; used as a magic debug value in programming.
- 3,735,929,054 = DEADC0DE_{16}; used as a magic debug value in programming.

=== 4,000,000,000 to 4,999,999,999 ===
- 4,118,054,813 : number of primes under 10^{11}
- 4,294,967,291 : Largest prime 32-bit unsigned integer.
- 4,294,967,295 : Maximum 32-bit unsigned integer (FFFFFFFF_{16}), perfect totient number, product of all known Fermat primes $F_0$ through $F_4$.
- 4,294,967,296 = 65536^{2} = 256^{4} = 16^{8} = 4^{16} = 2^{32}
- 4,294,967,297 : $F_5$, the first composite Fermat number.
- 4,294,968,320 : Leyland number using 2 and 32 (2^{32} + 32^{2})
- 4,295,032,832 : Leyland number using 4 and 16 (4^{16} + 16^{4})
- 4,467,033,943 : number of parallelogram polyominoes with 28 cells.
- 4,486,784,401 : Leyland number using 9 and 10 (9^{10} + 10^{9})
- 4,807,526,976 : 48th Fibonacci number.
- 4,822,382,628 : number of primitive polynomials of degree 38 over GF(2)

=== 5,000,000,000 to 5,999,999,999 ===
- 5,345,531,935 : number of centered hydrocarbons with 31 carbon atoms
- 5,354,228,880 : Least common multiple of the integers from 1 to 24
- 5,391,411,025 : smallest odd abundant number not divisible by 3
- 5,469,566,585 : number of trees with 29 unlabeled nodes
- 5,702,046,382 : number of signed trees with 18 nodes
- 5,784,634,181 : 13th alternating factorial.

=== 6,000,000,000 to 6,999,999,999 ===
- 6,104,053,449 : Leyland number using 5 and 14 (5^{14} + 14^{5})
- 6,210,001,000 : only self-descriptive number in base 10.
- 6,227,020,800 = 13!
- 6,469,693,230 : tenth primorial
- 6,564,120,420 : The 20th Catalan number.
- 6,659,914,175 : number of unordered unlabeled rooted trimmed trees with 30 nodes
- 6,872,485,104 : number of 40-bead necklaces (turning over is allowed) where complements are equivalent
- 6,983,776,800 : 15th colossally abundant number, 15th superior highly composite number, and the largest number to be both.

=== 7,000,000,000 to 7,999,999,999 ===
- 7,048,151,672 : number of 39-bead binary necklaces with beads of 2 colors where the colors may be swapped but turning over is not allowed
- 7,371,308,068 : number of partitions of 252 into divisors of 252
- 7,391,026,522 : number of planar partitions of 49
- 7,395,528,814 : number of series-reduced planted trees with 38 nodes
- 7,544,428,973 : number of uniform rooted trees with 28 nodes
- 7,645,370,045 : 27th Pell number.
- 7,778,742,049 : 49th Fibonacci number.
- 7,862,958,391 : 32nd Wedderburn–Etherington number.

=== 8,000,000,000 to 8,999,999,999 ===
- 8,212,890,625 : 1-automorphic number
- 8,549,176,320 : pandigital number with the digits arranged in alphabetical order by English name
- 8,589,866,963 : number of subsets of {1,2,...,33} with relatively prime elements
- 8,589,869,056 : 6th perfect number.
- 8,589,934,592 = 2048^{3} = 8^{11} = 2^{33}
- 8,589,935,681 : Leyland prime using 2 and 33 (2^{33} + 33^{2})
- 8,622,571,758 : number of secondary structures of RNA molecules with 29 nucleotides
- 8,804,293,473 : Leyland number using 8 and 11 (8^{11} + 11^{8})

=== 9,000,000,000 to 9,999,999,999 ===
- 9,043,402,501 : 25th Motzkin number.
- 9,814,072,356 = 99066^{2}, the largest pandigital square, largest pandigital pure power.
- 9,876,543,210 : largest pandigital number.
- 9,999,800,001 = 99999^{2}, the largest ten-digit square.
- 9,999,999,967 : greatest prime number with 10 digits
