= Highly abundant number =

Natural number whose divisor sum is greater than that of any smaller number

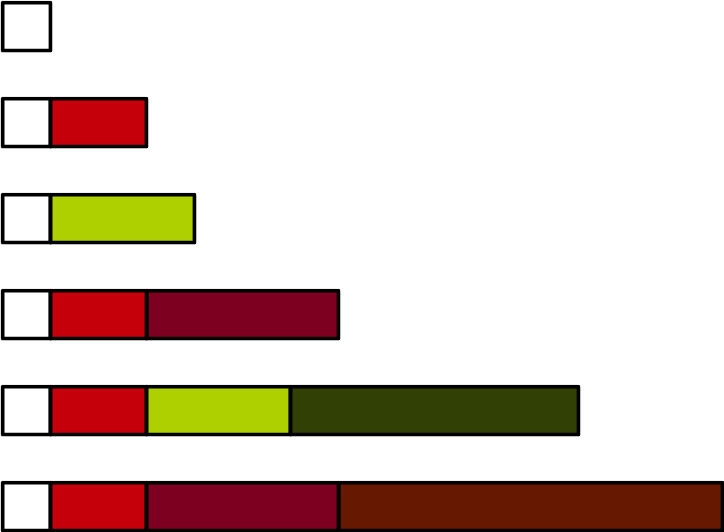
Sums of the divisors, in Cuisenaire rods, of the first six highly abundant numbers (1, 2, 3, 4, 6, 8)

In number theory, a highly abundant number is a natural number with the property that the sum of its divisors (including itself) is greater than the sum of the divisors of any smaller natural number.

Highly abundant numbers and several similar classes of numbers were first introduced by Pillai (1943), and early work on the subject was done by Alaoglu and Erdős (1944). Alaoglu and Erdős tabulated all highly abundant numbers up to 10^{4}, and showed that the number of highly abundant numbers less than any N is at least proportional to log^{2} N.

== Formal definition and examples ==
Formally, a natural number n is called highly abundant if and only if for all natural numbers m < n,

$$\sigma(n) > \sigma(m)$$

where σ denotes the sum-of-divisors function. The first few highly abundant numbers are

1, 2, 3, 4, 6, 8, 10, 12, 16, 18, 20, 24, 30, 36, 42, 48, 60, ... (sequence A002093 in the OEIS).

For instance, 5 is not highly abundant because σ(5) = 5+1 = 6 is smaller than σ(4) = 4 + 2 + 1 = 7, while 8 is highly abundant because σ(8) = 8 + 4 + 2 + 1 = 15 is larger than all previous values of σ.

The only odd highly abundant numbers are 1 and 3.

== Relations with other sets of numbers ==
Euler diagram of numbers under 100: Abundant Primitive abundant Highly abundant Superabundant and highly composite Colossally abundant and superior highly composite Weird Perfect Composite Deficient

Although the first eight factorials are highly abundant, not all factorials are highly abundant. For example,

σ(9!) = σ(362880) = 1481040,

but there is a smaller number with larger sum of divisors,

σ(360360) = 1572480,

so 9! is not highly abundant.

Alaoglu and Erdős noted that all superabundant numbers are highly abundant, and asked whether there are infinitely many highly abundant numbers that are not superabundant. This question was answered affirmatively by Jean-Louis Nicolas (1969).

Despite the terminology, not all highly abundant numbers are abundant numbers. In particular, none of the first seven highly abundant numbers (1, 2, 3, 4, 6, 8, and 10) is abundant. Along with 16, the ninth highly abundant number, these are the only highly abundant numbers that are not abundant.

7200 is the largest powerful number that is also highly abundant: all larger highly abundant numbers have a prime factor that divides them only once. Therefore, 7200 is also the largest highly abundant number with an odd sum of divisors.
