= Friendly number =

Two or more natural numbers with a common abundancy index

In number theory, friendly numbers are two or more natural numbers with a common abundancy index, the ratio between the sum of divisors of a number and the number itself. Two numbers with the same "abundancy" form a friendly pair; n numbers with the same abundancy form a friendly n-tuple.

Being mutually friendly is an equivalence relation, and thus induces a partition of the positive naturals into clubs (equivalence classes) of mutually friendly numbers.

A number that is not part of any friendly pair is called solitary.

The abundancy index of n is the rational number σ(n) / n, in which σ denotes the sum of divisors function. A number n is a friendly number if there exists m ≠ n such that σ(m) / m = σ(n) / n. Abundancy is not the same as abundance, which is defined as σ(n) − 2n.

Abundancy may also be expressed as $\sigma_{-1}(n)$ where $\sigma_k$ denotes a divisor function with $\sigma_{k}(n)$ equal to the sum of the k-th powers of the divisors of n.

The numbers 1 through 5 are all solitary. The smallest friendly number is 6, forming for example, the friendly pair 6 and 28 with abundancy σ(6) / 6 = (1+2+3+6) / 6 = 2, the same as σ(28) / 28 = (1+2+4+7+14+28) / 28 = 2. The shared value 2 is an integer in this case but not in many other cases. Numbers with abundancy 2 are also known as perfect numbers. There are several unsolved problems related to the friendly numbers.

In spite of the similarity in name, there is no specific relationship between the friendly numbers and the amicable numbers or the sociable numbers, although the definitions of the latter two also involve the divisor function.

== Examples ==
As another example, 30 and 140 form a friendly pair, because 30 and 140 have the same abundancy:

$$\dfrac{\sigma(30)}{30} = \dfrac{1+2+3+5+6+10+15+30}{30} =\dfrac{72}{30} = \dfrac{12}{5}$$
$$\dfrac{\sigma(140)}{140} = \dfrac{1+2+4+5+7+10+14+20+28+35+70+140}{140} = \dfrac{336}{140} = \dfrac{12}{5}.$$

The numbers 2480, 6200 and 40640 are also members of this club, as they each have an abundancy equal to 12/5.

For an example of odd numbers being friendly, consider 135 and 819 (abundancy 16/9 (deficient)). There are also cases of even numbers being friendly to odd numbers, such as 42, 3472, 56896, ... (sequence A347169 in the OEIS) and 544635 (abundancy of 16/7). The odd friend may be less than the even one, as in 84729645 and 155315394 (abundancy of 896/351), or in 6517665, 14705145 and 2746713837618 (abundancy of 64/27).

A square number can be friendly, for instance both 693479556 (the square of 26334) and 8640 have abundancy 127/36 (this example is credited to Dean Hickerson).

=== Status for small n ===
In the table below, blue numbers are proven friendly (sequence A074902 in the OEIS), red numbers are proven solitary (sequence A095739 in the OEIS), numbers n such that n and $\sigma(n)$ are coprime (sequence A014567 in the OEIS) are left uncolored, though they are known to be solitary. Other numbers (e.g. 10, 14, 15, 20) have unknown status and are yellow.

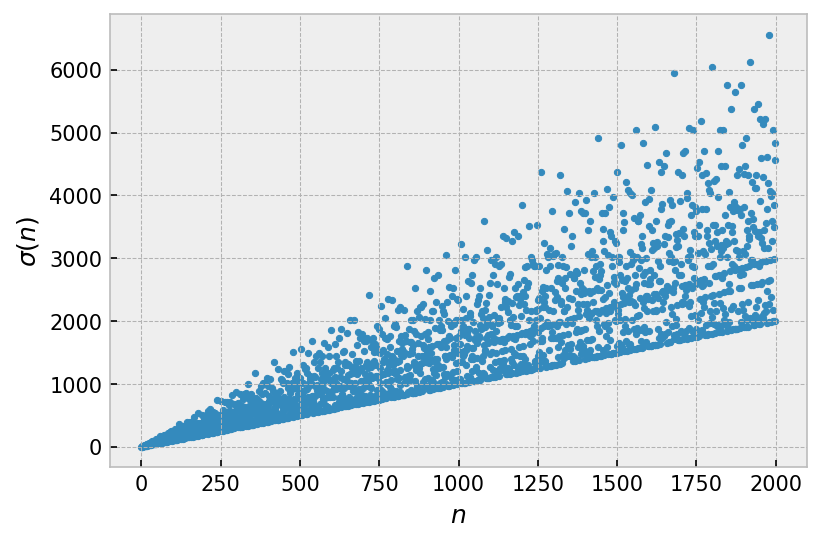
The sum of an integer's unique factors, up to n=2000.

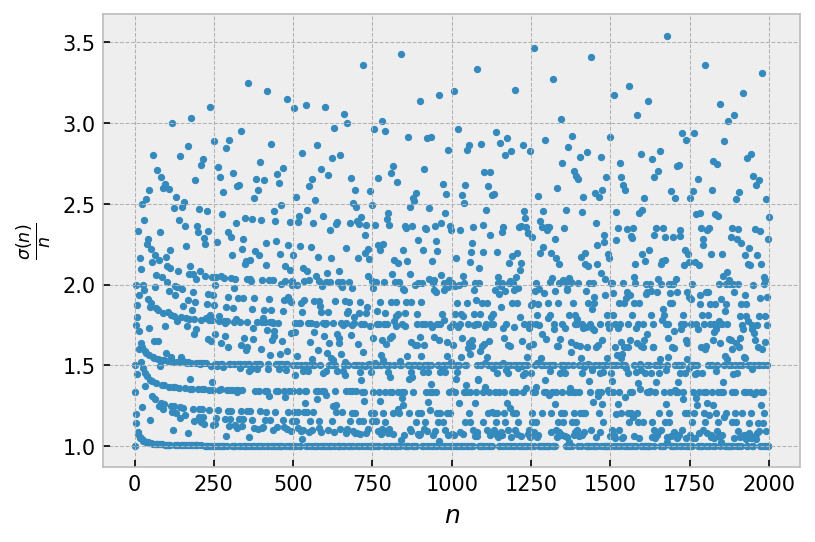
The friendly number index of integers up to 2000, computed by calculating the sum of its unique factors and dividing by n. In addition to apparent noise, distinct lines begin to appear.

$n$	$\sigma(n)$	$\frac{\sigma(n)}{n}$
1	1	1
2	3	3/2
3	4	4/3
4	7	7/4
5	6	6/5
6	12	2
7	8	8/7
8	15	15/8
9	13	13/9
10	18	9/5
11	12	12/11
12	28	7/3
13	14	14/13
14	24	12/7
15	24	8/5
16	31	31/16
17	18	18/17
18	39	13/6
19	20	20/19
20	42	21/10
21	32	32/21
22	36	18/11
23	24	24/23
24	60	5/2
25	31	31/25
26	42	21/13
27	40	40/27
28	56	2
29	30	30/29
30	72	12/5
31	32	32/31
32	63	63/32
33	48	16/11
34	54	27/17
35	48	48/35
36	91	91/36

$n$	$\sigma(n)$	$\frac{\sigma(n)}{n}$
37	38	38/37
38	60	30/19
39	56	56/39
40	90	9/4
41	42	42/41
42	96	16/7
43	44	44/43
44	84	21/11
45	78	26/15
46	72	36/23
47	48	48/47
48	124	31/12
49	57	57/49
50	93	93/50
51	72	24/17
52	98	49/26
53	54	54/53
54	120	20/9
55	72	72/55
56	120	15/7
57	80	80/57
58	90	45/29
59	60	60/59
60	168	14/5
61	62	62/61
62	96	48/31
63	104	104/63
64	127	127/64
65	84	84/65
66	144	24/11
67	68	68/67
68	126	63/34
69	96	32/23
70	144	72/35
71	72	72/71
72	195	65/24

$n$	$\sigma(n)$	$\frac{\sigma(n)}{n}$
73	74	74/73
74	114	57/37
75	124	124/75
76	140	35/19
77	96	96/77
78	168	28/13
79	80	80/79
80	186	93/40
81	121	121/81
82	126	63/41
83	84	84/83
84	224	8/3
85	108	108/85
86	132	66/43
87	120	40/29
88	180	45/22
89	90	90/89
90	234	13/5
91	112	16/13
92	168	42/23
93	128	128/93
94	144	72/47
95	120	24/19
96	252	21/8
97	98	98/97
98	171	171/98
99	156	52/33
100	217	217/100
101	102	102/101
102	216	36/17
103	104	104/103
104	210	105/52
105	192	64/35
106	162	81/53
107	108	108/107
108	280	70/27

$n$	$\sigma(n)$	$\frac{\sigma(n)}{n}$
109	110	110/109
110	216	108/55
111	152	152/111
112	248	31/14
113	114	114/113
114	240	40/19
115	144	144/115
116	210	105/58
117	182	14/9
118	180	90/59
119	144	144/119
120	360	3
121	133	133/121
122	186	93/61
123	168	56/41
124	224	56/31
125	156	156/125
126	312	52/21
127	128	128/127
128	255	255/128
129	176	176/129
130	252	126/65
131	132	132/131
132	336	28/11
133	160	160/133
134	204	102/67
135	240	16/9
136	270	135/68
137	138	138/137
138	288	48/23
139	140	140/139
140	336	12/5
141	192	64/47
142	216	108/71
143	168	168/143
144	403	403/144

== Solitary numbers ==
A number that belongs to a singleton club, because no other number is friendly with it, is a solitary number. All prime numbers are known to be solitary, as are powers of prime numbers. More generally, if the numbers n and σ(n) are coprime – meaning that the greatest common divisor of these numbers is 1, so that σ(n)/n is an irreducible fraction – then the number n is solitary (sequence A014567 in the OEIS). For a prime number p we have σ(p) = p + 1, which is co-prime with p.

No general method is known for determining whether a number is friendly or solitary.

== Is 10 a solitary number? ==
The smallest number whose classification is unknown is 10; it is conjectured to be solitary. If it is not, its smallest friend is at least $10^{30}$. J. Ward proved that any positive integer $n$ other than 10 with abundancy index $\frac{9}{5}$ must be a square with at least six distinct prime factors, the smallest being 5. Further, at least one of the prime factors must be congruent to 1 modulo 3 and appear with an exponent congruent to 2 modulo 6 in the prime power factorization of $n$. HR (Maya) Thackeray applied methods from Nielsen's to show that each friend of 10 has at least 10 nonidentical prime factors. S. Mandal and S. Mandal proved that if $n$ is a friend of 10 and if $q_2,q_3, q_4$ are the second, third, fourth smallest prime divisors of $n$ respectively then

$7\leq q_2<\left \lceil \frac{7\omega( n )}{3} \right \rceil\biggl(\log\left \lceil \frac{7\omega( n )}{3} \right \rceil+2\log \log \left \lceil \frac{7\omega(n)}{ 3 } \right \rceil\biggr),$

$11\leq q_3<\left \lceil \frac{180\omega( n )}{41} \right \rceil\biggl(\log\left \lceil \frac{180\omega( n )}{41} \right \rceil+2\log \log \left \lceil \frac{180\omega(n)}{ 41 } \right \rceil\biggr),$

$13\leq q_4<\left \lceil \frac{390\omega( n )}{47} \right \rceil\biggl(\log\left \lceil \frac{390\omega( n )}{47} \right \rceil+2\log \log \left \lceil \frac{390\omega(n)}{47} \right \rceil\biggr) ,$

where $\omega(n)$ is the number of distinct prime divisors of $n$ and $\left \lceil \right \rceil$ is the ceiling function. Later, S. Mandal proved that for smallest $r$-th ($r\geq2$) prime divisor $q_r$, the following bound holds

$q_r<\left \lceil \frac{\mathcal{A}\omega( n )}{\mathcal{B}} \right \rceil\biggl(\log\left \lceil \frac{\mathcal{A}\omega( n )}{\mathcal{B}} \right \rceil+2\log \log \left \lceil \frac{\mathcal{A}\omega( n )}{\mathcal{B}} \right \rceil\biggr),$

where $\frac{\mathcal{A}}{\mathcal{B}}>\frac{1}{\dfrac{36}{25}\prod_{i=4}^{r+1}(1-1/p_i)-1},$ (where $p_i$is the $i$-th prime number), $\mathcal{A},\mathcal{B}$ are positive integers with $(\mathcal{A},\mathcal{B})=1$ and $\frac{\mathcal{A}}{\mathcal{B}}\in \mathbb{Q}^+\setminus \mathbb{Z}^+$ such that $\mathcal{A}\mathcal{B}(r-2)+2\mathcal{A}+\mathcal{B}>\mathcal{B}^2$. Further, S. Mandal proved that not all half of the exponents of the prime divisors of a friend of 10 are congruent to 1 modulo 3. Further, he proved that if $n= 5^{2a}\cdot Q^2$ ($Q$ is an odd positive integer coprime to 15 ) is a friend of 10, then $\sigma(5^{2a})+\sigma(Q^{2})$ is congruent to 6 modulo 8 if and only if $a$ is even, and $\sigma(5^{2a})+\sigma(Q^{2})$ is congruent to 2 modulo 8 if and only if $a$ is odd. In addition, he established that $n> \frac{25}{81}\cdot \prod_{i=1}^{\omega(n)} (2a_i+1)^2$, in particular $n>625\cdot 9^{\omega(n)-3}$ by setting $Q=\prod_{i=2}^{\omega(n)} p_i^{a_i}$ and $a=a_1$, where $p_i$ are prime numbers.

Small numbers with a relatively large smallest friend do exist: for instance, 24 is friendly, with its smallest friend 91,963,648.

== Large clubs ==
It is an open problem whether there are infinitely large clubs of mutually friendly numbers. The perfect numbers form a club, and it is conjectured that there are infinitely many perfect numbers (at least as many as there are Mersenne primes), but no proof is known. There are clubs with more known members: in particular, those formed by multiply perfect numbers, which are numbers whose abundancy is an integer. Although some are known to be quite large, clubs of multiply perfect numbers (excluding the perfect numbers themselves) are conjectured to be finite.

== Asymptotic density ==
Every pair a, b of friendly numbers gives rise to a positive proportion of all natural numbers being friendly (but in different clubs), by considering pairs na, nb for multipliers n with gcd(n, ab) = 1. For example, the "primitive" friendly pair 6 and 28 gives rise to friendly pairs 6n and 28n for all n that are congruent to 1, 5, 11, 13, 17, 19, 23, 25, 29, 31, 37, or 41 modulo 42.

This shows that the natural density of the friendly numbers (if it exists) is positive.

Anderson and Hickerson proposed that the density should in fact be 1 (or equivalently that the density of the solitary numbers should be 0). According to the MathWorld article on Solitary Number (see References section below), this conjecture has not been resolved, although Pomerance thought at one point he had disproved it.
