= Colossally abundant number =

Type of natural number

Sigma function σ_{1}(n) up to n = 250

Prime-power factors

In number theory, a colossally abundant number (sometimes abbreviated as CA) is a natural number that, in a particular, rigorous sense, has many divisors. Particularly, it is defined by a ratio between the sum of an integer's divisors and that integer raised to a power higher than one. For any such exponent, whichever integer has the highest ratio is a colossally abundant number. It is a stronger restriction than that of a superabundant number, but not strictly stronger than that of an abundant number.

Formally, a number n is said to be colossally abundant if there is an ε > 0 such that for all k > 1,

$$\frac{\sigma(n)}{n^{1+\varepsilon}}\geq\frac{\sigma(k)}{k^{1+\varepsilon}}$$

where σ denotes the sum-of-divisors function. That is, $n$ attains the maximum value of $\frac{\sigma(k)}{k^{1+\varepsilon}}$.

The first 15 colossally abundant numbers, 2, 6, 12, 60, 120, 360, 2520, 5040, 55440, 720720, 1441440, 4324320, 21621600, 367567200, 6983776800 (sequence A004490 in the OEIS) are also the first 15 superior highly composite numbers, but neither set is a subset of the other.

== History ==
Euler diagram of numbers under 100: Abundant Primitive abundant Highly abundant Superabundant and highly composite Colossally abundant and superior highly composite Weird Perfect Composite Deficient

Colossally abundant numbers were first studied by Ramanujan and his findings were intended to be included in his 1915 paper on highly composite numbers. Unfortunately, the publisher of the journal to which Ramanujan submitted his work, the London Mathematical Society, was in financial difficulties at the time and Ramanujan agreed to remove aspects of the work to reduce the cost of printing. His findings were mostly conditional on the Riemann hypothesis and with this assumption he found upper and lower bounds for the size of colossally abundant numbers and proved that what would come to be known as Robin's inequality (see below) holds for all sufficiently large values of n.

The class of numbers was reconsidered in a slightly stronger form in a 1944 paper of Leonidas Alaoglu and Paul Erdős in which they tried to extend Ramanujan's results.

== Properties ==
Colossally abundant numbers are one of several classes of integers that try to capture the notion of having many divisors. For a positive integer n, the sum-of-divisors function σ(n) gives the sum of all those numbers that divide n, including 1 and n itself. Paul Bachmann showed that on average, σ(n) is around π^{2}n / 6. Grönwall's theorem, meanwhile, says that the maximal order of σ(n) is ever so slightly larger, specifically there is an increasing sequence of integers n such that for these integers σ(n) is roughly the same size as e^{γ}n(log(log(n))), where γ is the Euler–Mascheroni constant. Hence colossally abundant numbers capture the notion of having many divisors by requiring them to maximise, for some ε > 0, the value of the function

$$\frac{\sigma(n)}{n^{1+\varepsilon}}$$

over all values of n. Bachmann and Grönwall's results ensure that for every ε > 0 this function has a maximum and that as ε tends to zero these maxima will increase. Thus there are infinitely many colossally abundant numbers, although they are rather sparse, with only 22 of them less than 10^{18}.

Just like with superior highly composite numbers, an effective construction of the set of all colossally abundant numbers is given by the following monotonic mapping from the positive real numbers. Let

$$e_p(\varepsilon) = \left\lfloor\frac{\ln\left(1+\displaystyle\frac{p-1}{p^{1+\varepsilon}-p}\right)}{\ln p}\right\rfloor\quad$$

for any prime number p and positive real $\varepsilon$. Then

$\quad s(\varepsilon) = \prod_{p \in \mathbb{P}} p^{e_p(\varepsilon)}\$ is a colossally abundant number.

For every ε the above function has a maximum, but it is not obvious, and in fact not true, that for every ε this maximum value is unique. Alaoglu and Erdős studied how many different values of n could give the same maximal value of the above function for a given value of ε. They showed that for most values of ε there would be a single integer n maximising the function. Later, however, Erdős and Jean-Louis Nicolas showed that for a certain set of discrete values of ε there could be two or four different values of n giving the same maximal value.

In their 1944 paper, Alaoglu and Erdős conjectured that the ratio of two consecutive colossally abundant numbers was always a prime number. They showed that this would follow from a special case of the four exponentials conjecture in transcendental number theory, specifically that for any two distinct prime numbers p and q, the only real numbers t for which both p^{t} and q^{t} are rational are the positive integers. Using the corresponding result for three primes, which Siegel assured them was true—a special case of the six exponentials theorem proven in the 1960s by Serge Lang and K. Ramachandra —they managed to show that the quotient of two consecutive colossally abundant numbers is always either a prime or a semiprime (that is, a number with just two prime factors). The quotient can never be the square of a prime.

Alaoglu and Erdős's conjecture remains open, although it has been checked up to at least 10^{7}. If true it would mean that there was a sequence of non-distinct prime numbers p_{1}, p_{2}, p_{3},... such that the nth colossally abundant number was of the form

$$c_n = \prod_{i=1}^n p_{i}$$

Assuming the conjecture holds, this sequence of primes begins 2, 3, 2, 5, 2, 3, 7, 2 (sequence A073751 in the OEIS). Alaoglu and Erdős's conjecture would also mean that no value of ε gives four different integers n as maxima of the above function.

=== Relation to abundant numbers ===
Like superabundant numbers, colossally abundant numbers are a generalization of abundant numbers. Also like superabundant numbers, it is not a strict generalization; a number can be colossally abundant without being abundant. This is true in the case of 6; 6's divisors are 1,2,3, and 6, but an abundant number is defined to be one where the sum of the divisors, excluding itself, is greater than the number itself; 1+2+3=6, so this condition is not met (and 6 is instead a perfect number). However all colossally abundant numbers are also superabundant numbers.

== Relation to the Riemann hypothesis ==
In the 1980s Guy Robin showed that the Riemann hypothesis is equivalent to the assertion that the following inequality is true for all n > 5040: (where γ is the Euler–Mascheroni constant)

$$\sigma(n)<e^\gamma n \log\log n \approx 1.781072418 n \log\log n \,$$

This inequality is known to fail for 27 numbers (sequence A067698 in the OEIS):

2, 3, 4, 5, 6, 8, 9, 10, 12, 16, 18, 20, 24, 30, 36, 48, 60, 72, 84, 120, 180, 240, 360, 720, 840, 2520, 5040

Robin showed that if the Riemann hypothesis is true then n = 5040 is the last integer for which it fails. The inequality is now known as Robin's inequality after his work. It is known that Robin's inequality, if it ever fails to hold, will fail for a colossally abundant number n; thus the Riemann hypothesis is in fact equivalent to Robin's inequality holding for every colossally abundant number n > 5040.

In 2001–2 Lagarias demonstrated an alternate form of Robin's assertion which requires no exceptions, using the harmonic numbers instead of log:

$$\sigma(n) < H_n + \exp(H_n)\log(H_n)$$

Or, other than the 8 exceptions of n = 1, 2, 3, 4, 6, 12, 24, 60:

$$\sigma(n) < \exp(H_n)\log(H_n)$$
