= Granville number =

In mathematics, specifically number theory, Granville numbers, also known as $\mathcal{S}$-perfect numbers, are an extension of the perfect numbers.

== The Granville set ==
In 1996, Andrew Granville proposed the following construction of a set $\mathcal{S}$:

Let $1\in\mathcal{S}$, and for any integer $n$ larger than 1, let $n\in{\mathcal{S}}$ if

$$\sum_{d\mid n, \; d<n,\; d\in\mathcal{S}} d \leq n.$$

A Granville number is an element of $\mathcal{S}$ for which equality holds, that is, $n$ is a Granville number if it is equal to the sum of its proper divisors that are also in $\mathcal{S}$. Granville numbers are also called $\mathcal{S}$-perfect numbers.

== General properties ==
The elements of $\mathcal{S}$ can be k-deficient, k-perfect, or k-abundant. In particular, 2-perfect numbers are a proper subset of $\mathcal{S}$.

=== S-deficient numbers ===
Numbers that fulfill the strict form of the inequality in the above definition are known as $\mathcal{S}$-deficient numbers. That is, the $\mathcal{S}$-deficient numbers are the natural numbers for which the sum of their divisors in $\mathcal{S}$ is strictly less than themselves:

$$\sum_{d\mid{n},\; d<n,\; d\in\mathcal{S}}d < {n}$$

=== S-perfect numbers ===
Numbers that fulfill equality in the above definition are known as $\mathcal{S}$-perfect numbers. That is, the $\mathcal{S}$-perfect numbers are the natural numbers that are equal the sum of their divisors in $\mathcal{S}$. The first few $\mathcal{S}$-perfect numbers are:

6, 24, 28, 96, 126, 224, 384, 496, 1536, 1792, 6144, 8128, 14336, ... (sequence A118372 in the OEIS)

Every perfect number is also $\mathcal{S}$-perfect. However, there are numbers such as 24 which are $\mathcal{S}$-perfect but not perfect. The only known $\mathcal{S}$-perfect number with three distinct prime factors is 126 = 2 · 3^{2} · 7.

=== S-abundant numbers ===
Numbers that violate the inequality in the above definition are known as $\mathcal{S}$-abundant numbers. That is, the $\mathcal{S}$-abundant numbers are the natural numbers for which the sum of their divisors in $\mathcal{S}$ is strictly greater than themselves:

$$\sum_{d\mid{n},\; d<n,\; d\in\mathcal{S}}d > {n}$$

They belong to the complement of $\mathcal{S}$. The first few $\mathcal{S}$-abundant numbers are:

12, 18, 20, 30, 42, 48, 56, 66, 70, 72, 78, 80, 84, 88, 90, 102, 104, ... (sequence A181487 in the OEIS)

== Examples ==
Every deficient number and every perfect number is in $\mathcal{S}$ because the restriction of the divisors sum to members of $\mathcal{S}$ either decreases the divisors sum or leaves it unchanged. The first natural number that is not in $\mathcal{S}$ is the smallest abundant number, which is 12. The next two abundant numbers, 18 and 20, are also not in $\mathcal{S}$. However, the fourth abundant number, 24, is in $\mathcal{S}$ because the sum of its proper divisors in $\mathcal{S}$ is:

1 + 2 + 3 + 4 + 6 + 8 = 24

In other words, 24 is abundant but not $\mathcal{S}$-abundant because 12 is not in $\mathcal{S}$. In fact, 24 is $\mathcal{S}$-perfect - it is the smallest number that is $\mathcal{S}$-perfect but not perfect.

The smallest odd abundant number that is in $\mathcal{S}$ is 2835, and the smallest pair of consecutive numbers that are not in $\mathcal{S}$ are 5984 and 5985.
