= Betrothed numbers =

Type of positive integer pairs

In mathematics, specifically number theory, betrothed numbers or quasi-amicable numbers are two positive integers such that the sum of the proper divisors of either number is one more than the value of the other number. In other words, (m, n) are a pair of betrothed numbers if s(m) = n + 1 and s(n) = m + 1, where s(n) is the aliquot sum of n: an equivalent condition is that σ(m) = σ(n) = m + n + 1, where σ denotes the sum-of-divisors function.

The first few pairs of betrothed numbers are: (48, 75), (140, 195), (1050, 1925), (1575, 1648), (2024, 2295), (5775, 6128), which (removing brackets) may be sorted by magnitude (sequence A005276 in the OEIS).

All known pairs of betrothed numbers have opposite parity. Any pair of the same parity must exceed 10^{13}.

== Quasi-sociable numbers ==
Quasi-sociable numbers or reduced sociable numbers are numbers whose aliquot sums minus one form a cyclic sequence that begins and ends with the same number. They are generalizations of the concepts of betrothed numbers and quasiperfect numbers. The first quasi-sociable sequences, or quasi-sociable chains, were discovered by Mitchell Dickerman in 1997:

- $1215571544 = 2^3\cdot 11\cdot 13813313$
- $1270824975 = 3^2\cdot 5^2\cdot 7\cdot 19\cdot 42467$
- $1467511664 = 2^4\cdot 19\cdot 599\cdot 8059$
- $1530808335 = 3^3\cdot 5\cdot 7\cdot 1619903$
- $1579407344 = 2^4\cdot 31^2\cdot 59\cdot 1741$
- $1638031815 = 3^4\cdot 5\cdot 7\cdot 521\cdot 1109$
- $1727239544 = 2^3\cdot 2671\cdot 80833$
- $1512587175 = 3\cdot 5^2\cdot 11\cdot 1833439$
