= Descartes number =

Integer sequence in number theory

In number theory, a Descartes number is an odd number which would have been an odd perfect number if one of its composite factors were prime. They are named after René Descartes, who observed that the number D = 3^{2} ⋅ 7^{2} ⋅ 11^{2} ⋅ 13^{2} ⋅ 22021 = (3⋅1001)^{2} ⋅ (22⋅1001 − 1) = 198585576189 would be an odd perfect number if only 22021 were a prime number, since in that case the sum-of-divisors function for D would satisfy
$$\begin{align}
\sigma(D)
&= (3^2+3+1)\cdot(7^2+7+1)\cdot(11^2+11+1)\cdot(13^2+13+1)\cdot(22021+1) \\
&= (13)\cdot(3\cdot19)\cdot(7\cdot19)\cdot(3\cdot61)\cdot(22\cdot1001) \\
&= 3^2\cdot7\cdot13\cdot19^2\cdot61\cdot(22\cdot7\cdot11\cdot13) \\ &= 2 \cdot (3^2\cdot7^2\cdot11^2\cdot13^2) \cdot (19^2\cdot61)  \\ &= 2 \cdot (3^2\cdot7^2\cdot11^2\cdot13^2) \cdot 22021 = 2D.
\end{align}$$
In reality, 22021 is composite (22021 = 19^{2} ⋅ 61), and $\sigma(D) = 426027470778 = \frac{23622}{11011} D$.

A Descartes number is defined as an odd number n = m ⋅ p where m and p are coprime and 2n = σ(m) ⋅ (p + 1), whence p is taken as a 'spoof' prime. The example given is the only one currently known.

If m is an odd almost perfect number, that is, σ(m) = 2m − 1 and 2m − 1 is taken as a 'spoof' prime, then n = m ⋅ (2m − 1) is a Descartes number, since σ(n) = σ(m ⋅ (2m − 1)) = σ(m) ⋅ 2m = (2m − 1) ⋅ 2m = 2n. If 2m − 1 were prime, n would be an odd perfect number.

== Properties ==
If n is a cube-free Descartes number not divisible by 3, then n has over one million distinct prime divisors. If $D=pq$ is a Descartes number other than Descartes' example, with spoof-prime factor $p$, then $q > 10^{12}$.

== Generalizations ==
John Voight generalized Descartes numbers to allow negative bases. He found the example $3^4 7^2 11^2 19^2 (-127)^1$. Subsequent work by a group at Brigham Young University found more examples similar to Voight's example, and also allowed a new class of spoofs where one is allowed to also not notice that a prime is the same as another prime in the factorization. A generalization of Descartes numbers to multiperfect numbers has also been constructed.

== See also ==
- Erdős–Nicolas number, another type of almost-perfect number
