= Erdős–Nicolas number =

In math, a number that is equal to the sum of some of its factors

- Named after: Paul Erdős, Jean-Louis Nicolas
- Publication year: 1975
- Author of publication: Erdős, P., Nicolas, J. L.
- Subsequence of: Abundant numbers
- First terms: 24, 2016, 8190
- Largest known term: 3304572752464376776401640967110656
- OEIS index: A194472; Erdős-Nicolas numbers

In number theory, an Erdős–Nicolas number is a number that is not perfect, but that equals one of the partial sums of its divisors. That is, a number n is an Erdős–Nicolas number when there exists another number m such that

$\sum_{d\mid n,\ d\leq m}d=n.$

The first ten Erdős–Nicolas numbers are

24, 2016, 8190, 42336, 45864, 392448, 714240, 1571328, 61900800 and 91963648. ((sequence A194472 in the OEIS))

They are named after Paul Erdős and Jean-Louis Nicolas, who wrote about them in 1975.

== See also ==
- Descartes number, another type of almost-perfect numbers
