= Composite number =

Integer having a non-trivial divisor

Composite numbers can be arranged into rectangles but prime numbers cannot.

Demonstration, with Cuisenaire rods, of the divisors of the composite number 10

A composite number is a positive integer that can be formed by multiplying two smaller positive integers. Accordingly, it is a positive integer that has at least one divisor other than 1 and itself. Every positive integer is composite, prime, or the unit 1, so the composite numbers are exactly the natural numbers that are not prime and not a unit. For example, the integer 14 is a composite number because it is the product of the two smaller integers 2 and 7; however, the integers 2 and 3 are not because each can only be divided by one and itself.

The first 25 composite numbers (all up to 36) are:

4, 6, 8, 9, 10, 12, 14, 15, 16, 18, 20, 21, 22, 24, 25, 26, 27, 28, 30, 32, 33, 34, 35, 36. (sequence A002808 in the OEIS)

Every composite number can be written as the product of two or more (not necessarily distinct) primes. For example, the composite number 299 can be written as 13 × 23, and the composite number 360 can be written as 2^{3} × 3^{2} × 5; furthermore, this representation is unique up to the order of the factors. This fact is called the fundamental theorem of arithmetic.

There are several known primality tests that can determine whether a number is prime or composite, which do not necessarily reveal the factorization of a composite input.

Grimm's conjecture states that, for every set of consecutive composite numbers, there is an equally sized set of prime numbers, and a bijection mapping each composite in the former set to a prime in the latter set that it is divisible by.

== Types ==
One way to classify composite numbers is by counting the number of prime factors. A composite number with two prime factors is a semiprime or 2-almost prime (the factors need not be distinct, hence squares of primes are included). A composite number with three distinct prime factors is a sphenic number. In some applications, it is necessary to differentiate composite numbers with an odd number of distinct prime factors and those with an even number of distinct prime factors. For the latter,
$$\mu(n) = (-1)^{2x} = 1$$

(where μ is the Möbius function and x is half the total of prime factors), while for the former,

$$\mu(n) = (-1)^{2x + 1} = -1.$$

However, for prime numbers, the function also returns −1 and $\mu(1) = 1$. For a number n with one or more repeated prime factors,

$\mu(n) = 0$.

If all the prime factors of a number are repeated it is called a powerful number (too, all perfect powers are powerful numbers). If none of its prime factors are repeated, it is called squarefree. (All prime numbers and 1 are squarefree.)

For example, 72 = 2^{3} × 3^{2}, all the prime factors are repeated, so 72 is a powerful number. 42 = 2 × 3 × 7, none of the prime factors are repeated, so 42 is squarefree.

Euler diagram of numbers under 100: Abundant Primitive abundant Highly abundant Superabundant and highly composite Colossally abundant and superior highly composite Weird Perfect Composite Deficient

Another way to classify composite numbers is by counting the number of divisors. All composite numbers have at least three divisors. In the case of squares of primes, those divisors are $\{1, p, p^2\}$. A number n that has more divisors than any x < n is a highly composite number (though the first two such numbers are 1 and 2).

Composite numbers have also been called "rectangular numbers", but that name can also refer to the pronic numbers, numbers that are the product of two consecutive integers.

Yet another way to classify composite numbers is to determine whether all prime factors are either all below or all above some fixed (prime) number. Such numbers are called smooth numbers and rough numbers, respectively.

== See also ==
- Canonical representation of a positive integer
- Integer factorization
- Sieve of Eratosthenes
- Table of prime factors
- Divisor function
- Prime omega function
- Möbius function
