= Almost perfect number =

Numbers whose sum of divisors is twice the number minus 1

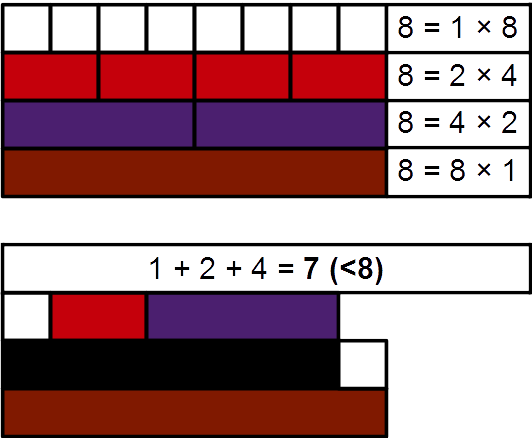
Demonstration, with Cuisenaire rods, that the number 8 is almost perfect, and deficient.

Unsolved problem in mathematics
Do any non-power of 2 almost perfect numbers exist?
More unsolved problems in mathematics

In mathematics, an almost perfect number (sometimes also called slightly defective or least deficient number) is a natural number n such that the sum of all divisors of n (the sum-of-divisors function σ(n)) is equal to 2n − 1, the sum of all proper divisors of n, s(n) = σ(n) − n, then being equal to n − 1. The only known almost perfect numbers are powers of 2 with non-negative exponents (sequence A000079 in the OEIS). Therefore the only known odd almost perfect number is 2^{0} = 1, and the only known even almost perfect numbers are those of the form 2^{k} for some positive integer k; however, it has not been shown that all almost perfect numbers are of this form. It is known that an odd almost perfect number greater than 1 would have at least six prime factors.

If m is an odd almost perfect number then m(2m − 1) is a Descartes number. Moreover if a and b are positive odd integers such that $b+3<a<\sqrt{m/2}$ and such that 4m − a and 4m + b are both primes, then m(4m − a)(4m + b) would be an odd weird number.

== See also ==
- Perfect number
- Quasiperfect number
