= Leonidas Alaoglu =

Canadian-American mathematician of Greek origin and operations researcher (1914–1981)

- Born: 1914; Red Deer, Alberta, Canada
- Died: 1981 (aged 66–67)
- Citizenship: Canadian-American
- Education: University of Chicago
- Known for: Alaoglu's theorem
- Scientific career
- Fields: Mathematics (topology, number theory)
- Workplaces: Pennsylvania State College; Harvard University; Purdue University; United States Air Force; Lockheed Martin
- Thesis: Weak topologies of normed linear spaces (1938)
- Doctoral advisor: Lawrence M. Graves

Leonidas (Leon) Alaoglu (Greek: Λεωνίδας Αλάογλου; 1914–1981) was a Canadian-American mathematician and operations researcher. During his six-year stint as a mathematician from 1938 to 1944, Alaoglu studied several topics, including topology, number theory, and the geometry of polyhedra. His best known result, which he proved during this period, was Alaoglu's theorem on the weak-star compactness of the closed unit ball in the dual of a normed space. After 1944, he left academia for the world of operations research.

== Life and work ==
=== Early life (1914–1938) ===
Alaoglu was born in 1914 in Red Deer, Alberta, Canada, to Greek Canadian parents. He studied mathematics at the University of Alberta.

=== Education and mathematical career (1938–1944) ===
In 1938, Alaoglu received his PhD from the University of Chicago. His dissertation was on Weak topologies of normed linear spaces and establishes Alaoglu's theorem. He went on to spend one year at Pennsylvania State University, then went on to Harvard University between 1939 and 1941 and to Purdue University between 1942 and 1944.

=== Operations research career (1944–1981) ===
In 1944, in the midst of World War II, Alaoglu left academia to become an operations analyst for the United States Air Force. In 1946, he gained U.S. citizenship.

On August 21, 1947, Alaoglu married teacher Cleo Alaoglu (1915–2016). The couple would go on to have three children, raising them in the Encino district of Los Angeles as well as in Washington, D.C.

In 1952, Anaoglu attended the founding meeting of the Operations Research Society of America. In 1953, he joined the Operations Research Division of the Lockheed Corporation as a mathematician, where he worked ever since, until he eventually died in 1981.

=== Legacy ===
Beginning in 1983, Caltech instituted the annual "Leonidas Alaoglu Memorial Lecture in Mathematics" in Alaoglu's honor.

== Research ==
=== Topology and analysis ===
In 1938, Alaoglu proved in his PhD thesis that, in the dual space of a Banach space under the weak-star topology, the closed unit ball is compact. His thesis was at the University of Chicago with Lawrence M. Graves.

In 1940, Alaoglu gave a general theory of weak convergence in a normed linear space in his PhD thesis using the notion of a directed set. In particular, he constructed a universal Banach space, and also described how to integrate and differentiate functions which take values in an adjoint space.

In 1940, Alaoglu and Garrett Birkhoff proved two ergodic theorems (i.e., statements that sums of the form $\sum_g \lambda_g xT_g$ for some group or semigroup G of linear operators $T_g$ on a Banach space E converge). The first one covers the case when $|xT_g|\leq |x|$ and E is uniformly convex. The second covers the case when the group is an "ergodic group", in the sense that there is an infinite series of measures on the group that is asymptotically invariant under both left-multiplication and right-multiplication. (This class includes n-parameter abelian groups and all Lie groups which correspond to a nilpotent Lie algebra.)

=== Number theory ===
In 1944, Alaoglu and Paul Erdős studied the prime factorizations of superabundant numbers and highly composite numbers. In particular, for a highly abundant number $n = \prod_i p^{k_p}$, they gave the estimate $\log(1 + 1/k_p) > \log q\log 2/\log p + O(\delta)$, where the error term behaves as $(\log\log p)^3/(\log p)^3$ for small q and $1/q^{1 - \theta}\log p$ for larger q. In doing so, they made use of Albert Ingham and Guido Hoheisel's result that the density of the prime numbers is the same in intervals $(q, q + cq^{\theta})$ for some $\theta < 1$. The same year, Alaoglu and Erdős discussed a 1932 conjecture of Paul Poulet that iterating the function $\phi(\sigma(n))$ where $\phi$ is the totient function and $\sigma$ is the sum-of-divisors function eventually leads to a cycle. Using tables originally provided by James Whitbread Lee Glaisher, they verified the conjecture up to $n < 10,000$.

=== Geometry ===
In 1946, Alaoglu and John H. Giese constructed uniform, isohedral polyhedra that were topologically equivalent to a torus.

== See also ==
- Axiom of Choice – The Banach–Alaoglu theorem is not provable from ZF without use of the Axiom of Choice.
- Banach–Alaoglu theorem
- Gelfand representation
- List of functional analysis topics
- Superabundant number – Article explains the 1944 results of Alaoglu and Erdős on this topic
- Tychonoff's theorem
- Weak topology – Leads to the weak-star topology to which the Banach–Alaoglu theorem applies.
