= Quasiperfect number =

Numbers whose sum of divisors is twice the number plus 1

Unsolved problem in mathematics
Do quasiperfect numbers exist?
More unsolved problems in mathematics

In mathematics, a quasiperfect number is a natural number n for which the sum of all its divisors (the sum-of-divisors function $\sigma(n)$) is equal to $2n + 1$. Equivalently, n is the sum of its non-trivial divisors (that is, its divisors excluding 1 and n). No quasiperfect numbers have been found so far.

The quasiperfect numbers are the abundant numbers of minimal abundance (which is 1).

== Theorems ==
If a quasiperfect number exists, it must be an odd square number greater than 10^{35} and have at least seven distinct prime factors.

== Related ==
For a perfect number n the sum of all its divisors is equal to $2n$. For an almost perfect number n the sum of all its divisors is equal to $2n - 1$.

Numbers n whose sum of factors equals $2n + 2$ are known to exist. They are of form $2^{n - 1} \times (2^n - 3)$ where $2^n - 3$ is a prime. The only exception known so far is $650 = 2 \times 5^2 \times 13$. They are 20, 104, 464, 650, 1952, 130304, 522752, ... (sequence A088831 in the OEIS). Numbers n whose sum of factors equals $2n - 2$ are also known to exist. They are of form $2^{n - 1} \times (2^n + 1)$ where $2^n + 1$ is prime. No exceptions are found so far. Because of the five known Fermat primes, there are five such numbers known: 3, 10, 136, 32896 and 2147516416 (sequence A191363 in the OEIS)

Betrothed numbers relate to quasiperfect numbers like amicable numbers relate to perfect numbers.
