= William of Auberive =

William of Auberive (French: Guillaume d'Auberive) was a Cistercian monk and numerologist who served as the abbot of Auberive from 1165 until 1186.

Two of William's treatises—De sacramentis numerorum a ternario usque ad duodenarium and Regule arithmetice—and three of his letters have been published. He belonged to a group of Cistercians whose work was an expansion on the work of Hugh of Saint-Victor allegorizing numbers in the Bible. His De sacramentis on the numbers three (3) through twelve (12) is a direct continuation of the Analytica numerorum of Odo of Morimond on the first three natural numbers. It was itself followed by the work of Geoffrey of Auxerre, beginning with thirteen (13). He was an influence on Theobald of Langres.

William probably wrote around 1164, before he became abbot. He knew the De arithmetica of Boethius and was especially interested in perfect numbers. He invented some terms of his own. If the aliquot sum of a number was greater than the number, the difference between them he called fructus (fruit). If two numbers had identical aliquot sums, the sum was said be the "number of love".

== Editions ==
- Leclercq, Jean. "L'arithmétique de Guillaume d'Auberive". Analecta Monastica, 1st ser. Studia Anselmiana, 20. Vatican City, 1948. pp. 181–204. De sacramentis and the letter De sacramento quadragenarii are at pp. 197–202.
- Lange, Hanne. "Les données mathématiques des traités du XII^{e} siècle sur la symbolique des nombres". Cahiers de l'Institut du Moyen-Âge Grec et Latin, 32 (1979):1–128. Regule arithmetice and two other letters are at pp. 86–117.
