= Grimm's conjecture =

Prime number conjecture

In mathematics, specifically in number theory, Grimm's conjecture states that, for every set of consecutive composite numbers, there is an equally sized set of prime numbers, and a bijection that maps each composite in the former set to a prime in the latter set that it is divisible by. It was first proposed by Carl Albert Grimm in 1969.

Though still unproven, the conjecture has been verified for all $n<1.9\times 10^{10}$.

== Formal statement ==
If $n+1,n+2,\dots,n+k$ are all composite numbers, then there is a sequence of distinct prime numbers $\left(p_i\right)_{i=1}^k$ such that $p_i$ divides $n+i$ for $1 \leq i \leq k$.

=== Weaker version ===
A weaker, though still unproven, version of this conjecture states that if there is no prime in the interval $[n+1, n+k]$, then

$$\prod_{1\,\leq \,x\,\leq \,k}(n+x)$$

has at least $k$ distinct prime divisors.

== Consequences ==
If Grimm's conjecture is true, then

$$p_{i+1} - p_i \ll \Big(\frac{p_i}{\log p_i}\Big)^{1/2}$$

for all consecutive primes $p_i$ and $p_{i+1}$. This goes well beyond what the Riemann hypothesis would imply about gaps between prime numbers: the Riemann hypothesis only implies an upper bound of $O(\sqrt{p_i}(\log p_i))$.

== See also ==
- Prime gap

== Notes ==
- Erdős, P.; Selfridge, J. L. (1971). "Some problems on the prime factors of consecutive integers II". Proceedings of the Washington State University Conference on Number Theory. pp. 13–21. Zbl 228.10028.
- Grimm, C. A. (1969). "A conjecture on consecutive composite numbers". American Mathematical Monthly. 76 (10): 1126–1128. doi:10.2307/2317188. JSTOR 2317188.
- Laishram, Shanta; Murty, M. Ram (2012). "Grimm's conjecture and smooth numbers". Michigan Mathematical Journal. 61 (1): 151–160. arXiv:1306.0765. doi:10.1307/mmj/1331222852.
- Laishram, Shanta; Shorey, T. N. (2006). "Grimm's conjecture on consecutive integers". International Journal of Number Theory. 2 (2): 207–211. doi:10.1142/S1793042106000498.
