= Weird number =

Number that is abundant but not semiperfect

Euler diagram of numbers under 100: Abundant Primitive abundant Highly abundant Superabundant and highly composite Colossally abundant and superior highly composite Weird Perfect Composite Deficient

In number theory, a weird number is a natural number that is abundant but not semiperfect. In other words, the sum of the proper divisors (divisors including 1 but not itself) of the number is greater than the number, but no subset of those divisors sums to the number itself.

== Examples ==
The smallest weird number is 70. Its proper divisors are 1, 2, 5, 7, 10, 14, and 35; these sum to 74, but no subset of these sums to 70. The number 12, for example, is abundant but not weird, because the proper divisors of 12 are 1, 2, 3, 4, and 6, which sum to 16; but 2 + 4 + 6 = 12.

The first several weird numbers are

70, 836, 4030, 5830, 7192, 7912, 9272, 10430, 10570, 10792, 10990, 11410, 11690, 12110, 12530, 12670, 13370, 13510, 13790, 13930, 14770, ... (sequence A006037 in the OEIS).

== Properties ==
Unsolved problem in mathematics
Are there any odd weird numbers?
More unsolved problems in mathematics

Infinitely many weird numbers exist. For example, 70p is weird for all primes p ≥ 149. In fact, the set of weird numbers has positive asymptotic density.

It is not known if any odd weird numbers exist. If so, they must be greater than 10^{21}.

Sidney Kravitz has shown that for k a positive integer, Q a prime exceeding 2^{k}, and

$$R = \frac{2^kQ-(Q+1)}{(Q+1)-2^k}$$

also prime and greater than 2^{k}, then

$$n = 2^{k-1}QR$$

is a weird number. With this formula, he found the large weird number

$$n=2^{56}\cdot(2^{61}-1)\cdot153722867280912929\ \approx\ 2\cdot10^{52}.$$

=== Primitive weird numbers ===
A property of weird numbers is that if n is weird, and p is a prime greater than the sum of divisors σ(n), then pn is also weird. This leads to the definition of primitive weird numbers: weird numbers that are not a multiple of other weird numbers (sequence A002975 in the OEIS). Among the 1765 weird numbers less than one million, there are 24 primitive weird numbers. The construction of Kravitz yields primitive weird numbers, since all weird numbers of the form $2^k p q$ are primitive, but the existence of infinitely many k and Q which yield a prime R is not guaranteed. It is conjectured that there exist infinitely many primitive weird numbers, and Melfi has shown that the infinitude of primitive weird numbers is a consequence of Cramér's conjecture. Primitive weird numbers with as many as 16 prime factors and 14712 digits have been found.

== See also ==
- Untouchable number
