= Theobald of Langres =

Scholastic teacher and author

Theobald of Langres (Note: His name may also be spelled Theobold, and in French Thibaud, Thibaut or Thibault.) (fl. late 12th century) was a scholastic teacher and author, probably a lay schoolmaster, although he has also been identified as a Cistercian. He elaborated and expanded on the work of William of Auberive and Geoffrey of Auxerre, crafting a more systematic theory of numerical symbolism. He left behind one treatise on the subject, De quatuor modis quibus significationes numerorum aperiuntur, (Note: "Concerning the Four Modes in which the Meanings of Numbers are Opened": for the four modes of the title, see Evans (1984), p. 62.) written in a dry style. It has been edited critically by René Delaflie (1978) and Hanne Lange (1979). A bit of Theobald's advice is:

When you want to sacramentize a number [i.e., "make it mean"], you should unfold the aforesaid ways of sacramentizing, and turn them over in your mind, because in such frequent consideration, you may perhaps find what you are looking for, lying hidden. (Note: Quotiens igitur aliquem volueris numerum sacramentare, debes predictos sacramentandi modos explicare, explicitosque revolvere, quia crebra fortassis revolutione, quod queris, invenies inter eos latere.)
