= Superior highly composite number =

Class of natural numbers with many divisors

Divisor function d(n) up to n = 250

Prime-power factors

In number theory, a superior highly composite number is a natural number which, in a particular rigorous sense, has many divisors. Particularly, it is defined by a ratio between the number of divisors an integer has and that integer raised to some positive power.

For any possible exponent, whichever integer has the greatest ratio is a superior highly composite number. It is a stronger restriction than that of a highly composite number, which is defined as having more divisors than any smaller positive integer.

The first ten superior highly composite numbers and their factorization are listed.

# prime factors	SHCN n	Prime factorization	Prime exponents	# divisors d(n)	Primorial factorization
1	2	2	1	2	2
2	6	2 ⋅ 3	1,1	4	6
3	12	2^{2} ⋅ 3	2,1	6	2 ⋅ 6
4	60	2^{2} ⋅ 3 ⋅ 5	2,1,1	12	2 ⋅ 30
5	120	2^{3} ⋅ 3 ⋅ 5	3,1,1	16	2^{2} ⋅ 30
6	360	2^{3} ⋅ 3^{2} ⋅ 5	3,2,1	24	2 ⋅ 6 ⋅ 30
7	2520	2^{3} ⋅ 3^{2} ⋅ 5 ⋅ 7	3,2,1,1	48	2 ⋅ 6 ⋅ 210
8	5040	2^{4} ⋅ 3^{2} ⋅ 5 ⋅ 7	4,2,1,1	60	2^{2} ⋅ 6 ⋅ 210
9	55440	2^{4} ⋅ 3^{2} ⋅ 5 ⋅ 7 ⋅ 11	4,2,1,1,1	120	2^{2} ⋅ 6 ⋅ 2310
10	720720	2^{4} ⋅ 3^{2} ⋅ 5 ⋅ 7 ⋅ 11 ⋅ 13	4,2,1,1,1,1	240	2^{2} ⋅ 6 ⋅ 30030

Plot of the number of divisors of integers from 1 to 1000. Highly composite numbers are labelled in bold and superior highly composite numbers are starred. In the SVG file, hover over a bar to see its statistics.

For a superior highly composite number n there exists a positive real number ε > 0 such that for all natural numbers k > 1 we have
$$\frac{d(n)}{n^\varepsilon}\geq\frac{d(k)}{k^\varepsilon}$$
where d(n), the divisor function, denotes the number of divisors of n. The term was coined by Ramanujan (1915).

For example, the number with the most divisors per square root of the number itself is 12; this can be demonstrated using some highly composites near 12.
$$\frac{2}{2^{0.5}}\approx 1.414, \frac{3}{4^{0.5}}=1.5, \frac{4}{6^{0.5}}\approx 1.633, \frac{6}{12^{0.5}}\approx 1.732, \frac{8}{24^{0.5}}\approx 1.633, \frac{12}{60^{0.5}}\approx 1.549$$

120 is another superior highly composite number because it has the highest ratio of divisors to itself raised to the 0.4 power.
$$\frac{9}{36^{0.4}}\approx 2.146, \frac{10}{48^{0.4}}\approx 2.126, \frac{12}{60^{0.4}}\approx 2.333, \frac{16}{120^{0.4}}\approx 2.357, \frac{18}{180^{0.4}}\approx 2.255, \frac{20}{240^{0.4}}\approx 2.233, \frac{24}{360^{0.4}}\approx 2.279$$

The first 15 superior highly composite numbers, 2, 6, 12, 60, 120, 360, 2520, 5040, 55440, 720720, 1441440, 4324320, 21621600, 367567200, 6983776800 (sequence A002201 in the OEIS) are also the first 15 colossally abundant numbers, which meet a similar condition based on the sum-of-divisors function rather than the number of divisors. Neither set, however, is a subset of the other.

== Properties ==
Euler diagram of numbers under 100: Abundant Primitive abundant Highly abundant Superabundant and highly composite Colossally abundant and superior highly composite Weird Perfect Composite Deficient

All superior highly composite numbers are highly composite. This is easy to prove: if there is some number k that has the same number of divisors as n but is less than n itself (i.e. $d(k) = d(n)$, but $k<n$), then $\frac{d(k)}{k^\varepsilon} > \frac{d(n)}{n^\varepsilon}$ for all positive ε, so if a number "n" is not highly composite, it cannot be superior highly composite.

An effective construction of the set of all superior highly composite numbers is given by the following monotonic mapping from the positive real numbers. Let
$$e_p(x) = \left\lfloor \frac{1}{\sqrt[x]{p} - 1} \right\rfloor$$
for any prime number p and positive real x. Then
$$s(x) = \prod_{p \in \mathbb{P}} p^{e_p(x)}$$
is a superior highly composite number.

Note that the product need not be computed indefinitely, because if $p > 2^x$ then $e_p(x) = 0$, so the product to calculate $s(x)$ can be terminated once $p \ge 2^x$.

Also note that in the definition of $e_p(x)$, $1/x$ is analogous to $\varepsilon$ in the implicit definition of a superior highly composite number.

Moreover, for each superior highly composite number $s'$ exists a half-open interval $I \subset \R^+$ such that $\forall x \in I: s(x) = s'$.

This representation implies that there exist an infinite sequence of $\pi_1, \pi_2, \ldots \in \mathbb{P}$ such that for the n-th superior highly composite number $s_n$ holds
$$s_n = \prod_{i=1}^n \pi_i$$

The first $\pi_i$ are 2, 3, 2, 5, 2, 3, 7, ... (sequence A000705 in the OEIS). In other words, the quotient of two successive superior highly composite numbers is a prime number.

== Radices ==
The first few superior highly composite numbers have often been used as radices, due to their high divisibility for their size. For example:

- Binary (base 2)
- Senary (base 6)
- Duodecimal (base 12)
- Sexagesimal (base 60)

Bigger SHCNs can be used in other ways. 120 appears as the long hundred, while 360 appears as the number of degrees in a circle.
