= Primitive abundant number =

Abundant number whose proper divisors are all deficient numbers

Euler diagram of numbers under 100: Abundant Primitive abundant Highly abundant Superabundant and highly composite Colossally abundant and superior highly composite Weird Perfect Composite Deficient

In mathematics, a primitive abundant number is an abundant number whose proper divisors are all deficient numbers.

For example, 20 is a primitive abundant number because:

1. The sum of its proper divisors is 1 + 2 + 4 + 5 + 10 = 22, so 20 is an abundant number.
2. The sums of the proper divisors of 1, 2, 4, 5 and 10 are 0, 1, 3, 1 and 8 respectively, so each of these numbers is a deficient number.

The first few primitive abundant numbers are:

20, 70, 88, 104, 272, 304, 368, 464, 550, 572 ... (sequence A071395 in the OEIS)

The smallest odd primitive abundant number is 945.

A variant definition is abundant numbers having no abundant proper divisor, which can also include divisors that are perfect numbers. It starts:

12, 18, 20, 30, 42, 56, 66, 70, 78, 88, 102, 104, 114 ... (sequence A091191 in the OEIS)

== Properties ==
Every multiple of a primitive abundant number is an abundant number.

Every abundant number is a multiple of a primitive abundant number or a multiple of a perfect number.

Every primitive abundant number is either a primitive semiperfect number or a weird number.

There are an infinite number of primitive abundant numbers.

The number of primitive abundant numbers less than or equal to n is $o \left( \frac{n}{\log^2(n)} \right)\,$.
