= Superabundant number =

Class of natural numbers

In mathematics, a superabundant number is a kind of natural number. A natural number n is called superabundant precisely when, for all m < n:

$$\frac{\sigma(m)}{m} < \frac{\sigma(n)}{n}$$

where σ denotes the sum-of-divisors function (i.e., the sum of all positive divisors of n, including n itself). The first few superabundant numbers are 1, 2, 4, 6, 12, 24, 36, 48, 60, 120, ... (sequence A004394 in the OEIS). For example, the number 5 is not a superabundant number because for 1, 2, 3, 4, and 5, the sigma is 1, 3, 4, 7, 6, and 7/4 > 6/5.

Superabundant numbers were defined by Leonidas Alaoglu and Paul Erdős (1944). Unknown to Alaoglu and Erdős, about 30 pages of Ramanujan's 1915 paper "Highly Composite Numbers" were suppressed. Those pages were finally published in The Ramanujan Journal 1 (1997), 119–153. In section 59 of that paper, Ramanujan defines generalized highly composite numbers, which include the superabundant numbers.

== Properties ==
Euler diagram of numbers under 100: Abundant Primitive abundant Highly abundant Superabundant and highly composite Colossally abundant and superior highly composite Weird Perfect Composite Deficient

Leonidas Alaoglu and Paul Erdős (1944) proved that if n is superabundant, then there exist a k and a_{1}, a_{2}, ..., a_{k} such that

$$n=\prod_{i=1}^k (p_i)^{a_i}$$

where p_{i} is the i-th prime number, and

$$a_1\geq a_2\geq\dotsb\geq a_k\geq 1.$$

That is, they proved that if n is superabundant, the prime decomposition of n has non-increasing exponents (the exponent of a larger prime is never more than that of a smaller prime) and that all primes up to $p_k$ are factors of n. Then in particular any superabundant number is an even integer, and it is a multiple of the k-th primorial $p_k\#.$

In fact, the last exponent a_{k} is equal to 1 except when n is 4 or 36.

Superabundant numbers are closely related to highly composite numbers. Not all superabundant numbers are highly composite numbers. In fact, only 449 superabundant and highly composite numbers are the same (sequence A166981 in the OEIS). For instance, 7560 is highly composite but not superabundant. Conversely, 1163962800 is superabundant but not highly composite.

Alaoglu and Erdős observed that all superabundant numbers are highly abundant.

Not all superabundant numbers are Harshad numbers. The first exception is the 105th superabundant number, 149602080797769600. The digit sum is 81, but 81 does not divide evenly into this superabundant number.

Superabundant numbers are also of interest in connection with the Riemann hypothesis, and with Robin's theorem that the Riemann hypothesis is equivalent to the statement that

$$\frac{\sigma(n)}{e^\gamma n\log\log n} < 1$$

for all n greater than the largest known exception, the superabundant number 5040. If this inequality has a larger counterexample, proving the Riemann hypothesis to be false, the smallest such counterexample must be a superabundant number (Akbary & Friggstad 2009).

Not all superabundant numbers are colossally abundant.

== Extension ==
The generalized $k$-super abundant numbers are those such that $\frac{\sigma_k(m)}{m^k} < \frac{\sigma_k(n)}{n^k}$ for all $m < n$, where $\sigma_k(n)$ is the sum of the $k$-th powers of the divisors of $n$.

1-super abundant numbers are superabundant numbers. 0-super abundant numbers are highly composite numbers.

For example, generalized 2-super abundant numbers are 1, 2, 4, 6, 12, 24, 48, 60, 120, 240, ... (sequence A208767 in the OEIS)
