= 360 (number) =

← 359	360	361 →
- List of numbers; Integers; ← 0 100 200 300 400 500 600 700 800 900 →
- Cardinal: three hundred sixty
- Ordinal: 360th (three hundred sixtieth)
- Factorization: 2^{3} × 3^{2} × 5
- Divisors: 1, 2, 3, 4, 5, 6, 8, 9, 10, 12, 15, 18, 20, 24, 30, 36, 40, 45, 60, 72, 90, 120, 180, 360
- Greek numeral: ΤΞ´
- Roman numeral: CCCLX, ccclx
- Binary: 101101000_{2}
- Ternary: 111100_{3}
- Senary: 1400_{6}
- Octal: 550_{8}
- Duodecimal: 260_{12}
- Hexadecimal: 168_{16}

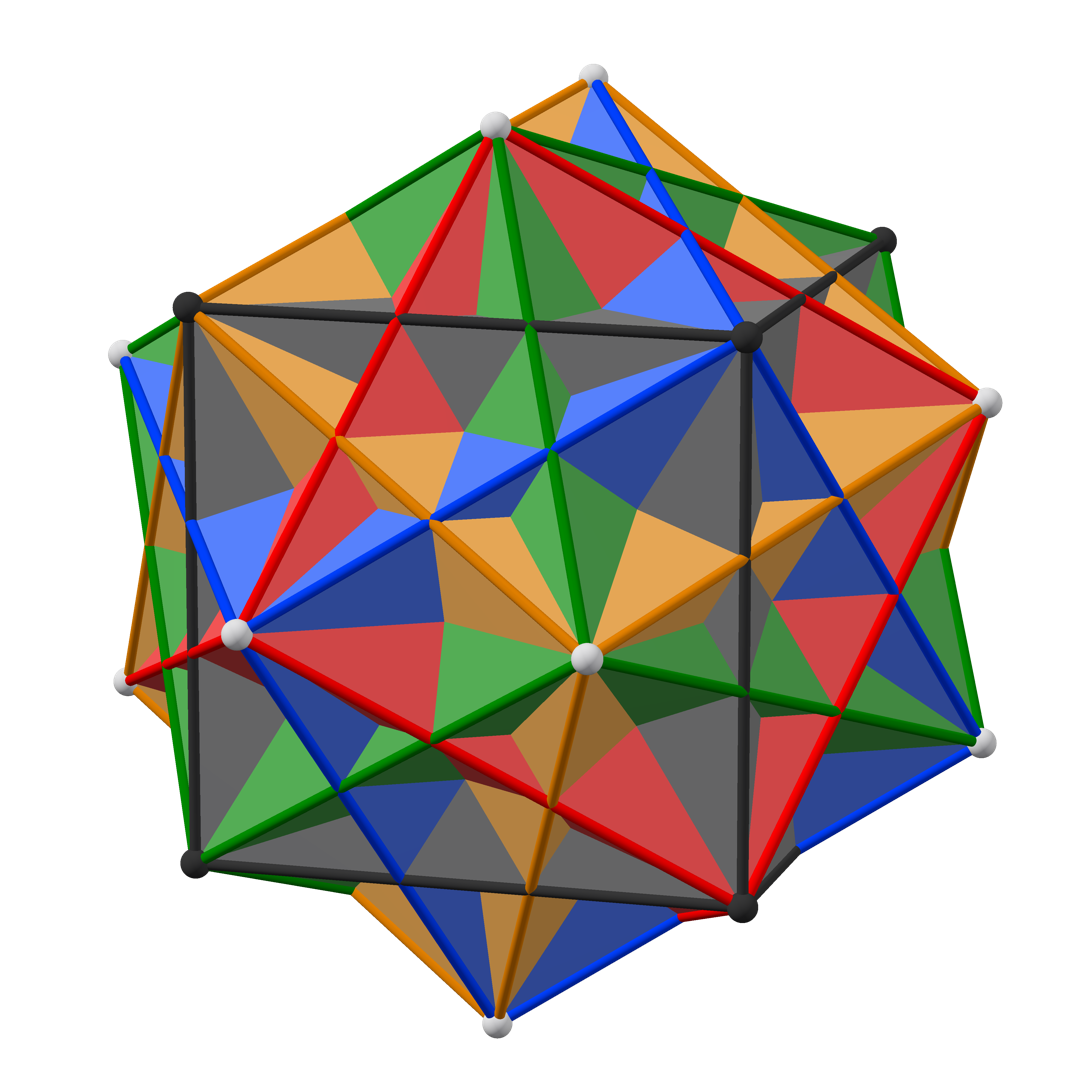
The surface of the compound of five cubes consists of 360 triangles.

360 (three hundred [and] sixty) is the natural number following 359 and preceding 361.

== In mathematics ==
- 360 is the 13th highly composite number and one of only seven numbers such that no number less than twice as much has more divisors; the others are 1, 2, 6, 12, 60, and 2520 (sequence A072938 in the OEIS).
- 360 is also the 6th superior highly composite number, the 6th colossally abundant number, a refactorable number, a 5-smooth number, and a Harshad number in decimal since the sum of its digits (9) is a divisor of 360.
- 360 is divisible by the number of its divisors (24), and it is the smallest number divisible by every natural number from 1 to 10, except 7. Furthermore, one of the divisors of 360 is 72, which is the number of primes below it.
- 360 is the sum of twin primes (179 + 181) and the sum of four consecutive powers of three (9 + 27 + 81 + 243).
- The sum of Euler's totient function φ(x) over the first thirty-four integers is 360.
- 360 is a triangular matchstick number.
- 360 is the product of the first two unitary perfect numbers: $60 \times 6 = 360.$
- There are 360 even permutations of 6 elements. They form the alternating group A_{6}.

A turn is divided into 360 degrees for angular measurement. 360° = 2π rad is also called a round angle. This unit choice divides round angles into equal sectors measured in integer rather than fractional degrees. Many angles commonly appearing in planimetrics have an integer number of degrees. For a simple non-intersecting polygon, the sum of the internal angles of a quadrilateral always equals 360 degrees.

== Sources ==
- Wells, D. (1987). The Penguin Dictionary of Curious and Interesting Numbers (p. 152). London: Penguin Group.
