= Highly composite number =

Numbers with many divisors

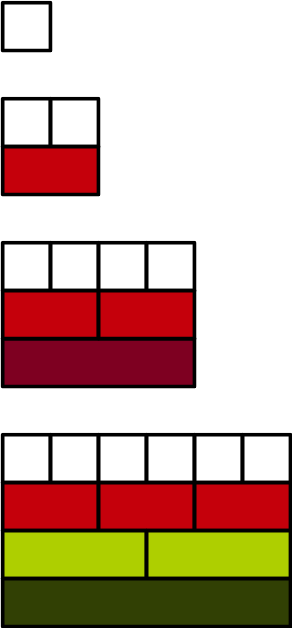
Demonstration, with Cuisenaire rods, of the first four highly composite numbers: 1, 2, 4, 6

A highly composite number is a positive integer that has more divisors than all smaller positive integers. If d(n) denotes the number of divisors of a positive integer n, then a positive integer N is highly composite if d(N) > d(n) for all n < N. For example, 6 is highly composite because d(6) = 4, and for n = 1,2,3,4,5, you get d(n) = 1,2,2,3,2, respectively, which are all less than 4.

A related concept is that of a largely composite number, a positive integer that has at least as many divisors as all smaller positive integers. The name can be somewhat misleading, as the first two highly composite numbers (1 and 2) are not actually composite numbers; however, all further terms are.

Ramanujan wrote a paper on highly composite numbers in 1915.

The mathematician Jean-Pierre Kahane suggested that Plato must have known about highly composite numbers, as he chose such a number, 5040 (not only a highly composite number, but also a superior highly composite number, and also = 7!), as the ideal number of citizens in a city. Furthermore, Vardoulakis and Pugh's paper delves into a similar inquiry concerning the number 5040.

== Examples ==
The first 41 highly composite numbers (HCN) are listed in the table below (sequence A002182 in the OEIS). The number of divisors of corresponding HCN is given in the column labeled d(n). Asterisks indicate superior highly composite numbers.

Order	HCN n	prime factorization	prime exponents	number of prime factors (sequence A001222 in the OEIS)	d(n)	primorial factorization
1	1			0	1	
2	2*	$2$	1	1	2	$2$
3	4	$2^2$	2	2	3	$2^2$
4	6*	$2\cdot 3$	1,1	2	4	$6$
5	12*	$2^2\cdot 3$	2,1	3	6	$2\cdot 6$
6	24	$2^3\cdot 3$	3,1	4	8	$2^2\cdot 6$
7	36	$2^2\cdot 3^2$	2,2	4	9	$6^2$
8	48	$2^4\cdot 3$	4,1	5	10	$2^3\cdot 6$
9	60*	$2^2\cdot 3\cdot 5$	2,1,1	4	12	$2\cdot 30$
10	120*	$2^3\cdot 3\cdot 5$	3,1,1	5	16	$2^2\cdot 30$
11	180	$2^2\cdot 3^2\cdot 5$	2,2,1	5	18	$6\cdot 30$
12	240	$2^4\cdot 3\cdot 5$	4,1,1	6	20	$2^3\cdot 30$
13	360*	$2^3\cdot 3^2\cdot 5$	3,2,1	6	24	$2\cdot 6\cdot 30$
14	720	$2^4\cdot 3^2\cdot 5$	4,2,1	7	30	$2^2\cdot 6\cdot 30$
15	840	$2^3\cdot 3\cdot 5\cdot 7$	3,1,1,1	6	32	$2^2\cdot 210$
16	1260	$2^2\cdot 3^2\cdot 5\cdot 7$	2,2,1,1	6	36	$6\cdot 210$
17	1680	$2^4\cdot 3\cdot 5\cdot 7$	4,1,1,1	7	40	$2^3\cdot 210$
18	2520*	$2^3\cdot 3^2\cdot 5\cdot 7$	3,2,1,1	7	48	$2\cdot 6\cdot 210$
19	5040*	$2^4\cdot 3^2\cdot 5\cdot 7$	4,2,1,1	8	60	$2^2\cdot 6\cdot 210$
20	7560	$2^3\cdot 3^3\cdot 5\cdot 7$	3,3,1,1	8	64	$6^2\cdot 210$
21	10080	$2^5\cdot 3^2\cdot 5\cdot 7$	5,2,1,1	9	72	$2^3\cdot 6\cdot 210$
22	15120	$2^4\cdot 3^3\cdot 5\cdot 7$	4,3,1,1	9	80	$2\cdot 6^2\cdot 210$
23	20160	$2^6\cdot 3^2\cdot 5\cdot 7$	6,2,1,1	10	84	$2^4\cdot 6\cdot 210$
24	25200	$2^4\cdot 3^2\cdot 5^2\cdot 7$	4,2,2,1	9	90	$2^2\cdot 30\cdot 210$
25	27720	$2^3\cdot 3^2\cdot 5\cdot 7\cdot 11$	3,2,1,1,1	8	96	$2\cdot 6\cdot 2310$
26	45360	$2^4\cdot 3^4\cdot 5\cdot 7$	4,4,1,1	10	100	$6^3\cdot 210$
27	50400	$2^5\cdot 3^2\cdot 5^2\cdot 7$	5,2,2,1	10	108	$2^3\cdot 30\cdot 210$
28	55440*	$2^4\cdot 3^2\cdot 5\cdot 7\cdot 11$	4,2,1,1,1	9	120	$2^2\cdot 6\cdot 2310$
29	83160	$2^3\cdot 3^3\cdot 5\cdot 7\cdot 11$	3,3,1,1,1	9	128	$6^2\cdot 2310$
30	110880	$2^5\cdot 3^2\cdot 5\cdot 7\cdot 11$	5,2,1,1,1	10	144	$2^3\cdot 6\cdot 2310$
31	166320	$2^4\cdot 3^3\cdot 5\cdot 7\cdot 11$	4,3,1,1,1	10	160	$2\cdot 6^2\cdot 2310$
32	221760	$2^6\cdot 3^2\cdot 5\cdot 7\cdot 11$	6,2,1,1,1	11	168	$2^4\cdot 6\cdot 2310$
33	277200	$2^4\cdot 3^2\cdot 5^2\cdot 7\cdot 11$	4,2,2,1,1	10	180	$2^2\cdot 30\cdot 2310$
34	332640	$2^5\cdot 3^3\cdot 5\cdot 7\cdot 11$	5,3,1,1,1	11	192	$2^2\cdot 6^2\cdot 2310$
35	498960	$2^4\cdot 3^4\cdot 5\cdot 7\cdot 11$	4,4,1,1,1	11	200	$6^3\cdot 2310$
36	554400	$2^5\cdot 3^2\cdot 5^2\cdot 7\cdot 11$	5,2,2,1,1	11	216	$2^3\cdot 30\cdot 2310$
37	665280	$2^6\cdot 3^3\cdot 5\cdot 7\cdot 11$	6,3,1,1,1	12	224	$2^3\cdot 6^2\cdot 2310$
38	720720*	$2^4\cdot 3^2\cdot 5\cdot 7\cdot 11\cdot 13$	4,2,1,1,1,1	10	240	$2^2\cdot 6\cdot 30030$
39	1081080	$2^3\cdot 3^3\cdot 5\cdot 7\cdot 11\cdot 13$	3,3,1,1,1,1	10	256	$6^2\cdot 30030$
40	1441440*	$2^5\cdot 3^2\cdot 5\cdot 7\cdot 11\cdot 13$	5,2,1,1,1,1	11	288	$2^3\cdot 6\cdot 30030$
41	2162160	$2^4\cdot 3^3\cdot 5\cdot 7\cdot 11\cdot 13$	4,3,1,1,1,1	11	320	$2\cdot 6^2\cdot 30030$

The divisors of the first 20 highly composite numbers are shown below.

n	d(n)	Divisors of n
1	1	1
2	2	1, 2
4	3	1, 2, 4
6	4	1, 2, 3, 6
12	6	1, 2, 3, 4, 6, 12
24	8	1, 2, 3, 4, 6, 8, 12, 24
36	9	1, 2, 3, 4, 6, 9, 12, 18, 36
48	10	1, 2, 3, 4, 6, 8, 12, 16, 24, 48
60	12	1, 2, 3, 4, 5, 6, 10, 12, 15, 20, 30, 60
120	16	1, 2, 3, 4, 5, 6, 8, 10, 12, 15, 20, 24, 30, 40, 60, 120
180	18	1, 2, 3, 4, 5, 6, 9, 10, 12, 15, 18, 20, 30, 36, 45, 60, 90, 180
240	20	1, 2, 3, 4, 5, 6, 8, 10, 12, 15, 16, 20, 24, 30, 40, 48, 60, 80, 120, 240
360	24	1, 2, 3, 4, 5, 6, 8, 9, 10, 12, 15, 18, 20, 24, 30, 36, 40, 45, 60, 72, 90, 120, 180, 360
720	30	1, 2, 3, 4, 5, 6, 8, 9, 10, 12, 15, 16, 18, 20, 24, 30, 36, 40, 45, 48, 60, 72, 80, 90, 120, 144, 180, 240, 360, 720
840	32	1, 2, 3, 4, 5, 6, 7, 8, 10, 12, 14, 15, 20, 21, 24, 28, 30, 35, 40, 42, 56, 60, 70, 84, 105, 120, 140, 168, 210, 280, 420, 840
1260	36	1, 2, 3, 4, 5, 6, 7, 9, 10, 12, 14, 15, 18, 20, 21, 28, 30, 35, 36, 42, 45, 60, 63, 70, 84, 90, 105, 126, 140, 180, 210, 252, 315, 420, 630, 1260
1680	40	1, 2, 3, 4, 5, 6, 7, 8, 10, 12, 14, 15, 16, 20, 21, 24, 28, 30, 35, 40, 42, 48, 56, 60, 70, 80, 84, 105, 112, 120, 140, 168, 210, 240, 280, 336, 420, 560, 840, 1680
2520	48	1, 2, 3, 4, 5, 6, 7, 8, 9, 10, 12, 14, 15, 18, 20, 21, 24, 28, 30, 35, 36, 40, 42, 45, 56, 60, 63, 70, 72, 84, 90, 105, 120, 126, 140, 168, 180, 210, 252, 280, 315, 360, 420, 504, 630, 840, 1260, 2520
5040	60	1, 2, 3, 4, 5, 6, 7, 8, 9, 10, 12, 14, 15, 16, 18, 20, 21, 24, 28, 30, 35, 36, 40, 42, 45, 48, 56, 60, 63, 70, 72, 80, 84, 90, 105, 112, 120, 126, 140, 144, 168, 180, 210, 240, 252, 280, 315, 336, 360, 420, 504, 560, 630, 720, 840, 1008, 1260, 1680, 2520, 5040
7560	64	1, 2, 3, 4, 5, 6, 7, 8, 9, 10, 12, 14, 15, 18, 20, 21, 24, 27, 28, 30, 35, 36, 40, 42, 45, 54, 56, 60, 63, 70, 72, 84, 90, 105, 108, 120, 126, 135, 140, 168, 180, 189, 210, 216, 252, 270, 280, 315, 360, 378, 420, 504, 540, 630, 756, 840, 945, 1080, 1260, 1512, 1890, 2520, 3780, 7560

The table below shows all 72 divisors of 10080 by writing it as a product of two numbers in 36 different ways.

**The highly composite number: 10080**; 10080 = (2 × 2 × 2 × 2 × 2) × (3 × 3) × 5 × 7
**1** × **10080**	**2** × **5040**	3 × 3360	**4** × **2520**	5 × 2016	**6** × **1680**
7 × 1440	8 × **1260**	9 × 1120	10 × 1008	**12** × **840**	14 × **720**
15 × 672	16 × 630	18 × 560	20 × 504	21 × 480	**24** × 420
28 × **360**	30 × 336	32 × 315	35 × 288	**36** × 280	40 × 252
42 × **240**	45 × 224	**48** × 210	56 × **180**	**60** × 168	63 × 160
70 × 144	72 × 140	80 × 126	84 × **120**	90 × 112	96 × 105
Note: Numbers in **bold** are themselves **highly composite numbers**. Only the twentieth highly composite number 7560 (= 3 × 2520) is absent. 10080 is a so-called 7-smooth number (sequence A002473 in the OEIS).

The 15,000-th highly composite number is the product of 230 primes:

$$a_0^{14} a_1^9 a_2^6 a_3^4 a_4^4 a_5^3 a_6^3 a_7^3 a_8^2 a_9^2 a_{10}^2 a_{11}^2 a_{12}^2 a_{13}^2 a_{14}^2 a_{15}^2 a_{16}^2 a_{17}^2 a_{18}^{2} a_{19} a_{20} a_{21}\cdots a_{229},$$

where $a_n$ is the $n$th successive prime number, and all omitted terms (a_{22} to a_{228}) are factors with exponent equal to one (i.e. the number is $2^{14} \times 3^{9} \times 5^6 \times \cdots \times 1451$). More concisely, it is the product of seven distinct primorials:

$$b_0^5 b_1^3 b_2^2 b_4 b_7 b_{18} b_{229},$$

where $b_n$ is the primorial $a_0a_1\cdots a_n$.

== Prime factorization ==
Plot of the number of divisors of integers from 1 to 1000. Highly composite numbers are labelled in bold and superior highly composite numbers are starred. In the SVG file, hover over a bar to see its statistics.

Roughly speaking, for a number to be highly composite it has to have prime factors as small as possible, but not too many of the same. By the fundamental theorem of arithmetic, every positive integer n has a unique prime factorization:

$$n = p_1^{c_1} \times p_2^{c_2} \times \cdots \times p_k^{c_k}$$

where $p_1 < p_2 < \cdots < p_k$ are prime, and the exponents $c_i$ are positive integers.

Any factor of n must have the same or lesser multiplicity in each prime:

$$p_1^{d_1} \times p_2^{d_2} \times \cdots \times p_k^{d_k}, 0 \leq d_i \leq c_i, 0 < i \leq k$$

So the number of divisors of n is:

$$d(n) = (c_1 + 1) \times (c_2 + 1) \times \cdots \times (c_k + 1).$$

Hence, for a highly composite number n,

- the k given prime numbers p_{i} must be precisely the first k prime numbers (2, 3, 5, ...); if not, we could replace one of the given primes by a smaller prime, and thus obtain a smaller number than n with the same number of divisors (for instance 10 = 2 × 5 may be replaced with 6 = 2 × 3; both have four divisors);
- the sequence of exponents must be non-increasing, that is $c_1 \geq c_2 \geq \cdots \geq c_k$; otherwise, by exchanging two exponents we would again get a smaller number than n with the same number of divisors (for instance 18 = 2^{1} × 3^{2} may be replaced with 12 = 2^{2} × 3^{1}; both have six divisors).

Also, except in two special cases n = 4 and n = 36, the last exponent c_{k} must equal 1. It means that 1, 4, and 36 are the only square highly composite numbers. Saying that the sequence of exponents is non-increasing is equivalent to saying that a highly composite number is a product of primorials or, alternatively, the smallest number for its prime signature.

Note that although the above described conditions are necessary, they are not sufficient for a number to be highly composite. For example, 96 = 2^{5} × 3 satisfies the above conditions and has 12 divisors but is not highly composite since there is a smaller number (60) which has the same number of divisors.

== Asymptotic growth and density ==
If Q(x) denotes the number of highly composite numbers less than or equal to x, then there are two constants a and b, both greater than 1, such that

$$(\log x)^a \le Q(x) \le (\log x)^b \, .$$

The first part of the inequality was proved by Paul Erdős in 1944 and the second part by Jean-Louis Nicolas in 1988. We have

$$1.13682 < \liminf_{x\,\to\,\infty} \frac{\log Q(x)}{\log\log x} \le 1.44 \$$

and

$\limsup_{x\,\to\,\infty} \frac{\log Q(x)}{\log\log x} \le 1.71 \ .$

== Related sequences ==
Euler diagram of numbers under 100: Abundant Primitive abundant Highly abundant Superabundant and highly composite Colossally abundant and superior highly composite Weird Perfect Composite Deficient

Highly composite numbers greater than 6 are also abundant numbers. One need only look at the three largest proper divisors of a particular highly composite number to ascertain this fact. It is false that all highly composite numbers are also Harshad numbers in base 10. The first highly composite number that is not a Harshad number is 245,044,800; it has a digit sum of 27, which does not divide evenly into 245,044,800.

10 of the first 38 highly composite numbers are superior highly composite numbers. The sequence of highly composite numbers (sequence A002182 in the OEIS) is a subset of the sequence of smallest numbers k with exactly n divisors (sequence A005179 in the OEIS).

Highly composite numbers whose number of divisors is also a highly composite number are

1, 2, 6, 12, 60, 360, 1260, 2520, 5040, 55440, 277200, 720720, 3603600, 61261200, 2205403200, 293318625600, 6746328388800, 195643523275200 (sequence A189394 in the OEIS).

It is known that this sequence is complete.

A positive integer n is a largely composite number if d(n) ≥ d(m) for all m ≤ n. The counting function Q_{L}(x) of largely composite numbers satisfies

$$(\log x)^c \le \log Q_L(x) \le (\log x)^d \$$

for positive c and d with $0.2 \le c \le d \le 0.5$.

Because the prime factorization of a highly composite number uses all of the first k primes, every highly composite number must be a practical number. Due to their ease of use in calculations involving fractions, many of these numbers are used in traditional systems of measurement and engineering designs.

== See also ==
- Superior highly composite number
- Highly totient number
- Table of divisors
- Euler's totient function
- Round number
- Smooth number
