= Thomas Hakon Grönwall =

Swedish mathematician (1877–1932)

- Born: 16 January 1877; Dylta bruk, Sweden
- Died: 9 May 1932 (aged 55); New York City, New York, U.S.
- Known for: Grönwall's inequality Grönwall's area theorem Grönwall's theorem (divisor function)
- Parent(s): Carl Theodor Grönwall(father); Laura Elisabeth Billqvist(mother)

Thomas Hakon Grönwall or Thomas Hakon Gronwall (born Hakon Tomi Grönwall; January 16, 1877 in Dylta bruk, Sweden – May 9, 1932 in New York City, New York) was a Swedish mathematician. He studied at the University College of Stockholm and Uppsala University and completed his Ph.D. at Uppsala in 1898. Grönwall worked for about a year as a civil engineer in Germany before he emigrated to the United States in 1904. He later taught mathematics at Princeton University and from 1925 he was a member of the physics department at Columbia University.

In 1925 he started to collaborate with Victor LaMer, which led to his joining the Department of Physics at Columbia University as an associate in 1927. This connection was a great opportunity. There were no teaching obligations; he had complete control of his own time and an abundance of new intriguing problems to address in physical chemistry and in atomic physics. He developed an analytical solution to the Poisson-Boltzmann equation as it appears in the Debye–Hückel theory

== See also ==
- Grönwall's area theorem
- Grönwall's inequality
- Grönwall's theorem
