= Aliquot sum =

Sum of all proper divisors of a natural number

In number theory, the aliquot sum s(n) of a positive integer n is the sum of all proper divisors of n, that is, all divisors of n other than n itself. That is,
$$s(n)=\sum_{{d|n,} \atop {d\ne n}} d \, .$$

It can be used to characterize the prime numbers, perfect numbers, sociable numbers, deficient numbers, abundant numbers, and untouchable numbers, and to define the aliquot sequence of a number.

The word aliquot comes from Latin, combining alius ("other", "else") and quot ("how many").

== Examples ==
For example, the proper divisors of 12 (that is, the positive divisors of 12 that are not equal to 12) are 1, 2, 3, 4, and 6, so the aliquot sum of 12 is 16 i.e. (1 + 2 + 3 + 4 + 6).

The values of s(n) for n = 1, 2, 3, ... are:

0, 1, 1, 3, 1, 6, 1, 7, 4, 8, 1, 16, 1, 10, 9, 15, 1, 21, 1, 22, 11, 14, 1, 36, 6, 16, 13, 28, 1, 42, 1, 31, 15, 20, 13, 55, 1, 22, 17, 50, 1, 54, 1, 40, 33, 26, 1, 76, 8, 43, ... (sequence A001065 in the OEIS)

== Characterization of classes of numbers ==
The aliquot sum function can be used to characterize several notable classes of numbers:

- 1 is the only number whose aliquot sum is 0.
- A number is prime if and only if its aliquot sum is 1.
- The aliquot sums of perfect, deficient, and abundant numbers are equal to, less than, and greater than the number itself respectively. The quasiperfect numbers (if such numbers exist) are the numbers n whose aliquot sums equal n + 1. The almost perfect numbers (which include the powers of 2, being the only known such numbers so far) are the numbers n whose aliquot sums equal n − 1.
- The untouchable numbers are the numbers that are not the aliquot sum of any other number. Their study goes back at least to Abu Mansur al-Baghdadi (circa 1000 AD), who observed that both 2 and 5 are untouchable. Paul Erdős proved that their number is infinite. The conjecture that 5 is the only odd untouchable number remains unproven, but would follow from a form of Goldbach's conjecture together with the observation that, for a semiprime number pq, the aliquot sum is p + q + 1.

The mathematicians Pollack & Pomerance (2016) noted that one of Erdős' "favorite subjects of investigation" was the aliquot sum function.

== Iteration ==
Iterating the aliquot sum function produces the aliquot sequence n, s(n), s(s(n)), … of a nonnegative integer n (in this sequence, we define s(0) = 0).

Sociable numbers are numbers whose aliquot sequence is a periodic sequence. Amicable numbers are sociable numbers whose aliquot sequence has period 2.

It remains unknown whether these sequences always end with a prime number, a perfect number, or a periodic sequence of sociable numbers.

== See also ==
- Sum of positive divisors function, the sum of the (xth powers of the) positive divisors of a number
- William of Auberive, medieval numerologist interested in aliquot sums
