= Deficient number =

Number that is more than the sum of its proper divisors

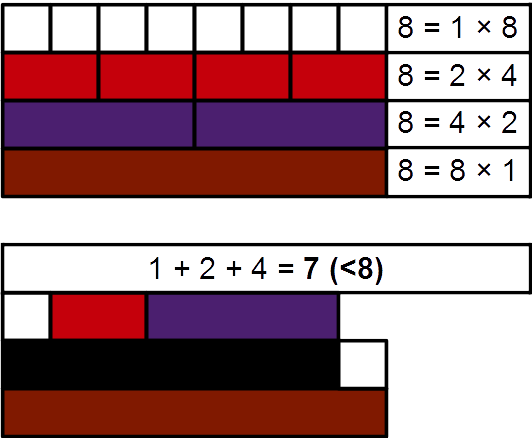
Demonstration, with Cuisenaire rods, of the deficiency of the number 8

In number theory, a deficient number or defective number is a positive integer n for which the sum of divisors of n is less than 2n. Equivalently, it is a number for which the sum of proper divisors (or aliquot sum) is less than n. For example, the proper divisors of 8 are 1, 2, and 4, and their sum is 7 which is less than 8, so 8 is deficient.

== Examples ==
The first few deficient numbers are

1, 2, 3, 4, 5, 7, 8, 9, 10, 11, 13, 14, 15, 16, 17, 19, 21, 22, 23, 25, 26, 27, 29, 31, 32, 33, 34, 35, 37, 38, 39, 41, 43, 44, 45, 46, 47, 49, 50, ... (sequence A005100 in the OEIS)

As an example, consider the number 21. Its proper divisors are 1, 3 and 7, and their sum is 11. Because 11 is less than 21, the number 21 is deficient. Its deficiency is 21 − 11 = 10.

== Properties ==
Since the aliquot sums of prime numbers equal 1, all prime numbers are deficient. More generally, all odd numbers with one or two distinct prime factors are deficient. It follows that there are infinitely many odd deficient numbers. There are also an infinite number of even deficient numbers as all powers of two have the sum (1 + 2 + 4 + 8 + ... + 2^{x − 1} = 2^{x} − 1). The infinite family of numbers of form 2^{n − 1} × p^{m} where m > 0 and p is a prime > 2^{n} − 1 are also deficient.

More generally, all prime powers $p^k$ are deficient, because their only proper divisors are $1, p, p^2, \dots, p^{k-1}$ which sum to $\frac{p^k-1}{p-1}$, which is at most $p^k-1$.

All proper divisors of deficient numbers are deficient. Moreover, all proper divisors of perfect numbers are deficient.

There exists at least one deficient number in the interval $[n, n + (\log n)^2]$ for all sufficiently large n.

== Related concepts ==
Euler diagram of numbers under 100: Abundant Primitive abundant Highly abundant Superabundant and highly composite Colossally abundant and superior highly composite Weird Perfect Composite Deficient

Closely related to deficient numbers are perfect numbers with σ(n) = 2n, and abundant numbers with σ(n) > 2n.

Nicomachus was the first to subdivide numbers into deficient, perfect, or abundant, in his Introduction to Arithmetic (circa 100 CE). However, he applied this classification only to the even numbers.

== See also ==
- Almost perfect number
- Amicable number
- Sociable number
- Superabundant number
