= Jean-Louis Nicolas =

French mathematician

Jean-Louis Nicolas is a French number theorist.

He is the namesake (with Paul Erdős) of the Erdős–Nicolas numbers, and was a frequent co-author of Erdős, who would take over the desk of Nicolas' wife Anne-Marie (also a mathematician) whenever he would visit. Nicolas is also known for his research on integer partitions, and for his unusual proof that there exist infinitely many n for which

$$\varphi(n) < e^{-\gamma}\frac  {n} {\log \log n}$$

where $\varphi(n)$ is Euler's totient function and γ is Euler's constant: he proved this bound unconditionally by providing two different proofs, one in the case that the Riemann hypothesis holds and another in the case that it fails.

Nicolas earned his Ph.D. in 1968 as a student of Charles Pisot. He works at Claude Bernard University Lyon 1.

A conference in honor of Nicolas' 60th birthday was held on January 14–19, 2002 at the Centre International de Rencontres Mathématiques in Marseille. The proceedings of the conference were published as a festschrift in The Ramanujan Journal.
