= Abundant number =

Number that is less than the sum of its proper divisors

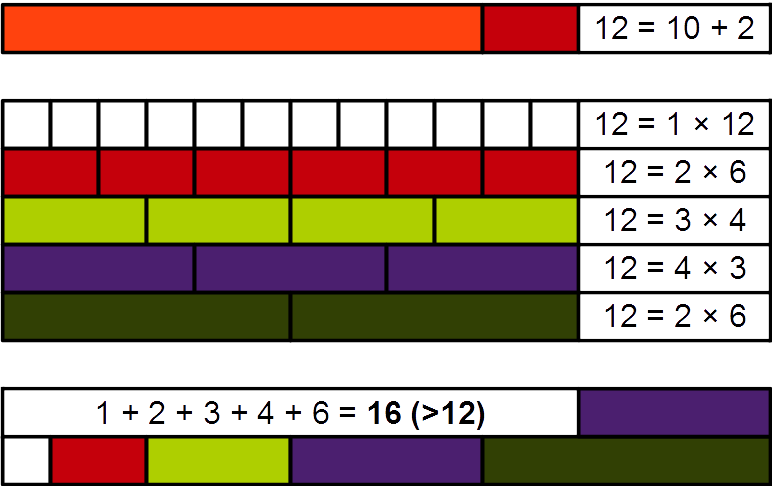
Demonstration, with Cuisenaire rods, of the abundance of the number 12

In number theory, an abundant number or excessive number is a positive integer for which the sum of its proper divisors is greater than the number. The integer 12 is the first abundant number: its proper divisors are 1, 2, 3, 4 and 6, and their sum 16 is larger than 12. The amount by which the sum exceeds the number is the abundance. The number 12 has an abundance of 4, for example.

== Definition and examples ==
An abundant number is a natural number n for which the sum of divisors σ(n) satisfies σ(n) > 2n, or, equivalently, the sum of proper divisors (or aliquot sum) s(n) satisfies s(n) > n. The abundance of a natural number is the integer σ(n) − 2n (equivalently, s(n) − n).

The abundant numbers smaller than 100 are

12, 18, 20, 24, 30, 36, 40, 42, 48, 54, 56, 60, 66, 70, 72, 78, 80, 84, 88, 90, and 96 (sequence A005101 in the OEIS).

For example, the proper divisors of 24 are 1, 2, 3, 4, 6, 8, and 12, whose sum is 36. Because 36 is greater than 24, the number 24 is abundant, and its abundance is 36 − 24 = 12.

Numbers that are not abundant are either perfect (if σ(n) = 2n) or deficient (if σ(n) < 2n).

== Properties ==
Let $a(n)$ be the number of abundant numbers not exceeding $n$. Plot of $a(n)/n$ for $n < 10^6$ (with $n$ log-scaled)

Every multiple of an abundant number is abundant. For example, every multiple of 20 (including 20 itself) is abundant because if n is a multiple of 20 then $\sigma(n) \geq \tfrac{n}{2} + \tfrac{n}{4} + \tfrac{n}{5} + \tfrac{n}{10} + \tfrac{n}{20} = n + \tfrac{n}{10}.$ Similarly, every multiple of a perfect number (except the perfect number itself) is abundant. For example, every multiple n of 6 greater than 6 is abundant because $\sigma(n) \geq 1 + \tfrac{n}{2} + \tfrac{n}{3} + \tfrac{n}{6} = n + 1.$ An abundant number that is not the multiple of an abundant number or perfect number (i.e., whose proper divisors are all deficient) is called a primitive abundant number.

Unlike for perfect numbers, even and odd abundant numbers are known to exist. The smallest odd abundant number is 945. Consequently, infinitely many abundant numbers exist with each parity. The smallest abundant number that is not divisible by 2 or by 3 is 5391411025; its distinct prime factors are 5, 7, 11, 13, 17, 19, 23, and 29. An algorithm given by Iannucci in 2005 shows how to find the smallest abundant number not divisible by the first k primes (sequence A047802 in the OEIS). If $A(k)$ represents the smallest abundant number not divisible by the first k primes then for all $\epsilon>0$ we have
$$(1-\epsilon)(k\ln k)^{2-\epsilon}<\ln A(k)<(1+\epsilon)(k\ln k)^{2+\epsilon}$$
for sufficiently large k.

The set of abundant numbers has a non-zero natural density: that is, as N grows large, the fraction of the natural numbers less than N that are abundant approaches a constant. This limiting fraction lies between 0.2476171 and 0.2476475.

The first pair of consecutive abundant numbers is (5775, 5776), and the first consecutive triple is (171078830, 171078831, 171078832). Let $E(n)$ be the length of the longest run of consecutive abundant numbers not exceeding $n$. Paul Erdős (1935) showed that there exists two constants $c_1, c_2$ such that $c_1\log\log\log n \le E(n) \le c_2\log\log\log n$ for all sufficiently large $n$. As a matter of fact, the limit
$$\lim_{n\to\infty}\dfrac{E(n)}{\log\log\log n}$$
exists, with value lying between 3.24 and 3.54.

Every integer greater than 20161 can be written as the sum of two abundant numbers. The largest even number that is not the sum of two abundant numbers is 46.

== Related concepts ==
Euler diagram of numbers under 100: Abundant Primitive abundant Highly abundant Superabundant and highly composite Colossally abundant and superior highly composite Weird Perfect Composite Deficient

Numbers whose sum of proper factors equals the number itself (such as 6 and 28) are called perfect numbers, while numbers whose sum of proper factors is less than the number itself are called deficient numbers. The first known classification of numbers as deficient, perfect or abundant was by Nicomachus in his Introductio Arithmetica (ca. 100 CE) and by Theon of Smyrna in his On Mathematics Useful for the Understanding of Plato (ca. 100 CE).

The abundancy index of n is the ratio σ(n)/n. A number whose abundancy index is greater than any lower number is called a superabundant number (sequence A004394 in the OEIS). Distinct numbers n_{1}, n_{2}, ... (whether abundant or not) with the same abundancy index are called friendly numbers.

The sequence (a_{k}) of least numbers n such that σ(n) > kn, in which a_{2} = 12 corresponds to the first abundant number, grows very quickly (sequence A134716 in the OEIS). The smallest odd integer with abundancy index exceeding 3 is 1018976683725 = 3^{3} × 5^{2} × 7^{2} × 11 × 13 × 17 × 19 × 23 × 29.

If p = (p_{1}, ..., p_{n}) is a list of primes, then p is termed abundant if some integer composed only of primes in p is abundant. A necessary and sufficient condition for this is that the product of the numbers $\frac{p_k}{p_k - 1}$ be larger than 2.

A number n for which the sum of its divisors (including itself) is greater than the sum of the divisors of any smaller natural number is called a highly abundant number.

An abundant number which is not a semiperfect number is called a weird number. An abundant number with abundance 1 is called a quasiperfect number; it is not known whether any quasiperfect numbers exist.
