= Perfect number =

Number equal to the sum of its proper divisors

Illustration of the perfect number status of the number 6

In number theory, a perfect number is a positive integer that is equal to the sum of its positive proper divisors, that is, divisors excluding the number itself. For instance, 6 has proper divisors 1, 2, and 3, and 1 + 2 + 3 = 6, so 6 is a perfect number. The next perfect number is 28, because 28 has proper divisors 1, 2, 4, 7, 14, and 1 + 2 + 4 + 7 + 14 = 28.

The first seven perfect numbers are 6, 28, 496, 8128, 33550336, 8589869056, and 137438691328 (sequence A000396 in the OEIS).

The sum of proper divisors of a number is called its aliquot sum, so a perfect number is one that is equal to its aliquot sum. Equivalently, a perfect number is a number that is half the sum of all of its positive divisors; in symbols, $\sigma_1(n)=2n$ where $\sigma_1$ is the sum-of-divisors function.

This definition is ancient, appearing as early as Euclid's Elements (Book VII, Definition 22) where it is called τέλειος ἀριθμός (téleios arithmós; 'perfect', 'ideal', or 'complete number'). Euclid also proved a formation rule (Book IX, Proposition 36) whereby $\frac {q(q+1)}{2}$ is an even perfect number whenever $q$ is a prime of the form $2^p-1$ for positive integer $p$—what is now called a Mersenne prime. (Note: In this case, it turns out that the exponent p must also be prime.) Two millennia later, Leonhard Euler proved that all even perfect numbers are of this form. This is known as the Euclid–Euler theorem.

It is not known whether there are any odd perfect numbers, nor whether infinitely many perfect numbers exist.

== History ==
In about 300 BC Euclid showed that if $2^p-1$ is prime then $2^{p-1}(2^p-1)$ is perfect. The first four perfect numbers were the only ones known to early Greek mathematics, and the mathematician Nicomachus noted 8128 as early as around AD 100. In modern language, Nicomachus states without proof that every perfect number is of the form $2^{n-1}(2^n-1)$ where $2^n-1$ is prime. He seems to be unaware that n itself has to be prime. He also says (wrongly) that the perfect numbers end in 6 or 8 alternately (the first five perfect numbers end with digits 6, 8, 6, 8, 6; but the sixth also ends in 6). Philo of Alexandria in his first-century book "On the creation" mentions perfect numbers, claiming that the world was created in 6 days and the moon orbits in 28 days because 6 and 28 are perfect. Philo is followed by Origen, and by Didymus the Blind, who adds the observation that there are only four perfect numbers that are less than 10,000. (Commentary on Genesis 1. 14–19). Augustine of Hippo defines perfect numbers in The City of God (Book XI, Chapter 30) in the early 5th century AD, repeating the claim that God created the world in 6 days because 6 is the smallest perfect number. The Egyptian mathematician Ismail ibn Fallūs (1194–1252) mentioned the next three perfect numbers (33,550,336; 8,589,869,056; and 137,438,691,328) and listed a few more which are now known to be incorrect. The first known European mention of the fifth perfect number is a manuscript written between 1456 and 1461 by an unknown mathematician. In 1588, the Italian mathematician Pietro Cataldi identified the sixth (8,589,869,056) and the seventh (137,438,691,328) perfect numbers, and also proved that every perfect number obtained from Euclid's rule ends with a 6 or an 8.

== Even perfect numbers ==
Unsolved problem in mathematics
Are there infinitely many perfect numbers?
More unsolved problems in mathematics

Euclid proved that $2^{p-1}(2^p-1)$ is an even perfect number whenever $2^p-1$ is prime in Elements (Book IX, Proposition 36).

For example, the first four perfect numbers are generated by the formula $2^{p-1}(2^p-1)$, with p a prime number, as follows:
$$\begin{align}
p = 2 &: \quad 2^1(2^2 - 1) = 2 \times 3 = 6 \\
p = 3 &: \quad 2^2(2^3 - 1) = 4 \times 7 = 28 \\
p = 5 &: \quad 2^4(2^5 - 1) = 16 \times 31 = 496 \\
p = 7 &: \quad  2^6(2^7 - 1) = 64 \times 127 = 8128.
\end{align}$$

Prime numbers of the form $2^p-1$ are known as Mersenne primes, after the seventeenth-century monk Marin Mersenne, who studied number theory and perfect numbers. For $2^p-1$ to be prime, it is necessary that p itself be prime. However, not all numbers of the form $2^p-1$ with a prime p are prime; for example, $2^{11} - 1 = 2047 = 23 \times 89$ is not a prime number. (Note: All factors of $2^p-1$ are congruent to $1 \pmod{2p}$. For example, $2^11 - 1 = 2047 = 23 \times 89$, and both 23 and 89 yield a remainder of 1 when divided by 22. Furthermore, whenever $p$ is a Sophie Germain prime—that is, $2p+1$ is also prime—and $2p+1$ is congruent to $1 \pmod{8}$ or $7 \pmod{8}$, then $2p+1$ will be a factor of $2^p-1$, which is the case for $p = 11, 23, 83, 131, 179, 191, 239, \ldots$ (OEIS: A002515).) In fact, Mersenne primes are very rare: of the approximately 4 million primes p up to 68,874,199, $2^p-1$ is prime for only 48 of them.

While Nicomachus had stated (without proof) that all perfect numbers were of the form $2^{n-1}(2^n-1)$ where $2^n-1$ is prime (though he stated this somewhat differently), Ibn al-Haytham (Alhazen) circa AD 1000 was unwilling to go that far, declaring instead (also without proof) that the formula yielded only every even perfect number. It was not until the 18th century that Leonhard Euler proved that the formula $2^{p-1}(2^p-1)$ indeed yields all the even perfect numbers. Thus, there is a one-to-one correspondence between even perfect numbers and Mersenne primes; each Mersenne prime q generates one even perfect number q(q + 1)/2, and vice versa. This result is often referred to as the Euclid–Euler theorem.

An exhaustive search by the GIMPS distributed computing project has shown that the first 51 even perfect numbers are $2^{p-1}(2^p-1)$ for

p = 2, 3, 5, 7, 13, 17, 19, 31, 61, 89, 107, 127, 521, 607, 1279, 2203, 2281, 3217, 4253, 4423, 9689, 9941, 11213, 19937, 21701, 23209, 44497, 86243, 110503, 132049, 216091, 756839, 859433, 1257787, 1398269, 2976221, 3021377, 6972593, 13466917, 20996011, 24036583, 25964951, 30402457, 32582657, 37156667, 42643801, 43112609, 57885161, 74207281, 77232917, 82589933 OEIS: A000043.

One higher perfect number has also been discovered, namely that for which p = 136279841. Although it is still possible there may be others within this range, initial but exhaustive tests by GIMPS have revealed no other perfect numbers for p below 141561103. As of October 2024, 52 Mersenne primes are known, and therefore 52 even perfect numbers (the largest of which is $2^{136279840} \times (2^{136279841} - 1)$ with 82,048,640 digits). It is not known whether there are infinitely many perfect numbers, nor whether there are infinitely many Mersenne primes.

Proof without words that even perfect numbers are triangular

As 2^{n}−1 is odd, and all hexagonal numbers are odd-sided triangular numbers, they are also hexagonal

As well as having the form $2^{p-1}(2^p-1)$, each even perfect number is the $(2^p-1)$-th triangular number (and hence equal to the sum of the integers from 1 to $2^p-1$) and the $2^{p-1}$-th hexagonal number. Furthermore, each even perfect number except for 6 is the $\tfrac{2^p+1}{3}$-th centered nonagonal number and is equal to the sum of the first $2^\frac{p-1}{2}$ odd cubes (odd cubes up to the cube of $2^\frac{p+1}{2}-1$):

$$\begin{alignat}{3}
6 &= 2^1(2^2 - 1)  &&= 1 + 2 + 3, \\[8pt]
28 &= 2^2(2^3 - 1) &&= 1 + 2 + 3 + 4 + 5 + 6 + 7 \\
& &&= 1^3 + 3^3 \\[8pt]
496 &= 2^4(2^5 - 1) &&= 1 + 2 + 3 + \cdots + 29 + 30 + 31 \\
& &&= 1^3 + 3^3 + 5^3 + 7^3 \\[8pt]
8128 &= 2^6(2^7 - 1) &&= 1 + 2 + 3 + \cdots + 125 + 126 + 127 \\
& &&= 1^3 + 3^3 + 5^3 + 7^3 + 9^3 + 11^3 + 13^3 + 15^3 \\[8pt]
33550336 &= 2^{12}(2^{13} - 1) &&= 1 + 2 + 3 + \cdots + 8189 + 8190 + 8191 \\
& &&= 1^3 + 3^3 + 5^3 + \cdots + 123^3 + 125^3 + 127^3
\end{alignat}$$

Even perfect numbers (except 6) are of the form
$$T_{2^p - 1} = 1 + \frac{(2^p - 2) \times (2^p + 1)}{2} = 1 + 9 \times T_{(2^p - 2)/3}$$

with each resulting triangular number $T_7 = 28$, $T_{31} = 496$, $T_{127} = 8128$ (after subtracting 1 from the perfect number and dividing the result by 9) ending in 3 or 5, the sequence starting with $T_2 = 3$, $T_{10} = 55$, $T_{42} = 903$, $T_{2730} = 3727815$, et cetera. It follows that by adding the digits of any even perfect number (except 6), then adding the digits of the resulting number, and repeating this process until a single digit (called the digital root) is obtained, always produces the number 1. For example, the digital root of 8128 is 1, because $8 + 1 + 2 + 8 = 19$, $1 + 9 = 10$, and $1 + 0 = 1$. This works with all perfect numbers $2^{p-1}(2^p-1)$ with odd prime p and, in fact, with all numbers of the form $2^{m-1}(2^m-1)$ for odd integer (not necessarily prime) m.

Owing to their form, $2^{p-1}(2^p-1)$, every even perfect number is represented in binary form as p ones followed by p − 1 zeros; for example:

$$\begin{array}{rcl}
6_{10} =& 2^2 + 2^1 &= 110_2 \\
28_{10} =& 2^4 + 2^3 + 2^2 &= 11100_2 \\
496_{10} =& 2^8 + 2^7 + 2^6 + 2^5 + 2^4 &= 111110000_2 \\
8128_{10} =& \!\! 2^{12} + 2^{11} + 2^{10} + 2^9 + 2^8 + 2^7 + 2^6 \!\! &= 1111111000000_2
\end{array}$$

Thus every even perfect number is a pernicious number.

Every even perfect number is also a practical number.

== Odd perfect numbers ==
Unsolved problem in mathematics
Are there any odd perfect numbers?
More unsolved problems in mathematics

It is unknown whether any odd perfect numbers exist, though various results have been obtained. In 1496, Jacques Lefèvre stated that Euclid's rule gives all perfect numbers, thus implying that no odd perfect number exists, but Euler himself stated: "Whether ... there are any odd perfect numbers is a most difficult question". More recently, Carl Pomerance presented a heuristic argument suggesting that indeed no odd perfect number should exist. All perfect numbers are also harmonic divisor numbers, and it has been conjectured as well that there are no odd harmonic divisor numbers other than 1.

Any odd perfect number N must satisfy the following conditions:

- $N > 10^{1500}$.
- $N$ is not divisible by 105 i.e. $N \neq 0 \pmod{105}$.
- $N$ is of the form $N \equiv 1 \pmod{12}$ or $N \equiv 117 \pmod{468}$ or $N \equiv 81 \pmod{324}$.
- The largest prime power $p^a$ that divides $N$ is greater than $10^{62}$.
- The largest prime factor of $N$ is greater than $10^8$, and less than $\sqrt[3]{3N}$.
- The second largest prime factor of $N$ is greater than $10^4$, and less than $\sqrt[5]{2N}$.
- The third largest prime factor of $N$ is greater than 100, and less than $\sqrt[6]{2N}$.
- $N$ has at least 101 prime factors and at least 10 distinct prime factors. If 3 does not divide $N$, then $N$ has at least 12 distinct prime factors.
- $N$ is of the form $N=q^{\alpha} p_1^{2e_1} \cdots p_k^{2e_k}$, where:

- $q, p_1, \ldots, p_k$ are distinct odd primes (Euler);
- $q \equiv a \equiv 1 \pmod{4}$ (Euler);
- The smallest prime factor of $N$ is at most $\frac{k-1}{2}$;
- $N < 2^{(4^{k+1}-2^{k+1})}$;
- $\alpha + 2e_1 + 2e_2 + 2e_3 + \cdots + 2e_k \geq \frac{99k-224}{37}$;
- $qp_1p_2p_3 \cdots p_k < 2N^{\frac{17}{26} }$;
- $\frac{1}{q} + \frac{1}{p_1} + \frac{1}{p_2} + \cdots + \frac{1}{p_k} < \ln 2$;

From these results, we infer that if there is such an $N$ with 10 distinct prime factors, it must be in the range $2^{4982} < 10^{1500} < N < 2^{1048576} < 10^{315653}$.

Furthermore, several minor results are known about the exponents $e_1,\ldots,e_k$:

- Not all $e_i \equiv 1 \pmod3$.
- Not all $e_i \equiv 2 \pmod5$.
- If all $e_i \equiv 1 \pmod3$ or $e_i \equiv 2 \pmod5$, then the smallest prime factor of $N$ must lie between $10^8$ and $10^{1000}$.
- More generally, if all $2e_i+1$ have a prime factor in a given finite set $S$, then the smallest prime factor of $N$ must be smaller than an effectively computable constant depending only on $S$.
- If $(e_1,\ldots,e_k) = (1,\ldots,1,2,\ldots,2)$ with $t$ ones and $u$ twos, then $\frac {t-1}{4}\leq u \leq 2t+\sqrt{\alpha}$.
- $(e_1,\ldots,e_k) \neq (1,\ldots,1,3)$, $(1,\ldots,1,5)$, or $(1,\ldots,1,6)$.
- If e_{1} = ... = e_{k} = e, then
  - $e$ cannot be 3, 5, 24, 6, 8, 11, 14 or 18.
  - $k\leq 2e^2+8e+2$.

In 1888, Sylvester stated:

... a prolonged meditation on the subject has satisfied me that the existence of any one such [odd perfect number]—its escape, so to say, from the complex web of conditions which hem it in on all sides—would be little short of a miracle.

On the other hand, some odd integers come close to being perfect. René Descartes observed that the number D = 3^{2} ⋅ 7^{2} ⋅ 11^{2} ⋅ 13^{2} ⋅ 22021 = (3⋅1001)^{2} ⋅ (22⋅1001 − 1) = 198585576189 would be an odd perfect number if only 22021 (= 19^{2} ⋅ 61) were a prime number. The odd numbers with this property (they would be perfect if one of their composite factors were prime) are the Descartes numbers. Many of the properties proven about odd perfect numbers also apply to Descartes numbers, and Pace Nielsen has suggested that sufficient study of these numbers may lead to a proof that no odd perfect numbers exist.

== Minor results ==
- No Fibonacci number is also a perfect number.
- 28 is the only even perfect number that is a sum of two positive cubes of integers.
- The reciprocals of the divisors of a perfect number $N$ must add up to 2; that is, $\textstyle \sum_{d|n} d = 2n$ implies that $\textstyle \sum_{d|N} d/n = 2$. For example,
  - For 6, we have $\frac{1}{6}+\frac{1}{3}+\frac{1}{2}+\frac{1}{1} = \frac{1}{6}+\frac{2}{6}+\frac{3}{6}+\frac{6}{6} = \frac{1+2+3+6}{6} = \frac{2\cdot 6}{6} = 2$;
  - For 28, we have $\frac {1}{28}+ \frac{1}{14}+ \frac{1}{7}+ \frac {1}{4}+ \frac{1}{2}+ \frac {1}{1}= 2$, etc.
- The number of divisors of a perfect number (whether even or odd) must be even, because $N$ cannot be a perfect square.
  - From these two results it follows that every perfect number is an Ore's harmonic number.
- The even perfect numbers are not trapezoidal numbers; that is, they cannot be represented as the difference of two positive non-consecutive triangular numbers. There are only three types of non-trapezoidal numbers: even perfect numbers, powers of two, and the numbers of the form $2^{n-1}(2^n+1)$ formed as the product of a Fermat prime $2^n+1$ with a power of two in a similar way to the construction of even perfect numbers from Mersenne primes.
- The number of perfect numbers less than n is less than $c\sqrt{n}$, where c > 0 is a constant. In fact it is $o(\sqrt{n})$, using little-o notation.
- Every even perfect number ends in 6 or 28 in base ten and, with the only exception of 6, ends in 1 in base 9. Therefore, in particular the digital root of every even perfect number other than 6 is 1.
- The only square-free perfect number is 6.

== Related concepts ==
Euler diagram of numbers under 100: Abundant Primitive abundant Highly abundant Superabundant and highly composite Colossally abundant and superior highly composite Weird Perfect Composite Deficient

The sum of proper divisors gives various other kinds of numbers. Numbers where the sum is less than the number itself are called deficient, and where it is greater than the number, abundant. These terms, together with perfect itself, come from Greek numerology. A pair of numbers which are the sum of each other's proper divisors are called amicable, and larger cycles of numbers are called sociable. A positive integer such that every smaller positive integer is a sum of distinct divisors of it is a practical number.

By definition, a perfect number is a fixed point of the restricted divisor function $s(n) = \sigma(n) -n$, and the aliquot sequence associated with a perfect number is a constant sequence. All perfect numbers are also $\mathcal{S}$-perfect numbers, or Granville numbers.

A semiperfect number is a natural number that is equal to the sum of all or some of its proper divisors. A semiperfect number that is equal to the sum of all its proper divisors is a perfect number. Most abundant numbers are also semiperfect; abundant numbers which are not semiperfect are called weird numbers.

== See also ==
- Harmonic divisor number
- Hyperperfect number
- Leinster group
- List of Mersenne primes and perfect numbers
- Multiply perfect number
- Superperfect numbers
- Unitary perfect number
