= Divisor function =

Arithmetic function related to the divisors of an integer

Divisor function σ_{0}(n) up to n = 250

Sigma function σ_{1}(n) up to n = 250

Sum of the squares of divisors, σ_{2}(n), up to n = 250

Sum of cubes of divisors, σ_{3}(n) up to n = 250

In mathematics, and specifically in number theory, a divisor function is an arithmetic function related to the divisors of an integer. When referred to as the divisor function, it counts the number of divisors of an integer (including 1 and the number itself). It appears in a number of remarkable identities, including relationships on the Riemann zeta function and the Eisenstein series of modular forms. Divisor functions were studied by Ramanujan, who gave a number of important congruences and identities; these are treated separately in the article Ramanujan's sum.

A related function is the divisor summatory function, which, as the name implies, is a sum over the divisor function.

== Definition ==
The sum of positive divisors function σ_{z}(n), for a real or complex number z, is defined as the sum of the zth powers of the positive divisors of n. It can be expressed in sigma notation as

$$\sigma_z(n)=\sum_{d\mid n} d^z\,\! ,$$

where ${d\mid n}$ is shorthand for "d divides n". The notations d(n), ν(n) and τ(n) (for the German Teiler = divisors) are also used to denote σ_{0}(n), or the number-of-divisors function (OEIS: A000005). When z is 1, the function is called the sigma function or sum-of-divisors function, and the subscript is often omitted, so σ(n) is the same as σ_{1}(n) (OEIS: A000203).

The aliquot sum s(n) of n is the sum of the proper divisors (that is, the divisors excluding n itself, OEIS: A001065), and equals σ_{1}(n) − n; the aliquot sequence of n is formed by repeatedly applying the aliquot sum function.

== Example ==
For example, σ_{0}(12) is the number of the divisors of 12:

$$\begin{align}
\sigma_0(12) & = 1^0 + 2^0 + 3^0 + 4^0 + 6^0 + 12^0 \\
& = 1 + 1 + 1 + 1 + 1 + 1 = 6,
\end{align}$$

while σ_{1}(12) is the sum of all the divisors:

$$\begin{align}
\sigma_1(12) & = 1^1 + 2^1 + 3^1 + 4^1 + 6^1 + 12^1 \\
& = 1 + 2 + 3 + 4 + 6 + 12 = 28,
\end{align}$$

and the aliquot sum s(12) of proper divisors is:

$$\begin{align}
s(12) & = 1^1 + 2^1 + 3^1 + 4^1 + 6^1 \\
& = 1 + 2 + 3 + 4 + 6 = 16.
\end{align}$$

σ_{−1}(n) is sometimes called the abundancy index of n, and we have:

$$\begin{align}
\sigma_{-1}(12) & = 1^{-1} + 2^{-1} + 3^{-1} + 4^{-1} + 6^{-1} + 12^{-1} \\[6pt]
& = \tfrac11 + \tfrac12 + \tfrac13 + \tfrac14 + \tfrac16 + \tfrac1{12} \\[6pt]
& = \tfrac{12}{12} + \tfrac6{12} + \tfrac4{12} + \tfrac3{12} + \tfrac2{12} + \tfrac1{12} \\[6pt]
& = \tfrac{12 + 6 + 4 + 3 + 2 + 1}{12} = \tfrac{28}{12} = \tfrac73 = \tfrac{\sigma_1(12)}{12}
\end{align}$$

== Table of values ==
The cases x = 2 to 5 are listed in OEIS: A001157 through OEIS: A001160, x = 6 to 24 are listed in OEIS: A013954 through OEIS: A013972.

n	prime factorization	𝜎_{0}(n)	𝜎_{1}(n)	𝜎_{2}(n)	𝜎_{3}(n)	𝜎_{4}(n)
1	1	1	1	1	1	1
2	2	2	3	5	9	17
3	3	2	4	10	28	82
4	2^{2}	3	7	21	73	273
5	5	2	6	26	126	626
6	2×3	4	12	50	252	1394
7	7	2	8	50	344	2402
8	2^{3}	4	15	85	585	4369
9	3^{2}	3	13	91	757	6643
10	2×5	4	18	130	1134	10642
11	11	2	12	122	1332	14642
12	2^{2}×3	6	28	210	2044	22386
13	13	2	14	170	2198	28562
14	2×7	4	24	250	3096	40834
15	3×5	4	24	260	3528	51332
16	2^{4}	5	31	341	4681	69905
17	17	2	18	290	4914	83522
18	2×3^{2}	6	39	455	6813	112931
19	19	2	20	362	6860	130322
20	2^{2}×5	6	42	546	9198	170898
21	3×7	4	32	500	9632	196964
22	2×11	4	36	610	11988	248914
23	23	2	24	530	12168	279842
24	2^{3}×3	8	60	850	16380	358258
25	5^{2}	3	31	651	15751	391251
26	2×13	4	42	850	19782	485554
27	3^{3}	4	40	820	20440	538084
28	2^{2}×7	6	56	1050	25112	655746
29	29	2	30	842	24390	707282
30	2×3×5	8	72	1300	31752	872644
31	31	2	32	962	29792	923522
32	2^{5}	6	63	1365	37449	1118481
33	3×11	4	48	1220	37296	1200644
34	2×17	4	54	1450	44226	1419874
35	5×7	4	48	1300	43344	1503652
36	2^{2}×3^{2}	9	91	1911	55261	1813539
37	37	2	38	1370	50654	1874162
38	2×19	4	60	1810	61740	2215474
39	3×13	4	56	1700	61544	2342084
40	2^{3}×5	8	90	2210	73710	2734994
41	41	2	42	1682	68922	2825762
42	2×3×7	8	96	2500	86688	3348388
43	43	2	44	1850	79508	3418802
44	2^{2}×11	6	84	2562	97236	3997266
45	3^{2}×5	6	78	2366	95382	4158518
46	2×23	4	72	2650	109512	4757314
47	47	2	48	2210	103824	4879682
48	2^{4}×3	10	124	3410	131068	5732210
49	7^{2}	3	57	2451	117993	5767203
50	2×5^{2}	6	93	3255	141759	6651267

== Properties ==
=== Formulas at prime powers ===
For a prime number p,

$$\begin{align}
\sigma_0(p) & = 2 \\
\sigma_0(p^n) & = n+1 \\
\sigma_1(p) & = p+1
\end{align}$$

because by definition, the factors of a prime number are 1 and itself. Clearly, $1 < \sigma_0(n) < n$ for all $n > 2$, and $\sigma_x(n) > n$ for all $n > 1$, $x > 0$.

In general, since the divisors of a prime power $p^a$, with $a$ a natural number, are $1=p^0,p=p^1,p^2,\ldots,p^a$, then

$$\sigma_x(p^a)=1^x+p^x+p^{2x}+\ldots+p^{ax}$$

=== General formula ===
If $n = \prod_{i=1}^r p_i^{a_i}$, where r = ω(n) is the number of distinct prime factors of n, p_{i} is the ith prime factor, and a_{i} is the maximum power of p_{i} by which n is divisible, then we have:

$$\sigma_x(n) = \prod_{i=1}^r \sum_{j=0}^{a_i} p_i^{j x} = \prod_{i=1}^r \left (1 + p_i^x + p_i^{2x} + \cdots + p_i^{a_i x} \right ).$$

which, when x ≠ 0, is equivalent to:

$$\sigma_x(n) = \prod_{i=1}^{r} \frac{p_{i}^{(a_{i}+1)x}-1}{p_{i}^x-1}.$$

When x = 0, $\sigma_0(n)$ is:

$$\sigma_0(n)=\prod_{i=1}^r (a_i+1).$$

Proof: The proof is combinatorial in nature. Distributing (expanding) the product

$$\prod_{i=1}^r \left (1 + p_i^x + p_i^{2x} + \cdots + p_i^{a_i x} \right )$$

gives a sum in which each summand is a product. In the products there is one factor per parentheses, and each is one of the summands in the parentheses. Each such selection gives a different summand. Each such selection is equivalent to select, for each $i=1,2,\ldots,r$, a value $0\leq x_i\leq a_i$ which will represent selecting the summand $p_i^{x_ix}$ from the $i$-th parentheses. On the other hand, this is the same collection of choices needed to select a divisor of $n$, and write it as its prime factorization. This is because each divisor of $n$ can be written uniquely in the form $\prod_{i=1}^r p_i^{x_i}$, for $0\leq x_i\leq a_i$.

For example, the divisors of $24=2^3\cdot 3^1$ are $2^0\cdot 3^0, 2^0\cdot 3^1, 2^1\cdot 3^0, 2^1\cdot 3^1, 2^2\cdot 3^0, 2^2\cdot 3^1, 2^3\cdot 3^0, 2^3\cdot 3^1$. These are the same summands obtained when expanding

$$(2^0+2^1+2^2+2^3)(3^0+3^1)$$

A direct consequence of the formula is that the function $n\mapsto\sigma_x(n)$ is multiplicative. In fact, if $a,b$ are relatively prime, then they have prime factorizations $\prod_{i=1}^r p_i^{a_i}$ and $\prod_{i=r+1}^s p_i^{a_i}$ in which the set of primes $\{p_i\}_{i=1}^{r}$ and $\{p_i\}_{i=r+1}^s$ are disjoint. Then

$$\sigma_x(ab)=\prod_{i=1}^s \sum_{j=0}^{a_ix}p_i^{jx}=\prod_{i=1}^r \sum_{j=0}^{a_ix} p_i^{jx}\cdot\prod_{i=r+1}^s \sum_{j=0}^{a_ix} p_i^{jx}=\sigma_x(a)\sigma_x(b)$$

=== Other properties and identities ===
Euler proved the remarkable recurrence:

$$\begin{align}
\sigma_1(n) &= \sigma_1(n-1)+\sigma_1(n-2)-\sigma_1(n-5)-\sigma_1(n-7)+\sigma_1(n-12)+\sigma_1(n-15)+ \cdots \\[12mu]
&= \sum_{i\in\N} (-1)^{i+1}\left( \sigma_1 \left( n-\frac{1}{2} \left( 3i^2-i \right) \right) + \sigma_1 \left( n-\frac{1}{2} \left( 3i^2+i \right) \right) \right),
\end{align}$$

where $\sigma_1(0)=n$ if it occurs and $\sigma_1(x)=0$ for $x < 0$, and $\tfrac{1}{2} \left( 3i^2 \mp i \right)$ are consecutive pairs of generalized pentagonal numbers (OEIS: A001318, starting at offset 1). Indeed, Euler proved this by logarithmic differentiation of the identity in his pentagonal number theorem.

For a non-square integer, n, every divisor, d, of n is paired with divisor n/d of n and $\sigma_{0}(n)$ is even; for a square integer, one divisor (namely $\sqrt n$) is not paired with a distinct divisor and $\sigma_{0}(n)$ is odd. Similarly, the number $\sigma_{1}(n)$ is odd if and only if n is a square or twice a square.

We also note s(n) = σ(n) − n. Here s(n) denotes the sum of the proper divisors of n, that is, the divisors of n excluding n itself. This function is used to recognize perfect numbers, which are the n such that s(n) = n. If s(n) > n, then n is an abundant number, and if s(n) < n, then n is a deficient number.

If n is a power of 2, $n = 2^k$, then $\sigma(n) = 2 \cdot 2^k - 1 = 2n - 1$ and $s(n) = n - 1$, which makes n almost-perfect.

As an example, for two primes $p,q:p<q$, let

$$n = p\,q$$.

Then

$$\sigma(n)  = (p+1)(q+1) = n + 1 + (p+q),$$
$$\varphi(n) = (p-1)(q-1) = n + 1 - (p+q),$$

and

$$n + 1 = (\sigma(n) + \varphi(n))/2,$$
$$p + q = (\sigma(n) - \varphi(n))/2,$$

where $\varphi(n)$ is Euler's totient function.

Then, the roots of

$$(x-p)(x-q) = x^2 - (p+q)x + n = x^2 - [(\sigma(n) - \varphi(n))/2]x + [(\sigma(n) + \varphi(n))/2 - 1] = 0$$

express p and q in terms of σ(n) and φ(n) only, requiring no knowledge of n or $p+q$, as

$$p = (\sigma(n) - \varphi(n))/4 - \sqrt{[(\sigma(n) - \varphi(n))/4]^2 - [(\sigma(n) + \varphi(n))/2 - 1]},$$
$$q = (\sigma(n) - \varphi(n))/4 + \sqrt{[(\sigma(n) - \varphi(n))/4]^2 - [(\sigma(n) + \varphi(n))/2 - 1]}.$$

Also, knowing n and either $\sigma(n)$ or $\varphi(n)$, or, alternatively, $p+q$ and either $\sigma(n)$ or $\varphi(n)$ allows an easy recovery of p and q.

In 1984, Roger Heath-Brown proved that the equality

$$\sigma_0(n) = \sigma_0(n + 1)$$

is true for infinitely many values of n, see OEIS: A005237.

=== Dirichlet convolutions ===
By definition:
$$\sigma = \operatorname{Id} * \mathbf 1$$
By Möbius inversion:
$$\operatorname{Id} = \sigma * \mu$$

== Series relations ==
Two Dirichlet series involving the divisor function are:

$$\sum_{n=1}^\infty \frac{\sigma_{a}(n)}{n^s} = \zeta(s) \zeta(s-a)\quad\text{for}\quad \real(s)>1+\max\{\real(a),0\},$$

where $\zeta$ is the Riemann zeta function. The series for d(n) = σ_{0}(n) gives:

$$\sum_{n=1}^\infty \frac{d(n)}{n^s} = \zeta^2(s)\quad\text{for}\quad \real(s)>1,$$

and a Ramanujan identity

$$\sum_{n=1}^\infty \frac{\sigma_a(n)\sigma_b(n)}{n^s} = \frac{\zeta(s) \zeta(s-a) \zeta(s-b) \zeta(s-a-b)}{\zeta(2s-a-b)},$$

which is a special case of the Rankin–Selberg convolution.

A Lambert series involving the divisor function is:

$$\sum_{n=1}^\infty q^n \sigma_a(n) = \sum_{n=1}^\infty \sum_{j=1}^\infty n^a q^{j\,n} = \sum_{n=1}^\infty \frac{n^a q^n}{1-q^n} = \sum_{n=1}^\infty \operatorname{Li}_{-a}(q^n)$$

for arbitrary complex |q| ≤ 1 and a ($\operatorname{Li}$ is the polylogarithm). This summation also appears as the Fourier series of the Eisenstein series and the invariants of the Weierstrass elliptic functions.

For $k>0$, there is an explicit series representation with Ramanujan sums $c_m(n)$ as :

$$\sigma_k(n) = \zeta(k+1)n^k\sum_{m=1}^\infty \frac {c_m(n)}{m^{k+1}}.$$

The computation of the first terms of $c_m(n)$ shows its oscillations around the "average value" $\zeta(k+1)n^k$:

$$\sigma_k(n) = \zeta(k+1)n^k \left[ 1 + \frac{(-1)^n}{2^{k+1}} + \frac{2\cos\frac {2\pi n}{3}}{3^{k+1}} + \frac{2\cos\frac {\pi n}{2}}{4^{k+1}} + \cdots\right]$$

== Growth rate ==
In little-o notation, the divisor function satisfies the inequality:

$$\mbox{for all }\varepsilon>0,\quad d(n)=o(n^\varepsilon).$$

More precisely, Severin Wigert showed that:

$$\limsup_{n\to\infty}\frac{\log d(n)}{\log n/\log\log n}=\log2,$$

approached by $n$ taking the primorials since

$p_k\# = e^{(1 + o(1)) k \log k}.$

On the other hand, since there are infinitely many prime numbers,

$$\liminf_{n\to\infty} d(n)=2.$$

In Big-O notation, Peter Gustav Lejeune Dirichlet showed that the average order of the divisor function satisfies the following inequality:

$$\mbox{for all } x\geq1, \sum_{n\leq x}d(n)=x\log x+(2\gamma-1)x+O(\sqrt{x}),$$

where $\gamma$ is Euler's gamma constant. Improving the bound $O(\sqrt{x})$ in this formula is known as Dirichlet's divisor problem.

The behaviour of the sigma function is irregular. The asymptotic growth rate of the sigma function can be expressed by:

$$\limsup_{n\rightarrow\infty}\frac{\sigma(n)}{n\,\log \log n}=e^\gamma,$$

where lim sup is the limit superior. This result is Grönwall's theorem, published in 1913 (Grönwall 1913). His proof uses Mertens' third theorem, which says that:

$$\lim_{n\to\infty}\frac{1}{\log n}\prod_{p\le n}\frac{p}{p-1}=e^\gamma,$$

where p denotes a prime. Grönwall also showed that

$$\limsup_{n\rightarrow\infty}\frac{\sigma_a(n)}{n^a}=\zeta(a),\quad a>1,$$

where $\zeta$ is the Riemann zeta function.

In 1915, Ramanujan proved that under the assumption of the Riemann hypothesis, Robin's inequality

$\ \sigma(n) < e^\gamma n \log \log n$ (where γ is the Euler–Mascheroni constant)

holds for all sufficiently large n (Ramanujan 1997). The largest known value that violates the inequality is n=5040. In 1984, Guy Robin proved that the inequality is true for all n > 5040 if and only if the Riemann hypothesis is true (Robin 1984). This is Robin's theorem and the inequality became known after him. Robin furthermore showed that if the Riemann hypothesis is false then there are an infinite number of values of n that violate the inequality, and it is known that the smallest such n > 5040 must be superabundant (Akbary & Friggstad 2009). It has been shown that the inequality holds for large odd and square-free integers, and that the Riemann hypothesis is equivalent to the inequality just for n divisible by the fifth power of a prime (Choie et al. 2007).

Robin also proved, unconditionally, that the inequality:

$$\ \sigma(n) < e^\gamma n \log \log n + \frac{0.6483\ n}{\log \log n}$$

holds for all n ≥ 3.

A related bound was given by Jeffrey Lagarias in 2002, who proved that the Riemann hypothesis is equivalent to the statement that:

$$\sigma(n) < H_n + e^{H_n}\log(H_n)$$

for every natural number n > 1, where $H_n$ is the nth harmonic number, (Lagarias 2002).

== See also ==
- Divisor sum convolutions, lists a few identities involving the divisor functions
- Euler's totient function, Euler's phi function
- Refactorable number
- Table of divisors
- Unitary divisor
