= 286 (number) =

← 285	286	287 →
- ← 280 281 282 283 284 285 286 287 288 289 →: List of numbers; Integers; ← 0 100 200 300 400 500 600 700 800 900 →
- Cardinal: two hundred eighty-six
- Ordinal: 286th (two hundred eighty-sixth)
- Factorization: 2 × 11 × 13
- Divisors: 1, 2, 11, 13, 22, 26, 143, 286
- Greek numeral: ΣΠϚ´
- Roman numeral: CCLXXXVI, cclxxxvi
- Binary: 100011110_{2}
- Ternary: 101121_{3}
- Senary: 1154_{6}
- Octal: 436_{8}
- Duodecimal: 1BA_{12}
- Hexadecimal: 11E_{16}

286 is the natural number following 285 and preceding 287.

== In mathematics ==
- 286 is an even composite number with 3 prime factors.
- 286 is in the smallest pair of nontotient anagrams with 268.
- 286 is a tetrahedral number which means that represents a tetrahedron.
- 286 is a sphenic number which means that it has exactly 3 prime factors.
- 286 the first even pseudoprime to base 3.
