= Aliquot sequence =

Mathematical recursive sequence

Unsolved problem in mathematics
Do all aliquot sequences eventually end with a prime number, a perfect number, or a set of amicable or sociable numbers? (Catalan's aliquot sequence conjecture)
More unsolved problems in mathematics

In mathematics, an aliquot sequence is a sequence of positive integers in which each term is the sum of the proper divisors of the previous term. If the sequence reaches the number 1, it ends, since the sum of the proper divisors of 1 is 0.

== Definition and overview ==
The aliquot sequence starting with a positive integer k can be defined formally in terms of the sum-of-divisors function σ_{1} or the aliquot sum function s in the following way:
$$\begin{align}
s_0 &= k \\[4pt]
s_n &= s(s_{n-1}) = \sigma_1(s_{n-1}) - s_{n-1} \quad \text{if} \quad s_{n-1} > 0 \\[4pt]
s_n &= 0 \quad \text{if} \quad s_{n-1} = 0 \\[4pt]
s(0) &= \text{undefined}
\end{align}$$
If the s_{n − 1} = 0 condition is added, then the terms after 0 are all 0, and all aliquot sequences would be infinite, and we can conjecture that all aliquot sequences are either convergent (the limit of these sequences are usually 0 or 6) or eventually periodic.

For example, the aliquot sequence of 10 is 10, 8, 7, 1, 0 because:

$$\begin{align}
\sigma_1(10) -10 &= 5 + 2 + 1 = 8, \\[4pt]
\sigma_1(8) - 8 &= 4 + 2 + 1 = 7, \\[4pt]
\sigma_1(7) - 7 &= 1, \\[4pt]
\sigma_1(1) - 1 &= 0.
\end{align}$$

Many aliquot sequences terminate at zero; all such sequences necessarily end with a prime number followed by 1 (since the only proper divisor of a prime is 1), followed by 0 (since 1 has no proper divisors). See (sequence A080907 in the OEIS) for a list of such numbers up to 75. There are a variety of ways in which an aliquot sequence might not terminate:

- A perfect number has a repeating aliquot sequence of period 1. The aliquot sequence of 6, for example, is 6, 6, 6, 6, ...
- An amicable number has a repeating aliquot sequence of period 2. For instance, the aliquot sequence of 220 is 220, 284, 220, 284, ...
- A sociable number has a repeating aliquot sequence of period 3 or greater. (Sometimes the term sociable number is used to encompass amicable numbers as well.) For instance, the aliquot sequence of 1264460 is 1264460, 1547860, 1727636, 1305184, 1264460, ...
- Some numbers have an aliquot sequence which is eventually periodic, but the number itself is not perfect, amicable, or sociable. For instance, the aliquot sequence of 95 is 95, 25, 6, 6, 6, 6, ... Numbers like 95 that are not perfect, but have an eventually repeating aliquot sequence of period 1 are called aspiring numbers.

Aliquot sequences from 0 to 47
n	Aliquot sequence of n	Length ((sequence A098007 in the OEIS))
0	0	1
1	1, 0	2
2	2, 1, 0	3
3	3, 1, 0	3
4	4, 3, 1, 0	4
5	5, 1, 0	3
6	6	1
7	7, 1, 0	3
8	8, 7, 1, 0	4
9	9, 4, 3, 1, 0	5
10	10, 8, 7, 1, 0	5
11	11, 1, 0	3
12	12, 16, 15, 9, 4, 3, 1, 0	8
13	13, 1, 0	3
14	14, 10, 8, 7, 1, 0	6
15	15, 9, 4, 3, 1, 0	6
16	16, 15, 9, 4, 3, 1, 0	7
17	17, 1, 0	3
18	18, 21, 11, 1, 0	5
19	19, 1, 0	3
20	20, 22, 14, 10, 8, 7, 1, 0	8
21	21, 11, 1, 0	4
22	22, 14, 10, 8, 7, 1, 0	7
23	23, 1, 0	3
24	24, 36, 55, 17, 1, 0	6
25	25, 6	2
26	26, 16, 15, 9, 4, 3, 1, 0	8
27	27, 13, 1, 0	4
28	28	1
29	29, 1, 0	3
30	30, 42, 54, 66, 78, 90, 144, 259, 45, 33, 15, 9, 4, 3, 1, 0	16
31	31, 1, 0	3
32	32, 31, 1, 0	4
33	33, 15, 9, 4, 3, 1, 0	7
34	34, 20, 22, 14, 10, 8, 7, 1, 0	9
35	35, 13, 1, 0	4
36	36, 55, 17, 1, 0	5
37	37, 1, 0	3
38	38, 22, 14, 10, 8, 7, 1, 0	8
39	39, 17, 1, 0	4
40	40, 50, 43, 1, 0	5
41	41, 1, 0	3
42	42, 54, 66, 78, 90, 144, 259, 45, 33, 15, 9, 4, 3, 1, 0	15
43	43, 1, 0	3
44	44, 40, 50, 43, 1, 0	6
45	45, 33, 15, 9, 4, 3, 1, 0	8
46	46, 26, 16, 15, 9, 4, 3, 1, 0	9
47	47, 1, 0	3

The lengths of the aliquot sequences that start at n are:

1, 2, 2, 3, 2, 1, 2, 3, 4, 4, 2, 7, 2, 5, 5, 6, 2, 4, 2, 7, 3, 6, 2, 5, 1, 7, 3, 1, 2, 15, 2, 3, 6, 8, 3, 4, 2, 7, 3, 4, 2, 14, 2, 5, 7, 8, 2, 6, 4, 3, ... (sequence A044050 in the OEIS)

The final terms (excluding 1) of the aliquot sequences that start at n are:

1, 2, 3, 3, 5, 6, 7, 7, 3, 7, 11, 3, 13, 7, 3, 3, 17, 11, 19, 7, 11, 7, 23, 17, 6, 3, 13, 28, 29, 3, 31, 31, 3, 7, 13, 17, 37, 7, 17, 43, 41, 3, 43, 43, 3, 3, 47, 41, 7, 43, ... (sequence A115350 in the OEIS)

Numbers whose aliquot sequence terminates in 1 are:

1, 2, 3, 4, 5, 7, 8, 9, 10, 11, 12, 13, 14, 15, 16, 17, 18, 19, 20, 21, 22, 23, 24, 26, 27, 29, 30, 31, 32, 33, 34, 35, 36, 37, 38, 39, 40, 41, 42, 43, 44, 45, 46, 47, 48, 49, 50, ... (sequence A080907 in the OEIS)

Numbers whose aliquot sequence does not terminate in 1 are:

6, 25, 28, 95, 119, 143, 220, 276?, 284, 306?, 396?, 417, 445, 496, ... (sequence A126016 in the OEIS)

Numbers whose aliquot sequence is known to terminate in a perfect number, other than perfect numbers themselves (6, 28, 496, ...), are:

25, 95, 119, 143, 417, 445, 565, 608, 650, 652, 675, 685, 783, 790, 909, 913, ... (sequence A063769 in the OEIS)

Numbers whose aliquot sequence terminates in a cycle with length at least 2 are:

220, 284, 562, 1064, 1184, 1188, 1210, 1308, 1336, 1380, 1420, 1490, 1604, 1690, 1692, 1772, 1816, 1898, 2008, 2122, 2152, 2172, 2362, ... (sequence A121507 in the OEIS)

Numbers whose aliquot sequence is not known to be finite or eventually periodic are:

276, 306, 396, 552, 564, 660, 696, 780, 828, 888, 966, 996, 1074, 1086, 1098, 1104, 1134, 1218, 1302, 1314, 1320, 1338, 1350, 1356, 1392, 1398, 1410, 1464, 1476, 1488, ... (sequence A131884 in the OEIS)

A number that is never the successor in an aliquot sequence is called an untouchable number.

2, 5, 52, 88, 96, 120, 124, 146, 162, 188, 206, 210, 216, 238, 246, 248, 262, 268, 276, 288, 290, 292, 304, 306, 322, 324, 326, 336, 342, 372, 406, 408, 426, 430, 448, 472, 474, 498, ... (sequence A005114 in the OEIS)

== Catalan–Dickson conjecture ==
An important conjecture due to Catalan, sometimes called the Catalan–Dickson conjecture, is that every aliquot sequence ends in one of the above ways: with a prime number, a perfect number, or a set of amicable or sociable numbers. The alternative would be that a number exists whose aliquot sequence is infinite yet never repeats. Any one of the many numbers whose aliquot sequences have not been fully determined might be such a number. The first five candidate numbers are often called the Lehmer five (named after D.H. Lehmer): 276, 552, 564, 660, and 966. While 276 may or may not reach a high apex in its aliquot sequence and then descend, the number 138 is notable for reaching a peak of 179,931,895,322 before returning to 1.

In their lifetimes, Guy and Selfridge believed the Catalan–Dickson conjecture to be false: they conjecture some aliquot sequences are unbounded above (i.e., diverge).

== Systematically searching for aliquot sequences ==
The aliquot sequence can be represented as a directed graph, $G_{n,s}$, for a given integer $n$, where $s(k)$ denotes the sum of the proper divisors of $k$. Cycles in $G_{n,s}$ represent sociable numbers within the interval $[1,n]$. Two special cases are loops that represent perfect numbers and cycles of length two that represent amicable pairs.

== See also ==
- Arithmetic dynamics
