= 294 (number) =

| ← 293 | 294 | 295 → |
- ← 290 291 292 293 294 295 296 297 298 299 →: List of numbers; Integers; ← 0 100 200 300 400 500 600 700 800 900 →
- Cardinal: two hundred ninety-four
- Ordinal: 294th (two hundred ninety-fourth)
- Factorization: 2 × 3 × 7^{2}
- Divisors: 1, 2, 3, 6, 7,14, 21, 42, 49, 98, 147, 294
- Greek numeral: ΣϞΔ´
- Roman numeral: CCXCIV, ccxciv
- Binary: 100100110_{2}
- Ternary: 101220_{3}
- Senary: 1210_{6}
- Octal: 446_{8}
- Duodecimal: 206_{12}
- Hexadecimal: 126_{16}

294 is the natural number following 293 and preceding 295.

== In mathematics ==
- 294 is an even composite number with three prime factors.
- 294 is the number of planar biconnected graphs with 7 vertices. Biconnected graphs are two dimensional graphs with a given number of points and 294 is the number of ways to organize 7 vertices in different ways.
- 11115² - 294² = 123456789
- The Magic Inscribed Lotus was created by Nārāyaṇa, and Indian Mathematician in the 14th century. In this inscription, each group of 12 numbers has a sum of 294. It was constructed with a 12 x 4 magic rectangle.
- In 1930, George A. Miller determined that there are 294 groups of order 64 up to isomorphism. This was later disproven; there are 267 groups of order of 64 up to isomorphism. See List of incomplete proofs.
