= 295 (number) =

← 294	295	296 →
- ← 290 291 292 293 294 295 296 297 298 299 →: List of numbers; Integers; ← 0 100 200 300 400 500 600 700 800 900 →
- Cardinal: two hundred ninety-five
- Ordinal: 295th (two hundred ninety-fifth)
- Factorization: 5 × 59
- Divisors: 1, 5, 59, 295
- Greek numeral: ΣϞΕ´
- Roman numeral: CCXCV, ccxcv
- Binary: 100100111_{2}
- Ternary: 101221_{3}
- Senary: 1211_{6}
- Octal: 447_{8}
- Duodecimal: 207_{12}
- Hexadecimal: 127_{16}

295 is the natural number following 294 and preceding 296.

== In mathematics ==
- 295 is an odd composite number with two prime factors.
- 295 is a centered tetrahedral number meaning that it can be represented as a tetrahedron.
- 295 is a structured deltoidal hexecontahedral number which can be represented as a deltoidal hexecontahedron.
- 295 can be written as the sum of 4 nonzero perfect squares.
- 295 is the second suspected Lychrel number.
