= 281 (number) =

← 280	281	282 →
- ← 280 281 282 283 284 285 286 287 288 289 →: List of numbers; Integers; ← 0 100 200 300 400 500 600 700 800 900 →
- Cardinal: two hundred eighty-one
- Ordinal: 281st (two hundred eighty-first)
- Factorization: prime
- Prime: 60th
- Greek numeral: ΣΠΑ´
- Roman numeral: CCLXXXI, cclxxxi
- Binary: 100011001_{2}
- Ternary: 101102_{3}
- Senary: 1145_{6}
- Octal: 431_{8}
- Duodecimal: 1B5_{12}
- Hexadecimal: 119_{16}

281 is the natural number following 280 and preceding 282. It is also a 60th prime number.

== In mathematics ==
281 is a twin prime with 283, Sophie Germain prime, sum of the first fourteen primes, sum of seven consecutive primes (29 + 31 + 37 + 41 + 43 + 47 + 53), Chen prime, Eisenstein prime with no imaginary part, and a centered decagonal number.

281 is the smallest prime p such that the decimal period length of the reciprocal of p is (p−1)/10, i.e. the period length of 1/281 is 28. However, in binary, it has period length 70.

The generalized repunit number $\frac{281^p-1}{280}$ is composite for all prime p < 60000.
