= 273 (number) =

← 272	273	274 →
- ← 270 271 272 273 274 275 276 277 278 279 →: List of numbers; Integers; ← 0 100 200 300 400 500 600 700 800 900 →
- Cardinal: two hundred seventy-three
- Ordinal: 273rd (two hundred seventy-third)
- Factorization: 3 × 7 × 13
- Divisors: 1, 3, 7, 13, 21, 39, 91, 273
- Greek numeral: ΣΟΓ´
- Roman numeral: CCLXXIII, cclxxiii
- Binary: 100010001_{2}
- Ternary: 101010_{3}
- Senary: 1133_{6}
- Octal: 421_{8}
- Duodecimal: 1A9_{12}
- Hexadecimal: 111_{16}

273 (two hundred [and] seventy-three) is the natural number following 272 and preceding 274.

== In mathematics ==
273 is a sphenic number, being the product of three distinct primes: 3 × 7 × 13. It is also a lucky number, a truncated triangular pyramid number, and an idoneal number.

There are 273 different ternary trees with five nodes. It is in the Moser–de Bruijn sequence, comprising the sum 4^{4} + 4^{2} + 4^{0} = 256 + 16 + 1, and is a central polygonal number.

273 is a deficient number, as the sum of its proper divisors (175) is less than itself.

== In science ==
The number 273 has particular significance in temperature measurement. Absolute zero, the lowest possible temperature, is −273.15 °C (0.00 K; −459.67 °F), often rounded to −273 °C. Correspondingly, the freezing point of water at standard pressure is approximately 273 K (273.15 K exactly).

This relationship arises from Charles's law, which determined that at constant pressure, ideal gases expand or contract their volume by about 1/273 per degree Celsius of temperature change.

== In astronomy ==
- 273 Atropos is a main-belt asteroid discovered by Austrian astronomer Johann Palisa on 8 March 1888 in Vienna. It is named after Atropos, one of the Three Fates in Greek mythology.
- NGC 273 is an edge-on lenticular galaxy in the constellation Cetus, discovered on 10 September 1785 by William Herschel.
