= 282 (number) =

← 281	282	283 →
- ← 280 281 282 283 284 285 286 287 288 289 →: List of numbers; Integers; ← 0 100 200 300 400 500 600 700 800 900 →
- Cardinal: two hundred eighty-two
- Ordinal: 282nd (two hundred eighty-second)
- Factorization: 2 × 3 × 47
- Divisors: 1, 2, 3, 6, 47, 94, 141, 282
- Greek numeral: ΣΠΒ´
- Roman numeral: CCLXXXII, cclxxxii
- Binary: 100011010_{2}
- Ternary: 101110_{3}
- Senary: 1150_{6}
- Octal: 432_{8}
- Duodecimal: 1B6_{12}
- Hexadecimal: 11A_{16}

282 (two hundred [and] eighty-two) is the natural number following 281 and preceding 283.

== In mathematics ==
- 282 is an even composite number with three prime factors.
- 282 is a palindromic number. This is a number that is the same backwards as it is forwards. 282 is the smallest multi-digit palindromic number that is between twin primes, numbers that are prime and are 2 away from another prime number.
- 282 is equal to the sum of its divisors containing the number 4. It is the sum of 47 + 94 + 141.
- 282 is the number of planar partitions of 9. This means that 282 is the number of ways to separate 9 units.
