= 271 (number) =

← 270	271	272 →
- ← 270 271 272 273 274 275 276 277 278 279 →: List of numbers; Integers; ← 0 100 200 300 400 500 600 700 800 900 →
- Cardinal: two hundred seventy-one
- Ordinal: 271st (two hundred seventy-first)
- Factorization: prime
- Prime: yes
- Greek numeral: ΣΟΑ´
- Roman numeral: CCLXXI, cclxxi
- Binary: 100001111_{2}
- Ternary: 101001_{3}
- Senary: 1131_{6}
- Octal: 417_{8}
- Duodecimal: 1A7_{12}
- Hexadecimal: 10F_{16}

271 (two hundred [and] seventy-one) is the natural number after 270 and before 272.

== Properties ==
271 is a twin prime with 269, a cuban prime (a prime number that is the difference of two consecutive cubes), and a centered hexagonal number. It is the smallest prime number bracketed on both sides by numbers divisible by cubes, and the smallest prime number bracketed by numbers with five primes (counting repetitions) in their factorizations:

$270=2\cdot 3^3\cdot 5$ and $272=2^4\cdot 17$.

After 7, 271 is the second-smallest Eisenstein–Mersenne prime, one of the analogues of the Mersenne primes in the Eisenstein integers.

271 is the largest prime factor of the five-digit repunit 11111, and the largest prime number for which the decimal period of its multiplicative inverse is 5:

$$\frac{1}{271}=0.00369003690036900369\ldots$$

It is a sexy prime with 277.
