= 293 (number) =

← 292	293	294 →
- ← 290 291 292 293 294 295 296 297 298 299 →: List of numbers; Integers; ← 0 100 200 300 400 500 600 700 800 900 →
- Cardinal: two hundred ninety-three
- Ordinal: 293rd (two hundred ninety-third)
- Factorization: prime
- Divisors: 1, 293
- Greek numeral: ΣϞΓ´
- Roman numeral: CCXCIII, ccxciii
- Binary: 100100101_{2}
- Ternary: 101212_{3}
- Senary: 1205_{6}
- Octal: 445_{8}
- Duodecimal: 205_{12}
- Hexadecimal: 125_{16}

293 is the natural number following 292 and preceding 294.

== In mathematics ==
293 is:

- a prime number,
- a Pythagorean prime,
- a Sophie Germain prime
- a Chen prime
- a Happy number
- strictly trivially polygonal (number n that is polygonal in only 2 ways: 2-gonal and n-gonal)
- equivalent to the sum of the first three tetradic primes. Tetradic numbers are numbers that are the same if written backwards, flipped upside-down, or mirrored upside-down and tetradic primes are tetradic numbers that are also prime. It is the sum of 11 + 101 + 181.
- the sum of perfect cubes 2^{3}+2^{3}+3^{3}+5^{3}+5^{3}
