= 272 (number) =

← 271	272	273 →
- ← 270 271 272 273 274 275 276 277 278 279 →: List of numbers; Integers; ← 0 100 200 300 400 500 600 700 800 900 →
- Cardinal: two hundred seventy-two
- Ordinal: 272nd (two hundred seventy-second)
- Factorization: 2^{4} × 17
- Prime: no
- Greek numeral: ΣΟΒ´
- Roman numeral: CCLXXII, cclxxii
- Binary: 100010000_{2}
- Ternary: 101002_{3}
- Senary: 1132_{6}
- Octal: 420_{8}
- Duodecimal: 1A8_{12}
- Hexadecimal: 110_{16}

272 (two hundred [and] seventy-two) is the natural number after 271 and before 273.

== Properties ==
272 is a composite number, with divisors 1, 2, 4, 8, 16, 17, 34, 68, 136, and 272.

It can be expressed as the sum of four consecutive prime numbers: 61, 67, 71, and 73.

It is a palindromic number in base 10.

It is a pronic number, as it is the product of 16 and 17.
