= 296 (number) =

← 295	296	297 →
- ← 290 291 292 293 294 295 296 297 298 299 →: List of numbers; Integers; ← 0 100 200 300 400 500 600 700 800 900 →
- Cardinal: two hundred ninety-six
- Ordinal: 296th (two hundred ninety-sixth)
- Factorization: 2^{3} × 37
- Divisors: 1, 2, 4, 8, 37, 74, 148, 296
- Greek numeral: ΣϞϚ´
- Roman numeral: CCXCVI, ccxcvi
- Binary: 100101000_{2}
- Ternary: 101222_{3}
- Senary: 1212_{6}
- Octal: 450_{8}
- Duodecimal: 208_{12}
- Hexadecimal: 128_{16}

296 is the natural number following 295 and preceding 297.

== In mathematics ==
- 296 is an even composite number with two prime factors.
- 296 is a refactorable number meaning that it is divisible by its number of divisors.
- 296 is a unique period in base 2.
- 296 is the number of regions formed by drawing the line segments connecting any two of the 12 outer points in a 2 by 4 grid.
- 296 is the number of surface points on an 8^{3} cube.
