= 276 (number) =

| ← 275 | 276 | 277 → |
- ← 270 271 272 273 274 275 276 277 278 279 →: List of numbers; Integers; ← 0 100 200 300 400 500 600 700 800 900 →
- Cardinal: two hundred seventy-six
- Ordinal: 276th (two hundred seventy-sixth)
- Factorization: 2^{2} × 3 × 23
- Greek numeral: ΣΟϚ´
- Roman numeral: CCLXXVI, cclxxvi
- Binary: 100010100_{2}
- Ternary: 101020_{3}
- Senary: 1140_{6}
- Octal: 424_{8}
- Duodecimal: 1B0_{12}
- Hexadecimal: 114_{16}

276 (two hundred [and] seventy-six) is the natural number following 275 and preceding 277.

== In mathematics ==
276 is the sum of 3 consecutive fifth powers (276 = 1^{5} + 2^{5} + 3^{5}). As a figurate number it is the 23rd triangular number, a hexagonal number, and a centered pentagonal number, the third number after 1 and 6 to have this combination of properties.

276 is the first triangular number that can be arrived at in three ways by adding pairs of triangular numbers together. This sequence, dubbed 'Triple Triangle-Pair Numbers' is the sequence of integers: 276, 406, 666, ...

276 is the size of the largest set of equiangular lines in 23 dimensions. The maximal set of such lines, derived from the Leech lattice, provides the highest dimension in which the "Gerzon bound" of $\binom{n+1}{2}$ is known to be attained; its symmetry group is the third Conway group, Co_{3}.

276 is the smallest number for which it is not known if the corresponding aliquot sequence either terminates or ends in a repeating cycle. 306 follows the same sequence as 276, since its aliquot sum is the same as 276.

== In biblical studies ==
276 is one of the five three-digit triangular numbers (along with 120, 153, 300 and 666) that are present in the New Testament (specifically, in the books of John and Acts and Revelation; 276 being mentioned in Acts 27). Menasgotz argues that it is significant that two of those five (276 along with 666) constitute the first and the third of the Triple Triangle-Pair Numbers.
