= 265 (number) =

← 264	265	266 →
- ← 260 261 262 263 264 265 266 267 268 269 →: List of numbers; Integers; ← 0 100 200 300 400 500 600 700 800 900 →
- Cardinal: two hundred sixty-five
- Ordinal: 265th (two hundred sixty-fifth)
- Factorization: 5 × 53
- Divisors: 1, 5, 53, 265
- Greek numeral: ΣΞΕ´
- Roman numeral: CCLXV, cclxv
- Binary: 100001001_{2}
- Ternary: 100211_{3}
- Senary: 1121_{6}
- Octal: 411_{8}
- Duodecimal: 1A1_{12}
- Hexadecimal: 109_{16}

265 (two hundred [and] sixty-five) is the natural number following 264 and preceding 266.

== In mathematics ==
- 265 is an odd composite number with two prime factors.
- 265's sum of its proper divisors is 59.
- 265 is the number of derangements possible with 6 digits. That means that it is equivalent to !6.
- The number 265 is associated with the geometric shape known as the Vesica Piscis. This is shown by having 2 circles overlap in a way that the circumference of each circle touches the center of the other. Archimedes estimated that the ratio of the height of this shape to the width was 265:153 or approximately √3.
- 265 is the 22nd Padovan number which is defined by the two equations P(0)=P(1)=P(2)=1 and P(n)=P(n-2)+P(n-3) similar to the Fibonacci sequence.
- 265 is the 7th number to be the hypotenuse for two separate Pythagorean Triples. The other two values would be 23 and 264 or 96 and 247.
- 265 is the sum of two sets of two perfect squares. Those being 11 and 12 or 16 and 3.
- 265 is palindromic in base 12 (1A1).
