= 299 (number) =

← 298	299	300 →
- ← 290 291 292 293 294 295 296 297 298 299 →: List of numbers; Integers; ← 0 100 200 300 400 500 600 700 800 900 →
- Cardinal: two hundred ninety-nine
- Ordinal: 299th (two hundred ninety-ninth)
- Factorization: 13 × 23
- Divisors: 1, 13, 23, 299
- Greek numeral: ΣϞΘ´
- Roman numeral: CCXCIX, ccxcix
- Binary: 100101011_{2}
- Ternary: 102002_{3}
- Senary: 1215_{6}
- Octal: 453_{8}
- Duodecimal: 20B_{12}
- Hexadecimal: 12B_{16}

299 is the natural number following 298 and preceding 300.

== In mathematics ==
- 299 is an odd composite number with two prime factors.
- 299 is a highly cototient number, meaning that it has more values for $x - \phi(x)$ equal to that number than any before it.
- 299 is a self number, meaning that it has 298 integer partitions.
- 299 is the twelfth cake number, the maximum number of pieces to get from 12 slices of a cake.
- 299 is a brilliant number meaning that it is the product of 2 primes with both having the same number of digits.
