= 278 (number) =

← 277	278	279 →
- ← 200 210 220 230 240 250 260 270 280 290 →: List of numbers; Integers; ← 0 100 200 300 400 500 600 700 800 900 →
- Cardinal: two hundred seventy-eight
- Ordinal: 278th (two hundred seventy-eighth)
- Factorization: 2 × 139
- Divisors: 1, 2, 139, 278
- Greek numeral: ΣΟΗ´
- Roman numeral: CCLXXVIII, cclxxviii
- Binary: 100010110_{2}
- Ternary: 101022_{3}
- Senary: 1142_{6}
- Octal: 426_{8}
- Duodecimal: 1B2_{12}
- Hexadecimal: 116_{16}

278 (two hundred [and] seventy-eight) is the natural number following 277 and preceding 279.

== In mathematics ==
- 278 is an even composite number with 2 prime factors.
- 278 is equal to Φ(30). It is the sum of the totient function.
- 278 is a nontotient number which means that it is an even number that doesn't follow Euler's totient function.
- 278 is the smallest semiprime number that has an anagram that is also semiprime. The other number is 287.

== See also ==
- List of highways numbered 278
