= 285 (number) =

| ← 284 | 285 | 286 → |
- ← 280 281 282 283 284 285 286 287 288 289 →: List of numbers; Integers; ← 0 100 200 300 400 500 600 700 800 900 →
- Cardinal: two hundred eighty-five
- Ordinal: 285th (two hundred eighty-fifth)
- Factorization: 3 × 5 × 19
- Divisors: 1, 3, 5, 15, 19, 57, 95, 285
- Greek numeral: ΣΠΕ´
- Roman numeral: CCLXXXV, cclxxxv
- Binary: 100011101_{2}
- Ternary: 101120_{3}
- Senary: 1153_{6}
- Octal: 435_{8}
- Duodecimal: 1B9_{12}
- Hexadecimal: 11D_{16}

285 is the natural number following 284 and preceding 286.

== In mathematics ==
- 285 is an odd composite number.
- 285 is the 9th square pyramidal number. That means it is the sum of a number of consecutive perfect squares starting with 1. For 285, it is the sum of all of the single digits' perfect squares.
- 285 is the number of variations possible with a binary rooted tree with 13 points. A binary rooted tree means that it always begins with 1 point that is rooted. From there, each point can branch in up to two directions.
- 285 is a sphenic number which means that it has three distinct prime factors.
- 285 is a Harshad number. That means that it is divisible by the sum of its digits. 285 is divisible by 15.
- 285 is a repdigit number in base 7. In base 7, 285 is 555.
- 285 is a visually symmetric number. If flipped horizontally (seen in a vertical mirror), these numbers are symmetrical.
