= 277 (number) =

| ← 276 | 277 | 278 → |
- ← 270 271 272 273 274 275 276 277 278 279 →: List of numbers; Integers; ← 0 100 200 300 400 500 600 700 800 900 →
- Cardinal: two hundred seventy-seven
- Ordinal: 277th (two hundred seventy-seventh)
- Factorization: prime
- Prime: yes
- Greek numeral: ΣΟΖ´
- Roman numeral: CCLXXVII, cclxxvii
- Binary: 100010101_{2}
- Ternary: 101021_{3}
- Senary: 1141_{6}
- Octal: 425_{8}
- Duodecimal: 1B1_{12}
- Hexadecimal: 115_{16}

277 (two hundred [and] seventy-seven) is the natural number following 276 and preceding 278.

== Mathematical properties ==
277 is the 59th prime number, and a regular prime. It is the smallest prime p such that the sum of the inverses of the primes up to p is greater than two. Since 59 is itself prime, 277 is a super-prime. 59 is also a super-prime (it is the 17th prime), as is 17 (the 7th prime). However, 7 is the fourth prime number, and 4 is not prime. Thus, 277 is a super-super-super-prime but not a super-super-super-super-prime. It is the largest prime factor of the Euclid number 510511 = 2 × 3 × 5 × 7 × 11 × 13 × 17 + 1.

As a member of the lazy caterer's sequence, 277 counts the maximum number of pieces obtained by slicing a pancake with 23 straight cuts. 277 is also a Perrin number, and as such counts the number of maximal independent sets in an icosagon. There are 277 ways to tile a 3 × 8 rectangle with integer-sided squares, and 277 degree-7 monic polynomials with integer coefficients and all roots in the unit disk. On an infinite chessboard, there are 277 squares that a knight can reach from a given starting position in exactly six moves.

277 appears as the numerator of the fifth term of the Taylor series for the secant function:

$$\sec x = 1 + \frac{1}{2} x^2 + \frac{5}{24} x^4 + \frac{61}{720} x^6 + \frac{277}{8064} x^8 + \cdots$$

Since no number added to the sum of its digits generates 277, it is a self number. The next prime self number is not reached until 367.
