= 283 (number) =

← 282	283	284 →
- ← 280 281 282 283 284 285 286 287 288 289 →: List of numbers; Integers; ← 0 100 200 300 400 500 600 700 800 900 →
- Cardinal: two hundred eighty-three
- Ordinal: 283rd (two hundred eighty-third)
- Factorization: prime
- Prime: 61st
- Divisors: 1, 283
- Greek numeral: ΣΠΓ´
- Roman numeral: CCLXXXIII, cclxxxiii
- Binary: 100011011_{2}
- Ternary: 101111_{3}
- Senary: 1151_{6}
- Octal: 433_{8}
- Duodecimal: 1B7_{12}
- Hexadecimal: 11B_{16}

283 is the natural number following 282 and preceding 284.

== In mathematics ==
- 283 is an odd prime number, a twin prime with 281, and a super prime, meaning that it is the nth prime where n is a prime number as well.
- 283 is a strictly non palindromic number. That means that between base 2 and base n−2, that number is never palindromic.
- 283 is a number such that 4^{283}−3^{283} is prime.
- 283 is equivalent to 2^{5}+8+3^{5}.
- 61st prime number
