= Cluster prime =

Type of prime number

In number theory, a cluster prime is a prime number p such that every even positive integer k ≤ p − 3 can be written as the difference between two prime numbers not exceeding p. For example, the number 23 is a cluster prime because 23 − 3 = 20, and every even integer from 2 to 20, inclusive, is the difference of at least one pair of prime numbers not exceeding 23:

p ≤ 23
5 − 3 = 2
7 − 3 = 4
11 − 5 = 6
11 − 3 = 8
13 − 3 = 10
17 − 5 = 12
17 − 3 = 14
19 − 3 = 16
23 − 5 = 18
23 − 3 = 20

On the other hand, 149 is not a cluster prime because 140 < 146, and there is no way to write 140 as the difference of two primes that are less than or equal to 149.

By convention, 2 is not considered to be a cluster prime. The first 23 odd primes (up to 89) are all cluster primes. The first few odd primes that are not cluster primes are

97, 127, 149, 191, 211, 223, 227, 229, ... (sequence A038133 in the OEIS)

Unsolved problem in mathematics
Are there infinitely many cluster primes?
More unsolved problems in mathematics

Paul Erdős asked if there are infinitely many cluster primes. It is not known if there are infinitely many cluster primes.

== Properties ==
- The prime gap preceding a cluster prime is always six or less. For any given prime number n, let $p_n$ denote the n-th prime number. If ${{p_{n} - p_{n - 1}}}$ ≥ 8, then $p_n$ − 9 cannot be expressed as the difference of two primes not exceeding $p_n$; thus, $p_n$ is not a cluster prime.
  - The converse is not true: the smallest non-cluster prime that is the greater of a pair of gap length six or less is 227, a gap of only four between 223 and 227. 229 is the first non-cluster prime that is the greater of a twin prime pair.
- The set of cluster primes is a small set. In 1999, Richard Blecksmith proved that the sum of the reciprocals of the cluster primes is finite.
- Blecksmith also proved an explicit upper bound on C(x), the number of cluster primes less than or equal to x. Specifically, for any positive integer m: $C(x) < {x \over ln(x)^m}$ for all sufficiently large x.
  - It follows from this that almost all prime numbers are absent from the set of cluster primes.
