= 287 (number) =

| ← 286 | 287 | 288 → |
- ← 280 281 282 283 284 285 286 287 288 289 →: List of numbers; Integers; ← 0 100 200 300 400 500 600 700 800 900 →
- Cardinal: two hundred eighty-seven
- Ordinal: 287th (two hundred eighty-seventh)
- Factorization: 7 × 41
- Divisors: 1, 7, 41, 287
- Greek numeral: ΣΠΖ´
- Roman numeral: CCLXXXVII, cclxxxvii
- Binary: 100011111_{2}
- Ternary: 101122_{3}
- Senary: 1155_{6}
- Octal: 437_{8}
- Duodecimal: 1BB_{12}
- Hexadecimal: 11F_{16}

287 is the natural number following 286 and preceding 288.

== In mathematics ==
- 287 is an odd composite number with 2 prime factors, namely 7 and 41. This makes it a semiprime.
- 287 is the sum of consecutive primes in three different ways, 89+97+101, 43+53+59+61+67, and 17+19+23+29+31+37+41+43+47
- 287 is a pentagonal number which follows the concept of triangular numbers.
- 287 is the sum of exactly 4 nonzero squares.
- 287 is a number where 6(287)-1 and 6(287)+1 are both prime.
