= 298 (number) =

| ← 297 | 298 | 299 → |
- ← 200 210 220 230 240 250 260 270 280 290 →: List of numbers; Integers; ← 0 100 200 300 400 500 600 700 800 900 →
- Cardinal: two hundred ninety-eight
- Ordinal: 298th (two hundred ninety-eighth)
- Factorization: 2 × 149
- Divisors: 1, 2, 149, 298
- Greek numeral: ΣϞΗ´
- Roman numeral: CCXCVIII, ccxcviii
- Binary: 100101010_{2}
- Ternary: 102001_{3}
- Senary: 1214_{6}
- Octal: 452_{8}
- Duodecimal: 20A_{12}
- Hexadecimal: 12A_{16}

298 is the natural number following 297 and preceding 299.

== In mathematics ==
- 298 is an even composite number with two prime factors.
- 298 is a nontotient and noncototient number which means that phi(x) and x-phi(x) both cannot result in 298.
- 298 is the number of polynomial symmetric functions in matrix of order 6 with separate row and column permutations.
- 298 is a number where 6n+1 and 6n-1 are both prime.
