= 292 (number) =

← 291	292	293 →
- ← 200 210 220 230 240 250 260 270 280 290 →: List of numbers; Integers; ← 0 100 200 300 400 500 600 700 800 900 →
- Cardinal: two hundred ninety-two
- Ordinal: 292nd (two hundred ninety-second)
- Factorization: 2^{2} × 73
- Divisors: 1, 2, 4, 73, 146, 292
- Greek numeral: ΣϞΒ´
- Roman numeral: CCXCII, ccxcii
- Binary: 100100100_{2}
- Ternary: 101211_{3}
- Senary: 1204_{6}
- Octal: 444_{8}
- Duodecimal: 204_{12}
- Hexadecimal: 124_{16}

292 is the natural number following 291 and preceding 293.

== In mathematics ==
- 292 is an even composite number with two prime factors.
- 292 is a noncototient number meaning that phi(x) cannot result in 292.
- 292 is an untouchable number meaning that the proper divisors of any number do not add up to 292.
- 292 is a repdigit in base 8 with it being 444.
- In the simplified continued fraction for pi, 292 is the 5th number.
