= 291 (number) =

← 290	291	292 →
- ← 290 291 292 293 294 295 296 297 298 299 →: List of numbers; Integers; ← 0 100 200 300 400 500 600 700 800 900 →
- Cardinal: two hundred ninety-one
- Ordinal: 291st (two hundred ninety-first)
- Factorization: 3 × 97
- Divisors: 1, 3, 97, 291
- Greek numeral: ΣϞΑ´
- Roman numeral: CCXCI, ccxci
- Binary: 100100011_{2}
- Ternary: 101210_{3}
- Senary: 1203_{6}
- Octal: 443_{8}
- Duodecimal: 203_{12}
- Hexadecimal: 123_{16}

291 is the natural number following 290 and preceding 292.

== In mathematics ==
- 291 is an odd composite number with two prime factors.
- 291 is a semiprime number meaning that it has 2 prime factors.
- 291 can be written as the sum of the nth prime plus n. It is the 52nd prime (239) plus 52.
- 291 is one of the positions of “c” in the tribonacci word abacabaab... defined by a->ab, b->ac, c->a.
- 291 is the sum of six 4th powers. It is the sum of 4^{4}+2^{4}+2^{4}+1^{4}+1^{4}+1^{4}.
