= 297 (number) =

| ← 296 | 297 | 298 → |
- ← 200 210 220 230 240 250 260 270 280 290 →: List of numbers; Integers; ← 0 100 200 300 400 500 600 700 800 900 →
- Cardinal: two hundred ninety-seven
- Ordinal: 297th (two hundred ninety-seventh)
- Factorization: 3^{3} × 11
- Divisors: 1, 3, 9, 11, 27, 33, 99, 297
- Greek numeral: ΣϞΖ´
- Roman numeral: CCXCVII, ccxcvii
- Binary: 100101001_{2}
- Ternary: 102000_{3}
- Senary: 1213_{6}
- Octal: 451_{8}
- Duodecimal: 209_{12}
- Hexadecimal: 129_{16}

297 is the natural number following 296 and preceding 298.

== In mathematics ==
- 297 is an odd composite number with two prime factors.
- 297 is the number of integer partitions of 17.
- 297 is a decagonal number which applies the properties of triangular numbers to decagons.
- 297 is a Kaprekar number which means that it can be rewritten as the singular sum of the digits in its square in the same order.
