= 253 (number) =

| ← 252 | 253 | 254 → |
- ← 250 251 252 253 254 255 256 257 258 259 →: List of numbers; Integers; ← 0 100 200 300 400 500 600 700 800 900 →
- Cardinal: two hundred fifty-three
- Ordinal: 253rd (two hundred fifty-third)
- Factorization: 11 × 23
- Divisors: 1, 11, 23, 253
- Greek numeral: ΣΝΓ´
- Roman numeral: CCLIII, ccliii
- Binary: 11111101_{2}
- Ternary: 100101_{3}
- Senary: 1101_{6}
- Octal: 375_{8}
- Duodecimal: 191_{12}
- Hexadecimal: FD_{16}

253 (two hundred [and] fifty-three) is the natural number following 252 and preceding 254.

== In mathematics ==
253 is:

- a semiprime since it is the product of 2 primes.
- a brilliant number, meaning that its prime factors have the same amount of digits
- the 22nd triangular number.
- a star number.
- a centered heptagonal number.
- a centered nonagonal number.
- a Blum integer.
- a member of the 13-aliquot tree.
