= 267 (number) =

← 266	267	268 →
- ← 260 261 262 263 264 265 266 267 268 269 →: List of numbers; Integers; ← 0 100 200 300 400 500 600 700 800 900 →
- Cardinal: two hundred sixty-seven
- Ordinal: 267th (two hundred sixty-seventh)
- Factorization: 3 × 89
- Divisors: 1, 3, 89, 267
- Greek numeral: ΣΞΖ´
- Roman numeral: CCLXVII, cclxvii
- Binary: 100001011_{2}
- Ternary: 100220_{3}
- Senary: 1123_{6}
- Octal: 413_{8}
- Duodecimal: 1A3_{12}
- Hexadecimal: 10B_{16}

267 (two hundred [and] sixty-seven) is the natural number following 266 and preceding 268.

== In mathematics ==
- 267 is an odd composite number with two prime factors.
- 267 is the number of planar partitions of the number 12. Planar partitions are the number of ways in which the given number can be organized as split in an array.
- 267 is the sum of perfect cubes in two different ways. It is the sum of 1^{3}+2^{3}+2^{3}+5^{3}+5^{3} and 2^{3}+2^{3}+2^{3}+3^{3}+6^{3}
- 267 is the largest number that cannot be expressed as the sum of distinct hexagonal numbers.
