= 258 (number) =

← 257	258	259 →
- ← 250 251 252 253 254 255 256 257 258 259 →: List of numbers; Integers; ← 0 100 200 300 400 500 600 700 800 900 →
- Cardinal: two hundred fifty-eight
- Ordinal: 258th (two hundred fifty-eighth)
- Factorization: 2 × 3 × 43
- Divisors: 1, 2, 3, 6, 43, 86, 129, 258
- Greek numeral: ΣΝΗ´
- Roman numeral: CCLVIII, cclviii
- Binary: 100000010_{2}
- Ternary: 100120_{3}
- Senary: 1110_{6}
- Octal: 402_{8}
- Duodecimal: 196_{12}
- Hexadecimal: 102_{16}

258 (two hundred [and] fifty-eight) is the natural number following 257 and preceding 259.

== In mathematics ==
258 is:

- a sphenic number
- a nontotient
- the sum of four consecutive prime numbers because 258 = 59 + 61 + 67 + 71
- 6^{3} + 6^{2} + 6
- an Ulam number
