= 275 (number) =

← 274	275	276 →
- ← 200 210 220 230 240 250 260 270 280 290 →: List of numbers; Integers; ← 0 100 200 300 400 500 600 700 800 900 →
- Cardinal: two hundred seventy-five
- Ordinal: 275th (two hundred seventy-fifth)
- Factorization: 5^{2} × 11
- Divisors: 1, 5, 11, 25, 55, 275
- Greek numeral: ΣΟΕ´
- Roman numeral: CCLXXV, cclxxv
- Binary: 100010011_{2}
- Ternary: 101012_{3}
- Senary: 1135_{6}
- Octal: 423_{8}
- Duodecimal: 1AB_{12}
- Hexadecimal: 113_{16}

275 (two hundred [and] seventy-five) is the natural number following 274 and preceding 276.

== In mathematics ==
- 275 is an odd composite number with 2 prime factors.
- 275 is equivalent to the number of partitions of 28 when no partition occurs only once. Partitions are the number of ways of writing a number as a sum of other positive integers.
- 275 is the sum of fifth powers of the first two primes (2⁵ + 3⁵ = 275).
- 275 is the maximum number of pieces made by cutting an annulus with 22 cuts.
- 275 is the smallest non semiprime that follows the equations n>1 and the greatest common denominator of n and bⁿ−b is 1 for some value of b.
