= 274 (number) =

← 273	274	275 →
- ← 200 210 220 230 240 250 260 270 280 290 →: List of numbers; Integers; ← 0 100 200 300 400 500 600 700 800 900 →
- Cardinal: two hundred seventy-four
- Ordinal: 274th (two hundred seventy-fourth)
- Factorization: 2 × 137
- Divisors: 1, 2, 137, 274
- Greek numeral: ΣΟΔ´
- Roman numeral: CCLXXIV, cclxxiv
- Binary: 100010010_{2}
- Ternary: 101011_{3}
- Senary: 1134_{6}
- Octal: 422_{8}
- Duodecimal: 1AA_{12}
- Hexadecimal: 112_{16}

274 (two hundred [and] seventy-four) is the natural number following 273 and preceding 275.

== In mathematics ==
- 274 is an even composite number.
- 274's sum of its proper divisors is 140.
- The number 274 is the 13th tribonacci number. This is defined by the equations P(0)=P(1)=0 P(2)=1 and P(n)=P(n-1)+P(n-2)+P(n-3).
- 274 is the sum of 5 perfect cubes. It is the sum of 2^{3}+2^{3}+2^{3}+5^{3}+5^{3}.
- 274 is a Stirling number of the first kind which counts the number of permutations and their number of cycles.
