= 242 (number) =

← 241	242	243 →
- ← 240 241 242 243 244 245 246 247 248 249 →: List of numbers; Integers; ← 0 100 200 300 400 500 600 700 800 900 →
- Cardinal: two hundred forty-two
- Ordinal: 242nd (two hundred forty-second)
- Factorization: 2 × 11^{2}
- Divisors: 1, 2, 11, 22, 121, 242
- Greek numeral: ΣΜΒ´
- Roman numeral: CCXLII, ccxlii
- Binary: 11110010_{2}
- Ternary: 22222_{3}
- Senary: 1042_{6}
- Octal: 362_{8}
- Duodecimal: 182_{12}
- Hexadecimal: F2_{16}

242 (two hundred [and] forty-two) is the natural number following 241 and preceding 243.

== In mathematics ==
242 is the smallest integer to start a run of four consecutive integers with the same number of divisors.

242 is a nontotient, since there is no integer with 242 coprimes below it.

242 reversed is 242, therefore it is a palindromic number.

242 is the number of parallelogram polyominoes with 8 cells.

242 is the sum of the elements in a 5-orthoplex: 32 polychora, 80 cells, 80 faces, 40 edges, and 10 vertices.
