= 234 (number) =

← 233	234	235 →
- ← 230 231 232 233 234 235 236 237 238 239 →: List of numbers; Integers; ← 0 100 200 300 400 500 600 700 800 900 →
- Cardinal: two hundred thirty-four
- Ordinal: 234th (two hundred thirty-fourth)
- Factorization: 2 × 3^{2} × 13
- Divisors: 1, 2, 3, 6, 9, 13, 18, 26, 39, 78, 117, 234
- Greek numeral: ΣΛΔ´
- Roman numeral: CCXXXIV, ccxxxiv
- Binary: 11101010_{2}
- Ternary: 22200_{3}
- Senary: 1030_{6}
- Octal: 352_{8}
- Duodecimal: 176_{12}
- Hexadecimal: EA_{16}

234 (two hundred [and] thirty-four) is the integer following 233 and preceding 235.

== In mathematics ==
234 is a practical number and an abundant number.

There are 234 ways of grouping six children into rings of at least two children with one child at the center of each ring.
