= 245 (number) =

← 244	245	246 →
- ← 240 241 242 243 244 245 246 247 248 249 →: List of numbers; Integers; ← 0 100 200 300 400 500 600 700 800 900 →
- Cardinal: two hundred forty-five
- Ordinal: 245th (two hundred forty-fifth)
- Factorization: 5 × 7^{2}
- Greek numeral: ΣΜΕ´
- Roman numeral: CCXLV, ccxlv
- Binary: 11110101_{2}
- Ternary: 100002_{3}
- Senary: 1045_{6}
- Octal: 365_{8}
- Duodecimal: 185_{12}
- Hexadecimal: F5_{16}

245 (two hundred [and] forty-five) is the natural number following 244 and preceding 246.

Additionally, 245 is:

- a composite number.
- a stella octangula number.
- palindromic in bases 34 (77_{34}) and 48 (55_{48})
- a Harshad number in bases 7, 9, 11, 15, 31, 35, 36 (and 14 other bases).
- the aliquot sum of any of these numbers: 723, 1195, 2563, 3859, 9259, 10123, 12283, 14659 and 14803
- part of the 97-aliquot tree. The aliquot sequence starting at 10222 is: 10222, 5978, 4624, 4893, 2595, 1581, 723, 245, 97, 1, 0
