= 254 (number) =

← 253	254	255 →
- ← 250 251 252 253 254 255 256 257 258 259 →: List of numbers; Integers; ← 0 100 200 300 400 500 600 700 800 900 →
- Cardinal: two hundred fifty-four
- Ordinal: 254th (two hundred fifty-fourth)
- Factorization: 2 × 127
- Divisors: 1, 2, 127, 254
- Greek numeral: ΣΝΔ´
- Roman numeral: CCLIV, ccliv
- Binary: 11111110_{2}
- Ternary: 100102_{3}
- Senary: 1102_{6}
- Octal: 376_{8}
- Duodecimal: 192_{12}
- Hexadecimal: FE_{16}

254 (two hundred [and] fifty-four) is the natural number following 253 and preceding 255.

== In mathematics ==
- It is a deficient number, since the sum of its divisors (excluding the same number) is 130 < 254.
- It is a semiprime number. Moreover, in American English, its name has a semiprime number of syllables.
- It is a square-free integer.
- It is a nontotient.
- It is a lazy caterer number.
- It is a congruent number.

== In geography ==
- The U.S state of Texas has 254 counties.
