= 252 (number) =

← 251	252	253 →
- ← 250 251 252 253 254 255 256 257 258 259 →: List of numbers; Integers; ← 0 100 200 300 400 500 600 700 800 900 →
- Cardinal: two hundred fifty-two
- Ordinal: 252nd (two hundred fifty-second)
- Factorization: 2^{2} × 3^{2} × 7
- Divisors: 1, 2, 3, 4, 6, 7, 9, 12, 14, 18, 21, 28, 36, 42, 63, 84, 126, 252
- Greek numeral: ΣΝΒ´
- Roman numeral: CCLII, cclii
- Binary: 11111100_{2}
- Ternary: 100100_{3}
- Senary: 1100_{6}
- Octal: 374_{8}
- Duodecimal: 190_{12}
- Hexadecimal: FC_{16}

252 (two hundred [and] fifty-two) is the natural number following 251 and preceding 253.

== In mathematics ==
252 is:

- the central binomial coefficient $\tbinom{10}{5}$, the largest one divisible by all coefficients in the previous line
- $\tau(3)$, where $\tau$ is the Ramanujan tau function.
- $\sigma_3(6)$, where $\sigma_3$ is the function that sums the cubes of the divisors of its argument:

$$1^3+2^3+3^3+6^3=(1^3+2^3)(1^3+3^3)=252.$$

- a practical number,
- a refactorable number,
- a hexagonal pyramidal number.
- a member of the Mian-Chowla sequence.

There are 252 points on the surface of a cuboctahedron of radius five in the face-centered cubic lattice, 252 ways of writing the number 4 as a sum of six squares of integers, 252 ways of choosing four squares from a 4×4 chessboard up to reflections and rotations, 252 ways of placing three pieces on a Connect Four board, and 252 possible dice combinations in the game Yahtzee.
