= 257 (number) =

← 256	257	258 →
- ← 250 251 252 253 254 255 256 257 258 259 →: List of numbers; Integers; ← 0 100 200 300 400 500 600 700 800 900 →
- Cardinal: two hundred fifty-seven
- Ordinal: 257th (two hundred fifty-seventh)
- Factorization: prime
- Prime: yes
- Greek numeral: ΣΝΖ´
- Roman numeral: CCLVII, cclvii
- Binary: 100000001_{2}
- Ternary: 100112_{3}
- Senary: 1105_{6}
- Octal: 401_{8}
- Duodecimal: 195_{12}
- Hexadecimal: 101_{16}

257 (two hundred [and] fifty-seven) is the natural number following 256 and preceding 258.

257 is a prime number of the form $2^{2^n}+1,$ specifically with n = 3, and therefore a Fermat prime. Thus, a regular polygon with 257 sides is constructible with compass and unmarked straightedge. It is currently the second largest known Fermat prime.

Analogously, 257 is the third Sierpinski prime of the first kind, of the form $n^{n} + 1$ ➜ $4^{4} + 1 = 257$.

It is also a balanced prime, an irregular prime, a prime that is one more than a square, and a Jacobsthal–Lucas number.

Four-fold 257 is 1028, which is the prime index of the fifth Mersenne prime, 8191.

There are exactly 257 combinatorially distinct convex polyhedra with eight vertices (or polyhedral graphs with eight nodes).

It is the 2nd Mersenne prime exponent that Mersenne conjectured it to be prime, but turned out to be composite (1st is 67).

It is also the 55th prime number.
