= 241 (number) =

← 240	241	242 →
- ← 240 241 242 243 244 245 246 247 248 249 →: List of numbers; Integers; ← 0 100 200 300 400 500 600 700 800 900 →
- Cardinal: two hundred forty-one
- Ordinal: 241st (two hundred forty-first)
- Factorization: prime
- Prime: twin prime
- Greek numeral: ΣΜΑ´
- Roman numeral: CCXLI, ccxli
- Binary: 11110001_{2}
- Ternary: 22221_{3}
- Senary: 1041_{6}
- Octal: 361_{8}
- Duodecimal: 181_{12}
- Hexadecimal: F1_{16}

241 (two hundred [and] forty-one) is the natural number between 240 and 242. It is also a prime number.

== In mathematics ==
- 241 is the larger of the twin primes (239, 241). Twin primes are pairs of primes separated by 2.
- 241 is a regular prime and a lucky prime. Since 241 = 15 × 2^{4} + 1, it is a Proth prime.
- 241 is a repdigit in base 15 (111).
- 241 is the only known Lucas–Wieferich prime to (U, V) = (3, −1).
