= 235 (number) =

← 234	235	236 →
- ← 230 231 232 233 234 235 236 237 238 239 →: List of numbers; Integers; ← 0 100 200 300 400 500 600 700 800 900 →
- Cardinal: two hundred thirty-five
- Ordinal: 235th (two hundred thirty-fifth)
- Factorization: 5 × 47
- Greek numeral: ΣΛΕ´
- Roman numeral: CCXXXV, ccxxxv
- Binary: 11101011_{2}
- Ternary: 22201_{3}
- Senary: 1031_{6}
- Octal: 353_{8}
- Duodecimal: 177_{12}
- Hexadecimal: EB_{16}

235 (two hundred [and] thirty-five) is the integer following 234 and preceding 236.

== In mathematics ==
235 is a heptagonal number, a centered triangular number, and a Smarandache–Wellin number. It is a Harshad number in bases 6, 47, 48, 95, 116, 189 and 231. It is palindromic in bases 4 (3223_{4}), 7 (454_{7}), 8 (353_{8}), 13 (151_{13}), and 46 (55_{46})

There are 235 different trees with 11 unlabeled nodes.

If an equilateral triangle is subdivided into smaller equilateral triangles whose side length is 1/9 as small, the resulting "matchstick arrangement" will have exactly 235 different equilateral triangles of varying sizes in it.

235 is the number of digits of the fourth Champernowne prime.

== In other fields ==
The Metonic cycle is 235 synodic months.
