= 266 (number) =

← 265	266	267 →
- ← 260 261 262 263 264 265 266 267 268 269 →: List of numbers; Integers; ← 0 100 200 300 400 500 600 700 800 900 →
- Cardinal: two hundred sixty-six
- Ordinal: 266th (two hundred sixty-sixth)
- Factorization: 2 × 7 × 19
- Divisors: 1, 2, 7, 14, 19, 38, 133, 266
- Greek numeral: ΣΞϚ´
- Roman numeral: CCLXVI, cclxvi
- Binary: 100001010_{2}
- Ternary: 100212_{3}
- Senary: 1122_{6}
- Octal: 412_{8}
- Duodecimal: 1A2_{12}
- Hexadecimal: 10A_{16}

266 (two hundred [and] sixty-six) is the natural number following 265 and preceding 267.

== In mathematics ==
- 266 is an even composite number with three prime factors.
- 266 is a repdigit in base 11. In base 11, 266 is 222.
- 266 is a sphenic number being the product of 3 prime numbers.
- 266 is a nontotient number which is an even number not in Euler’s totient function.
- 266 is an inconsummate number.
