= 251 (number) =

← 250	251	252 →
- ← 250 251 252 253 254 255 256 257 258 259 →: List of numbers; Integers; ← 0 100 200 300 400 500 600 700 800 900 →
- Cardinal: two hundred fifty-one
- Ordinal: 251st (two hundred fifty-first)
- Factorization: prime
- Prime: 54th
- Greek numeral: ΣΝΑ´
- Roman numeral: CCLI, ccli
- Binary: 11111011_{2}
- Ternary: 100022_{3}
- Senary: 1055_{6}
- Octal: 373_{8}
- Duodecimal: 18B_{12}
- Hexadecimal: FB_{16}

251 (two hundred [and] fifty-one) is the natural number between 250 and 252. It is also a prime number.

== In mathematics ==
251 is:

- a Sophie Germain prime.
- the sum of three consecutive primes (79 + 83 + 89) and seven consecutive primes (23 + 29 + 31 + 37 + 41 + 43 + 47).
- a Chen prime.
- an Eisenstein prime with no imaginary part.
- a de Polignac number, meaning that it is odd and cannot be formed by adding a power of two to a prime number.
- the first of four consecutive primes in an arithmetic progression, the common difference being 6: 251, 257, 263, 269.
- the smallest number that can be formed in more than one way by summing three positive cubes:$251 = 2^3 + 3^3 + 6^3 = 1^3 + 5^3 + 5^3.$

Every 5 × 5 matrix has exactly 251 square submatrices.
