= 236 (number) =

← 235	236	237 →
- ← 230 231 232 233 234 235 236 237 238 239 →: List of numbers; Integers; ← 0 100 200 300 400 500 600 700 800 900 →
- Cardinal: two hundred thirty-six
- Ordinal: 236th (two hundred thirty-sixth)
- Factorization: 2^{2} × 59
- Prime: no
- Greek numeral: ΣΛϚ´
- Roman numeral: CCXXXVI, ccxxxvi
- Binary: 11101100_{2}
- Ternary: 22202_{3}
- Senary: 1032_{6}
- Octal: 354_{8}
- Duodecimal: 178_{12}
- Hexadecimal: EC_{16}

236 (two hundred [and] thirty-six) is the natural number following 235 and preceding 237.

== Mathematics ==
236 is the 38th happy number.

There are 236 different connected graphs with eight vertices and nine edges, and 236 different degree sequences of six-vertex graphs. There are 236 different series reduced trees with 5 nodes. Equivalently, there are 236 total partitions of 5.
