= 232 (number) =

232 (two hundred [and] thirty-two) is the natural number following 231 and preceding 233.

== In mathematics ==
← 231	232	233 →
- ← 230 231 232 233 234 235 236 237 238 239 →: List of numbers; Integers; ← 0 100 200 300 400 500 600 700 800 900 →
- Cardinal: two hundred thirty-two
- Ordinal: 232nd (two hundred thirty-second)
- Factorization: 2^{3} × 29
- Prime: no
- Divisors: 1, 2, 4, 8, 29, 58, 116, 232
- Greek numeral: ΣΛΒ´
- Roman numeral: CCXXXII, ccxxxii
- Binary: 11101000_{2}
- Ternary: 22121_{3}
- Senary: 1024_{6}
- Octal: 350_{8}
- Duodecimal: 174_{12}
- Hexadecimal: E8_{16}

232 is both a central polygonal number, a decagonal number, and a cake number. It is both It is also a refactorable number, an idoneal number, a Riordan number and a noncototient.

232 is a telephone number: in a system of seven telephone users, there are 232 different ways of pairing up some of the users. There are also exactly 232 different eight-vertex connected indifference graphs, and 232 bracelets with eight beads of one color and seven of another. Because this number has the form 232 = 4^{4} − 4!, it follows that there are exactly 232 different functions from a set of four elements to a proper subset of the same set.
