= 231 (number) =

← 230	231	232 →
- ← 230 231 232 233 234 235 236 237 238 239 →: List of numbers; Integers; ← 0 100 200 300 400 500 600 700 800 900 →
- Cardinal: two hundred thirty-one
- Ordinal: 231st (two hundred thirty-first)
- Factorization: 3 × 7 × 11
- Divisors: 1, 3, 7, 11, 21, 33, 77, 231
- Greek numeral: ΣΛΑ´
- Roman numeral: CCXXXI, ccxxxi
- Binary: 11100111_{2}
- Ternary: 22120_{3}
- Senary: 1023_{6}
- Octal: 347_{8}
- Duodecimal: 173_{12}
- Hexadecimal: E7_{16}

231 (two hundred [and] thirty-one) is the natural number following 230 and preceding 232.

== In Mathematics ==
- 231 is a sphenic number.
- 231 is the 21st triangular number, a doubly triangular number, a hexagonal number, an octahedral number and a centered octahedral number.
- 231 is palindromic in base 2 (11100111_{2}).
- There are 231 integer partitions of 16.
- 231 is a zero of Mertens function.

== In measurement ==
A US gallon is defined by being exactly 231 cubic inches, the volume of a cylinder 7 inches in diameter and 6 inches tall, where $\pi$ is approximated as $\frac{22}{7}$.
