= 264 (number) =

← 263	264	265 →
- ← 260 261 262 263 264 265 266 267 268 269 →: List of numbers; Integers; ← 0 100 200 300 400 500 600 700 800 900 →
- Cardinal: two hundred sixty-four
- Ordinal: 264th (two hundred sixty-fourth)
- Factorization: 2^{3} × 3 × 11
- Divisors: 1, 2, 3, 4, 6, 8, 11, 12, 22, 24, 33, 44, 66, 88, 132, 264
- Greek numeral: ΣΞΔ´
- Roman numeral: CCLXIV, cclxiv
- Binary: 100001000_{2}
- Ternary: 100210_{3}
- Senary: 1120_{6}
- Octal: 410_{8}
- Duodecimal: 1A0_{12}
- Hexadecimal: 108_{16}

264 (two hundred [and] sixty-four) is the natural number following 263 and preceding 265.

== In mathematics ==
264 is:

- an even composite number.
- a Recontres number with one fixed point.
- the number of closed self-avoiding walks from the origin in 4 steps.
- the largest known number whose square is undulating: $264^2 = 69696$
