= 263 (number) =

← 262	263	264 →
- ← 260 261 262 263 264 265 266 267 268 269 →: List of numbers; Integers; ← 0 100 200 300 400 500 600 700 800 900 →
- Cardinal: two hundred sixty-three
- Ordinal: 263rd (two hundred sixty-third)
- Factorization: prime
- Prime: 56th
- Greek numeral: ΣΞΓ´
- Roman numeral: CCLXIII, cclxiii
- Binary: 100000111_{2}
- Ternary: 100202_{3}
- Senary: 1115_{6}
- Octal: 407_{8}
- Duodecimal: 19B_{12}
- Hexadecimal: 107_{16}

263 (two hundred [and] sixty-three) is the natural number between 262 and 264.

== In mathematics ==
263 is a balanced prime, an irregular prime, a Ramanujan prime, a Chen prime, and a safe prime.

263 is also a strictly non-palindromic number and a happy number.
