= 284 (number) =

← 283	284	285 →
- ← 200 210 220 230 240 250 260 270 280 290 →: List of numbers; Integers; ← 0 100 200 300 400 500 600 700 800 900 →
- Cardinal: two hundred eighty-four
- Ordinal: 284th (two hundred eighty-fourth)
- Factorization: 2^{2} × 71
- Divisors: 1, 2, 4, 71, 142, 284
- Greek numeral: ΣΠΔ´
- Roman numeral: CCLXXXIV, cclxxxiv
- Binary: 100011100_{2}
- Ternary: 101112_{3}
- Senary: 1152_{6}
- Octal: 434_{8}
- Duodecimal: 1B8_{12}
- Hexadecimal: 11C_{16}

284 is the natural number following 283 and preceding 285.

== In mathematics ==
- 284 is an even composite number with 2 distinct prime factors.
- 284 is in the first pair of amicable numbers with 220. That means that the sum of the proper divisors are the same between the two numbers.
- 284 can be written as a sum of exactly 4 nonzero perfect squares.
- 284 is a nontotient number which are numbers where phi(x) equaling that number has no solution.
- 284 is a number that is the nth prime plus n. It is the 51st prime number (233) plus 51.
