= 261 (number) =

← 260	261	262 →
- ← 260 261 262 263 264 265 266 267 268 269 →: List of numbers; Integers; ← 0 100 200 300 400 500 600 700 800 900 →
- Cardinal: two hundred sixty-one
- Ordinal: 261st (two hundred sixty-first)
- Factorization: 3^{2} × 29
- Divisors: 1, 3, 9, 29, 87, 261
- Greek numeral: ΣΞΑ´
- Roman numeral: CCLXI, cclxi
- Binary: 100000101_{2}
- Ternary: 100200_{3}
- Senary: 1113_{6}
- Octal: 405_{8}
- Duodecimal: 199_{12}
- Hexadecimal: 105_{16}

261 (two hundred [and] sixty-one) is the natural number following 260 and preceding 262.

== In Mathematics ==
There are six divisors of this number, the divisors being 1, 3, 9, 29, 87, and 261 itself. 261 is a deficient number, since 1 + 3 + 9 + 29 + 87 = 129 < 261.

261 is nonagonal number, unique period in base 2, and the number of possible unfolded tesseract patterns.

261 is a lucky number, as well as an odious number, meaning it has an odd number of 1's in its binary expansion, which is 100000101_{2} (with 3 ones in it).
