= 237 (number) =

| ← 236 | 237 | 238 → |
- ← 230 231 232 233 234 235 236 237 238 239 →: List of numbers; Integers; ← 0 100 200 300 400 500 600 700 800 900 →
- Cardinal: two hundred thirty-seven
- Ordinal: 237th (two hundred thirty-seventh)
- Factorization: 3 × 79
- Prime: no
- Greek numeral: ΣΛΖ´
- Roman numeral: CCXXXVII, ccxxxvii
- Binary: 11101101_{2}
- Ternary: 22210_{3}
- Senary: 1033_{6}
- Octal: 355_{8}
- Duodecimal: 179_{12}
- Hexadecimal: ED_{16}

237 (two hundred [and] thirty-seven) is the natural number following 236 and preceding 238.

237 is a lucky number, and one of the numbers in Aronson's sequence.
