= 256 (number) =

← 255	256	257 →
- ← 250 251 252 253 254 255 256 257 258 259 →: List of numbers; Integers; ← 0 100 200 300 400 500 600 700 800 900 →
- Cardinal: two hundred fifty-six
- Ordinal: 256th (two hundred fifty-sixth)
- Factorization: 2^{8}
- Greek numeral: ΣΝϚ´
- Roman numeral: CCLVI, cclvi
- Binary: 100000000_{2}
- Ternary: 100111_{3}
- Senary: 1104_{6}
- Octal: 400_{8}
- Duodecimal: 194_{12}
- Hexadecimal: 100_{16}

256 (two hundred [and] fifty-six) is the natural number following 255 and preceding 257.

== In mathematics ==
256 is a composite number, with the factorization 256 = 2^{8}, which makes it a power of two.

- 256 is 4 raised to the 4th power, so in tetration notation, 256 is ^{2}4.
  - 256 is the value of the expression $n^n$, where $n=4$.
- 256 is a perfect square (16^{2}).
- 256 is the only 3-digit number that is zenzizenzizenzic. It is 2 to the 8th power or $((2^2)^2)^2$.
- 256 is the lowest number that is a product of eight prime factors.
- 256 is the number of parts in all compositions of 7.

== In computing ==
One octet (in most cases one byte) is equal to eight bits and has 2^{8} or 256 possible values, counting from 0 to 255. The number 256 often appears in computer applications (especially on 8-bit systems) such as:

- The typical number of different values in each color channel of a digital color image (256 values for red, 256 values for green, and 256 values for blue used for 24-bit color) (see color space or Web colors).
- The split-screen level in Pac-Man, which results from the use of a single byte to store the internal level counter.
- A 256-bit unsigned integer can represent up to 115,792,089,237,316,195,423,570,985,008,687,907,853,269,984,665,640,564,039,457,584,007,913,129,639,936 values.
- The number of bits in the SHA-256 cryptographic hash.
