= 243 (number) =

| ← 242 | 243 | 244 → |
- ← 240 241 242 243 244 245 246 247 248 249 →: List of numbers; Integers; ← 0 100 200 300 400 500 600 700 800 900 →
- Cardinal: two hundred forty-three
- Ordinal: 243rd (two hundred forty-third)
- Factorization: 3^{5}
- Greek numeral: ΣΜΓ´
- Roman numeral: CCXLIII, ccxliii
- Binary: 11110011_{2}
- Ternary: 100000_{3}
- Senary: 1043_{6}
- Octal: 363_{8}
- Duodecimal: 183_{12}
- Hexadecimal: F3_{16}

243 (two hundred [and] forty-three) is the natural number following 242 and preceding 244.

Additionally, 243 is:

- the only 3-digit number that is a fifth power (3^{5}).
- a perfect totient number.
- the sum of five consecutive prime numbers (41 + 43 + 47 + 53 + 59).
- an 82-gonal number.
