= 93 (number) =

← 92	93	94 →
- ← 90 91 92 93 94 95 96 97 98 99 →: List of numbers; Integers; ← 0 10 20 30 40 50 60 70 80 90 →
- Cardinal: ninety-three
- Ordinal: 93rd (ninety-third)
- Factorization: 3 × 31
- Divisors: 1, 3, 31, 93
- Greek numeral: ϞΓ´
- Roman numeral: XCIII, xciii
- Binary: 1011101_{2}
- Ternary: 10110_{3}
- Senary: 233_{6}
- Octal: 135_{8}
- Duodecimal: 79_{12}
- Hexadecimal: 5D_{16}

93 (ninety-three) is the natural number following 92 and preceding 94.

== In mathematics ==
93 is:

- the 28th distinct semiprime and the 9th of the form (3.q) where q is a higher prime.
- the first number in the 3rd triplet of consecutive semiprimes, 93, 94, 95.
- with an aliquot sum of 35; itself a semiprime, within an aliquot sequence (93,35,13,1,0) of three numbers to the Prime 13 in the 13-Aliquot tree.
- a Blum integer, since its two prime factors, 3 and 31 are both Gaussian primes.
- a repdigit in base 5 (333_{5}), and 30 (33_{30}).
- palindromic in bases 2, 5, and 30.
- a lucky number.
- a cake number.
- an idoneal number.

There are 93 different cyclic Gilbreath permutations on 11 elements, and therefore there are 93 different real periodic points of order 11 on the Mandelbrot set.

== In other fields ==
93 is:

- The atomic number of neptunium, an actinide.
- The code for international direct dial phone calls to Afghanistan.
- The number of the FIRST Robotics team, NEW Apple Corps.
- One of two ISBN Group Identifiers for books published in India.
- The number of the French department Seine-Saint-Denis, a Paris suburb with high proportions of immigrants and low-income people, and as such used by many French rappers and those emulating their speech.

In classical Persian finger counting, the number 93 is represented by a closed fist. Because of this, classical Arab and Persian poets around 1 CE referred to someone's lack of generosity by saying that the person's hand made "ninety-three".

== See also ==
- 93 (Thelema), a greeting among Thelemites based on the numerological (gematric) value of Thelema (Will) and Agape (Love) in Greek letters.
