= 268 (number) =

← 267	268	269 →
- ← 260 261 262 263 264 265 266 267 268 269 →: List of numbers; Integers; ← 0 100 200 300 400 500 600 700 800 900 →
- Cardinal: two hundred sixty-eight
- Ordinal: 268th (two hundred sixty-eighth)
- Factorization: 2^{2} × 67
- Divisors: 1, 2, 4, 67, 134, 268
- Greek numeral: ΣΞΗ´
- Roman numeral: CCLXVIII, cclxviii
- Binary: 100001100_{2}
- Ternary: 100221_{3}
- Senary: 1124_{6}
- Octal: 414_{8}
- Duodecimal: 1A4_{12}
- Hexadecimal: 10C_{16}

268 (two hundred [and] sixty-eight) is the natural number following 267 and preceding 269.

== In mathematics ==
- 268 is an even composite number with two prime factors, but one of the prime factors is repeated: 268 = 67*2*2.
- 268 is the smallest number whose product of digits is 6 times the sum of its digits.
- 268 is untouchable which means that it is not the sum of the proper divisors of any number
- 268 is the sum of the consecutive primes 131 and 137.
