= 233 (number) =

← 232	233	234 →
- ← 230 231 232 233 234 235 236 237 238 239 →: List of numbers; Integers; ← 0 100 200 300 400 500 600 700 800 900 →
- Cardinal: two hundred thirty-three
- Ordinal: 233rd (two hundred thirty-third)
- Factorization: prime
- Prime: yes
- Greek numeral: ΣΛΓ´
- Roman numeral: CCXXXIII, ccxxxiii
- Binary: 11101001_{2}
- Ternary: 22122_{3}
- Senary: 1025_{6}
- Octal: 351_{8}
- Duodecimal: 175_{12}
- Hexadecimal: E9_{16}

233 (two hundred [and] thirty-three) is the natural number following 232 and preceding 234.

== In mathematics ==
233 is a Sophie Germain prime, a Pillai prime, and a Ramanujan prime. It is a Fibonacci prime, a fibonacci number that is also a prime number.

There are exactly 233 maximal planar graphs with ten vertices.

There are 233 connected topological spaces with four points.

It is the hypotenuse of a primitive Pythagorean triple: 233^{2} = 105^{2} + 208^{2}.
