= 222 (number) =

← 221	222	223 →
- ← 220 221 222 223 224 225 226 227 228 229 →: List of numbers; Integers; ← 0 100 200 300 400 500 600 700 800 900 →
- Cardinal: two hundred twenty-two
- Ordinal: 222nd (two hundred twenty-second)
- Factorization: 2 × 3 × 37
- Divisors: 1, 2, 3, 6, 37, 74, 111, 222
- Greek numeral: ΣΚΒ´
- Roman numeral: CCXXII, ccxxii
- Binary: 11011110_{2}
- Ternary: 22020_{3}
- Senary: 1010_{6}
- Octal: 336_{8}
- Duodecimal: 166_{12}
- Hexadecimal: DE_{16}

222 (two hundred [and] twenty-two) is the natural number following 221 and preceding 223.

== In mathematics ==
It is a decimal repdigit and a strobogrammatic number (meaning that it looks the same turned upside down on a calculator display). It is one of the numbers whose digit sum in decimal is the same as it is in binary.

222 is a noncototient, meaning that it cannot be written in the form n − φ(n) where φ is Euler's totient function counting the number of values that are smaller than n and relatively prime to it.

There are exactly 222 distinct ways of assigning a meet and join operation to a set of ten unlabelled elements in order to give them the structure of a lattice, and exactly 222 different six-edge polysticks.
