= 94 (number) =

Natural number

← 93	94	95 →
- ← 90 91 92 93 94 95 96 97 98 99 →: List of numbers; Integers; ← 0 10 20 30 40 50 60 70 80 90 →
- Cardinal: ninety-four
- Ordinal: 94th (ninety-fourth)
- Factorization: 2 × 47
- Divisors: 1, 2, 47, 94
- Greek numeral: ϞΔ´
- Roman numeral: XCIV, xciv
- Binary: 1011110_{2}
- Ternary: 10111_{3}
- Senary: 234_{6}
- Octal: 136_{8}
- Duodecimal: 7A_{12}
- Hexadecimal: 5E_{16}

94 (ninety-four) is the natural number following 93 and preceding 95.

== In mathematics ==
94 is:

- the twenty-ninth distinct semiprime and the fourteenth of the form (2.q).
- the ninth composite number in the 43-aliquot tree. The aliquot sum of 94 is 50 within the aliquot sequence; (94,50,43,1,0).
- the second number in the third triplet of three consecutive distinct semiprimes, 93, 94 and 95
- a 17-gonal number and a nontotient.
- an Erdős–Woods number, since it is possible to find sequences of 94 consecutive integers such that each inner member shares a factor with either the first or the last member.
- a Smith number in decimal.

== In computing ==
The ASCII character set (and, more generally, ISO 646) contains exactly 94 graphic non-whitespace characters, which form a contiguous range of code points. These codes (0x21–0x7E, as corresponding high bit set bytes 0xA1–0xFE) also used in various multi-byte encoding schemes for languages of East Asia, such as ISO 2022, EUC and GB 2312. For this reason, code pages of 94^{2} and even 94^{3} code points were common in East Asia in 1980s–1990s.

== In other fields ==
94 is:

- Used as a nonsense number by the British satire magazine Private Eye. Most commonly used in spoof articles end halfway through a sentence with "(continued p. 94)". The magazine never extends to 94 pages: this was originally a reference to the enormous size of some Sunday newspapers.
- The international calling code for Sri Lanka
