= 221 (number) =

← 220	221	222 →
- ← 220 221 222 223 224 225 226 227 228 229 →: List of numbers; Integers; ← 0 100 200 300 400 500 600 700 800 900 →
- Cardinal: two hundred twenty-one
- Ordinal: 221st (two hundred twenty-first)
- Factorization: 13 × 17
- Divisors: 1, 13, 17, 221
- Greek numeral: ΣΚΑ´
- Roman numeral: CCXXI, ccxxi
- Binary: 11011101_{2}
- Ternary: 22012_{3}
- Senary: 1005_{6}
- Octal: 335_{8}
- Duodecimal: 165_{12}
- Hexadecimal: DD_{16}

221 (two hundred [and] twenty-one) is the natural number following 220 and preceding 222.

== In mathematics ==
Its factorization as 13 × 17 makes 221 the product of two consecutive prime numbers, the sixth smallest such product.

221 is a centered square number, an Ulam number, and a brilliant number, meaning that its prime factors have the same amount of digits.
