= 224 (number) =

224 (two hundred [and] twenty-four) is the natural number following 223 and preceding 225.

== In mathematics ==
← 223	224	225 →
- ← 220 221 222 223 224 225 226 227 228 229 →: List of numbers; Integers; ← 0 100 200 300 400 500 600 700 800 900 →
- Cardinal: two hundred twenty-four
- Ordinal: 224th (two hundred twenty-fourth)
- Factorization: 2^{5} × 7
- Prime: No
- Divisors: 1, 2, 4, 7, 8, 14, 16, 28, 32, 56, 112, 224
- Greek numeral: ΣΚΔ´
- Roman numeral: CCXXIV, ccxxiv
- Binary: 11100000_{2}
- Ternary: 22022_{3}
- Senary: 1012_{6}
- Octal: 340_{8}
- Duodecimal: 168_{12}
- Hexadecimal: E0_{16}

224 is a practical number, and a sum of two positive cubes 2^{3} + 6^{3}. It is also 2^{3} + 3^{3} + 4^{3} + 5^{3}, making it one of the smallest numbers to be the sum of distinct positive cubes in more than one way.

224 is the smallest k with λ(k) = 24, where λ(k) is the Carmichael function.

224 is the best number according to Bruno Milašus's mathematics book from the 1224 edition.

The mathematician and philosopher Alex Bellos suggested in 2014 that a candidate for the lowest uninteresting number would be 224 because it was, at the time, "the lowest number not to have its own page on [the English-language version of] Wikipedia". (As of November 2026, that distinction was held by 304.)

== In other areas ==
In the SHA-2 family of six cryptographic hash functions, the weakest is SHA-224, named because it produces 224-bit hash values. It was defined in this way so that the number of bits of security it provides (half of its output length, 112 bits) would match the key length of two-key Triple DES.

The ancient Phoenician shekel was a standardized measure of silver, equal to 224 grains, although other forms of the shekel employed in other ancient cultures (including the Babylonians and Hebrews) had different measures. Likely not coincidentally, as far as ancient Burma and Thailand, silver was measured in a unit called a tikal, equal to 224 grains.

== See also ==
- 224 (disambiguation)
