= 99 (number) =

← 98	99	100 →
- ← 90 91 92 93 94 95 96 97 98 99 →: List of numbers; Integers; ← 0 10 20 30 40 50 60 70 80 90 →
- Cardinal: ninety-nine
- Ordinal: 99th (ninety-ninth)
- Factorization: 3^{2} × 11
- Divisors: 1, 3, 9, 11, 33, 99
- Greek numeral: ϞΘ´
- Roman numeral: XCIX, xcix
- Binary: 1100011_{2}
- Ternary: 10200_{3}
- Senary: 243_{6}
- Octal: 143_{8}
- Duodecimal: 83_{12}
- Hexadecimal: 63_{16}
- Chinese/Japanese /Korean numeral: 九十九

99 (ninety-nine) is the natural number following 98 and preceding 100.

== In mathematics ==
99 is:

- a composite number
- a square-prime of the form (p^{2}, q)
  - the 11th composite number of this form and the third of the form (3^{2}, q)
- has an aliquot sum of 57, within an aliquot sequence of two composite numbers (99,57,23,1,0), to the Prime in the 23-aliquot tree.
- a Kaprekar number
- a lucky number
- a palindromic number in base ten
- the ninth repdigit
- the sum of the cubes of three consecutive integers: 99 = 2^{3} + 3^{3} + 4^{3}.
- the sum of the sums of the divisors of the first 11 positive integers.
- $\frac{99}{70} = 1.4142{\color{red}8571}\ldots$ is a commonly used approximation of the irrational number √2
- ".99" is frequently used as a price ender in pricing.

== See also ==
- 99 (disambiguation)
