= 246 (number) =

← 245	246	247 →
- ← 240 241 242 243 244 245 246 247 248 249 →: List of numbers; Integers; ← 0 100 200 300 400 500 600 700 800 900 →
- Cardinal: two hundred forty-six
- Ordinal: 246th (two hundred forty-sixth)
- Factorization: 2 × 3 × 41
- Greek numeral: ΣΜϚ´
- Roman numeral: CCXLVI, ccxlvi
- Binary: 11110110_{2}
- Ternary: 100010_{3}
- Senary: 1050_{6}
- Octal: 366_{8}
- Duodecimal: 186_{12}
- Hexadecimal: F6_{16}

246 (two hundred [and] forty-six) is the natural number following 245 and preceding 247.

== In mathematics ==
246 is a composite number and an untouchable number. Additionally, it is the smallest number N for which it is known that there is an infinite number of prime gaps no larger than N.
