= 244 (number) =

← 243	244	245 →
- ← 240 241 242 243 244 245 246 247 248 249 →: List of numbers; Integers; ← 0 100 200 300 400 500 600 700 800 900 →
- Cardinal: two hundred forty-four
- Ordinal: 244th (two hundred forty-fourth)
- Factorization: 2^{2} × 61
- Prime: no
- Greek numeral: ΣΜΔ´
- Roman numeral: CCXLIV, ccxliv
- Binary: 11110100_{2}
- Ternary: 100001_{3}
- Senary: 1044_{6}
- Octal: 364_{8}
- Duodecimal: 184_{12}
- Hexadecimal: F4_{16}

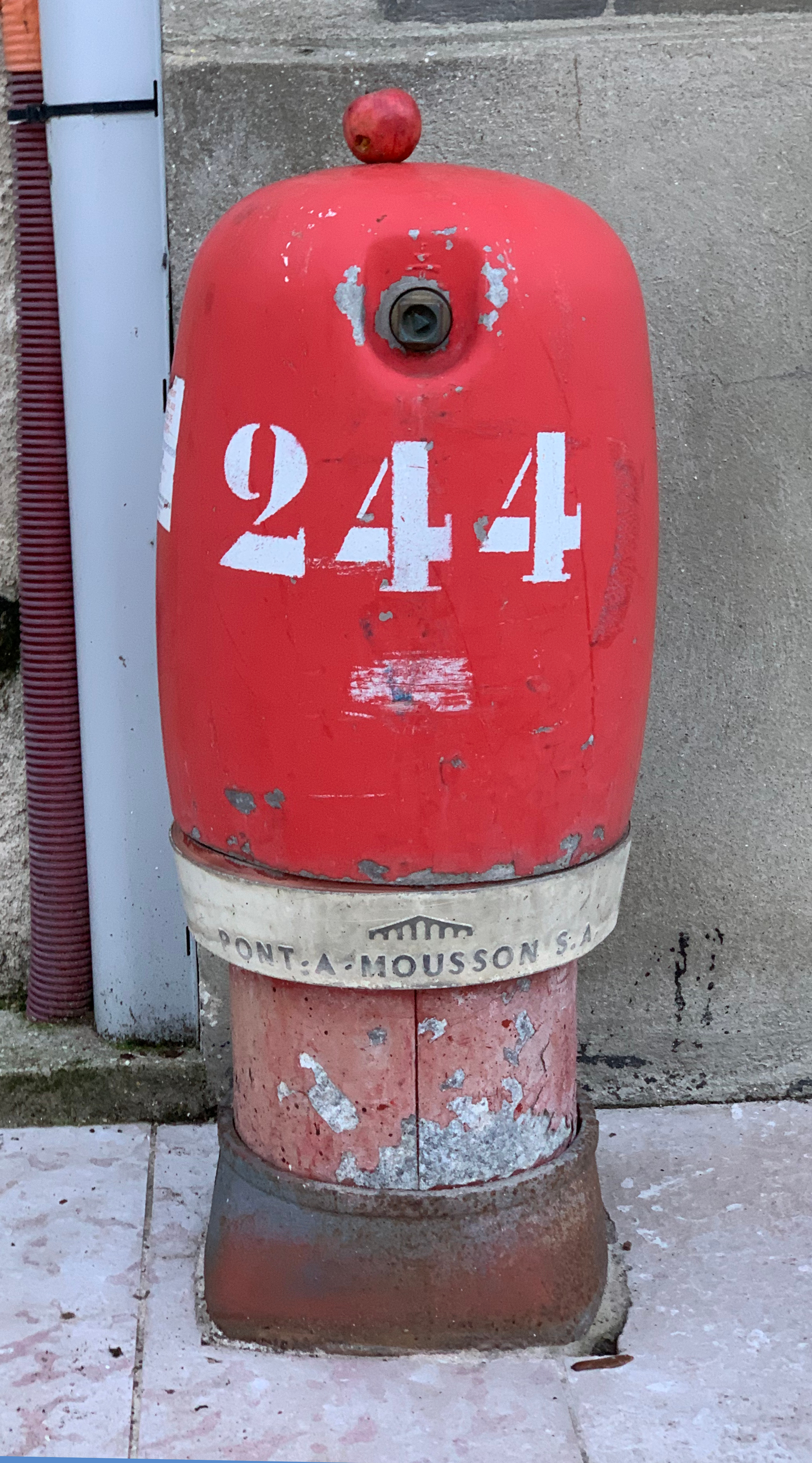
Fire hydrant in Auxerre

244 (two hundred [and] forty-four) is the natural number following 243 and preceding 245.

Additionally, 244 is:

- the sum of two nonzero fifth powers (244 = 1 + 243 = 1^{5} + 3^{5}).
- palindromic in bases 3 (100001_{3}), 11 (202_{11}), 60 (44_{60}), 121 (22_{121}), 243 (11_{243}).
- a Harshad number in bases 3, 9, 11, 61, 62, 81, 121, 122, 123 and 184.
- the second anti-perfect number, meaning that reversing the digits of the proper divisors of 244 and adding the results gives 244 back again.
- part of the sequence 1, 2, 4, 8, 61, 221, 244, ... in which each number is formed by reversing the digits of the double of the previous number.
- the number of non-isomorphic set-systems of weight 8
