= 247 (number) =

← 246	247	248 →
- ← 240 241 242 243 244 245 246 247 248 249 →: List of numbers; Integers; ← 0 100 200 300 400 500 600 700 800 900 →
- Cardinal: two hundred forty-seven
- Ordinal: 247th (two hundred forty-seventh)
- Factorization: 13 × 19
- Greek numeral: ΣΜΖ´
- Roman numeral: CCXLVII, ccxlvii
- Binary: 11110111_{2}
- Ternary: 100011_{3}
- Senary: 1051_{6}
- Octal: 367_{8}
- Duodecimal: 187_{12}
- Hexadecimal: F7_{16}

247 (two hundred [and] forty-seven) is the natural number following 246 and preceding 248. It is a composite number.

247 is a pentagonal number.
