= 288 (number) =

← 287	288	289 →
- ← 200 210 220 230 240 250 260 270 280 290 →: List of numbers; Integers; ← 0 100 200 300 400 500 600 700 800 900 →
- Cardinal: two hundred eighty-eight
- Ordinal: 288th (two hundred eighty-eighth)
- Factorization: 2^{5} × 3^{2}
- Greek numeral: ΣΠΗ´
- Roman numeral: CCLXXXVIII, cclxxxviii
- Binary: 100100000_{2}
- Ternary: 101200_{3}
- Senary: 1200_{6}
- Octal: 440_{8}
- Duodecimal: 200_{12}
- Hexadecimal: 120_{16}

288 (two hundred [and] eighty-eight) is the natural number following 287 and preceding 289. Because 288 = 2 · 12 · 12, it may also be called "two gross" or "two dozen dozen".

== In mathematics ==
=== Factorization properties ===
Because its prime factorization
$$288 = 2^5\cdot 3^2$$
contains only the first two prime numbers 2 and 3, 288 is a 3-smooth number. This factorization also makes it a highly powerful number, a number with a record-setting value of the product of the exponents in its factorization. Among the highly abundant numbers, numbers with record-setting sums of divisors, it is one of only 13 such numbers with an odd divisor sum.

Both 288 and 289 = 17^{2} are powerful numbers, numbers in which all exponents of the prime factorization are larger than one. This property is closely connected to being highly abundant with an odd divisor sum: all sufficiently large highly abundant numbers have an odd prime factor with exponent one, causing their divisor sum to be even. 288 and 289 form only the second consecutive pair of powerful numbers after 8 and 9.

=== Factorial properties ===
288 is a superfactorial, a product of consecutive factorials, since
$$288 = 1!\cdot 2!\cdot 3!\cdot  4! = 1^4\cdot 2^3\cdot 3^2\cdot 4^1.$$
Coincidentally, as well as being a product of descending powers, 288 is a sum of ascending powers:
$$288 = 1^1 + 2^2 + 3^3 + 4^4.$$

288 appears prominently in Stirling's approximation for the factorial, as the denominator of the second term of the Stirling series
$$n! \sim \sqrt{2\pi n}\left(\frac{n}{e}\right)^n \left(1 +\frac{1}{12n}+\frac{1}{288n^2} - \frac{139}{51840n^3} -\frac{571}{2488320n^4}+ \cdots \right).$$

=== Figurate properties ===
288 is connected to the figurate numbers in multiple ways. It is a pentagonal pyramidal number and a dodecagonal number. Additionally, it is the index, in the sequence of triangular numbers, of the fifth square triangular number:
$$41616 = \frac{288\cdot 289}{2} = 204^2.$$

=== Enumerative properties ===
There are 288 different ways of completely filling in a $4\times 4$ sudoku puzzle grid. For square grids whose side length is the square of a prime number, such as 4 or 9, a completed sudoku puzzle is the same thing as a "pluperfect Latin square", an $n\times n$ array in which every dissection into $n$ rectangles of equal width and height to each other has one copy of each digit in each rectangle. Therefore, there are also 288 pluperfect Latin squares of order 4. There are 288 different $2\times 2$ invertible matrices modulo six, and 288 different ways of placing two chess queens on a $6\times 6$ board with toroidal boundary conditions so that they do not attack each other. There are 288 independent sets in a 5-dimensional hypercube, up to symmetries of the hypercube.

== In other areas ==
In early 20th-century molecular biology, some mysticism surrounded the use of 288 to count protein structures, largely based on the fact that it is a smooth number.

A common mathematical pun involves the fact that 288 = 2 · 144, and that 144 is named as a gross: "Q: Why should the number 288 never be mentioned? A: it is two gross."
