= 228 (number) =

228 (two hundred [and] twenty-eight) is the natural number following 227 and preceding 229.

== In mathematics ==
← 227	228	229 →
- ← 220 221 222 223 224 225 226 227 228 229 →: List of numbers; Integers; ← 0 100 200 300 400 500 600 700 800 900 →
- Cardinal: two hundred twenty-eight
- Ordinal: 228th (two hundred twenty-eighth)
- Factorization: 2^{2} × 3 × 19
- Prime: no
- Divisors: 1, 2, 3, 4, 6, 12, 19, 38, 57, 76, 114, 228
- Greek numeral: ΣΚΗ´
- Roman numeral: CCXXVIII, ccxxviii
- Binary: 11100100_{2}
- Ternary: 22110_{3}
- Senary: 1020_{6}
- Octal: 344_{8}
- Duodecimal: 170_{12}
- Hexadecimal: E4_{16}

228 is a refactorable number and a practical number. There are 228 matchings in a ladder graph with five rungs. 228 is the smallest even number n such that the numerator of the nth Bernoulli number is divisible by a nontrivial square number that is relatively prime to n.

The binary form of 228 contains all the two digit binary numbers in sequence from highest to lowest (11 10 01 00).
