= 225 (number) =

← 224	225	226 →
- ← 220 221 222 223 224 225 226 227 228 229 →: List of numbers; Integers; ← 0 100 200 300 400 500 600 700 800 900 →
- Cardinal: two hundred twenty-five
- Ordinal: 225th (two hundred twenty-fifth)
- Factorization: 3^{2} × 5^{2}
- Prime: no
- Divisors: 1, 3, 5, 9, 15, 25, 45, 75, 225
- Greek numeral: ΣΚΕ´
- Roman numeral: CCXXV, ccxxv
- Binary: 11100001_{2}
- Ternary: 22100_{3}
- Senary: 1013_{6}
- Octal: 341_{8}
- Duodecimal: 169_{12}
- Hexadecimal: E1_{16}

225 (two hundred [and] twenty-five) is the natural number following 224 and preceding 226.

== In mathematics ==
225 is the smallest number that is a polygonal number in five different ways. It is a square number (225 = 15^{2}), an octagonal number, and a squared triangular number (225 = (1 + 2 + 3 + 4 + 5)^{2} = 1^{3} + 2^{3} + 3^{3} + 4^{3} + 5^{3}) .

As the square of a double factorial, 225 = 5!!^{2} counts the number of permutations of six items in which all cycles have even length, or the number of permutations in which all cycles have odd length. And as one of the Stirling numbers of the first kind, it counts the number of permutations of six items with exactly three cycles.

225 is a highly composite odd number, meaning that it has more divisors than any smaller odd numbers. After 1 and 9, 225 is the third smallest number n for which σ(φ(n)) = φ(σ(n)), where σ is the sum of divisors function and φ is Euler's totient function. 225 is a refactorable number.

225 is the smallest square number to have one of every digit in some number base (225 is 3201 in base 4)

225 is the smallest odd number with exactly nine divisors.
