= 248 (number) =

← 247	248	249 →
- ← 240 241 242 243 244 245 246 247 248 249 →: List of numbers; Integers; ← 0 100 200 300 400 500 600 700 800 900 →
- Cardinal: two hundred forty-eight
- Ordinal: 248th (two hundred forty-eighth)
- Factorization: 2^{3} × 31
- Greek numeral: ΣΜΗ´
- Roman numeral: CCXLVIII, ccxlviii
- Binary: 11111000_{2}
- Ternary: 100012_{3}
- Senary: 1052_{6}
- Octal: 370_{8}
- Duodecimal: 188_{12}
- Hexadecimal: F8_{16}

248 (two hundred [and] forty-eight) is the natural number following 247 and preceding 249.

Additionally, 248 is:

- a nontotient.
- a refactorable number.
- an untouchable number.
- palindromic in bases 13 (161_{13}), 30 (88_{30}), 61 (44_{61}) and 123 (22_{123}).
- a Harshad number in bases 3, 4, 6, 7, 9, 11, 13 (and 18 other bases).
- part of the 43-aliquot tree. The aliquot sequence starting at 248 is: 248, 232, 218, 112, 136, 134, 70, 74, 40, 50, 43, 1, 0.

The exceptional Lie group E_{8} has dimension 248.
