= 226 (number) =

226 (two hundred [and] twenty-six) is the natural number following 225 and preceding 227.

== In mathematics ==
← 225	226	227 →
- ← 220 221 222 223 224 225 226 227 228 229 →: List of numbers; Integers; ← 0 100 200 300 400 500 600 700 800 900 →
- Cardinal: two hundred twenty-six
- Ordinal: 226th (two hundred twenty-sixth)
- Factorization: 2 × 113
- Prime: no
- Divisors: 1, 2, 113, 226
- Greek numeral: ΣΚϚ´
- Roman numeral: CCXXVI, ccxxvi
- Binary: 11100010_{2}
- Ternary: 22101_{3}
- Senary: 1014_{6}
- Octal: 342_{8}
- Duodecimal: 16A_{12}
- Hexadecimal: E2_{16}

226 is a happy number, a semiprime, and a member of Aronson's sequence. At most 226 different permutation patterns can occur within a single 9-element permutation.
