= 244 (disambiguation) =

244 may refer to:

- 244 (year)
- 244 (number)
- ALCO 244
- UFC 244
