= 262 (number) =

← 261	262	263 →
- ← 260 261 262 263 264 265 266 267 268 269 →: List of numbers; Integers; ← 0 100 200 300 400 500 600 700 800 900 →
- Cardinal: two hundred sixty-two
- Ordinal: 262nd (two hundred sixty-second)
- Factorization: 2 × 131
- Divisors: 1, 2, 131, 262
- Greek numeral: ΣΞΒ´
- Roman numeral: CCLXII, cclxii
- Binary: 100000110_{2}
- Ternary: 100201_{3}
- Senary: 1114_{6}
- Octal: 406_{8}
- Duodecimal: 19A_{12}
- Hexadecimal: 106_{16}

262 (two hundred [and] sixty-two) is a natural number preceded by the number 261 and followed by 263. It has the prime factorization 2·131.

== Mathematical properties ==
There are four divisors of this number, the divisors being 1, 2, 131, and 262 itself, which makes it a semiprime.

It is the sixth meandric number, and the ninth open meandric number.

As it cannot be divided into the sum of the proper divisors of any number, it is the 17th untouchable number.

As it eventually reaches 1 when replaced by the sum of the square of each digit, it is the 40th 10-happy number.

As 262 is 262 backwards, it is a palindromic number.
