= 91 (number) =

← 90	91	92 →
- ← 90 91 92 93 94 95 96 97 98 99 →: List of numbers; Integers; ← 0 10 20 30 40 50 60 70 80 90 →
- Cardinal: ninety-one
- Ordinal: 91st (ninety-first)
- Factorization: 7 × 13
- Divisors: 1, 7, 13, 91
- Greek numeral: ϞΑ´
- Roman numeral: XCI, xci
- Binary: 1011011_{2}
- Ternary: 10101_{3}
- Senary: 231_{6}
- Octal: 133_{8}
- Duodecimal: 77_{12}
- Hexadecimal: 5B_{16}

91 (ninety-one) is the natural number following 90 and preceding 92.

== In mathematics ==
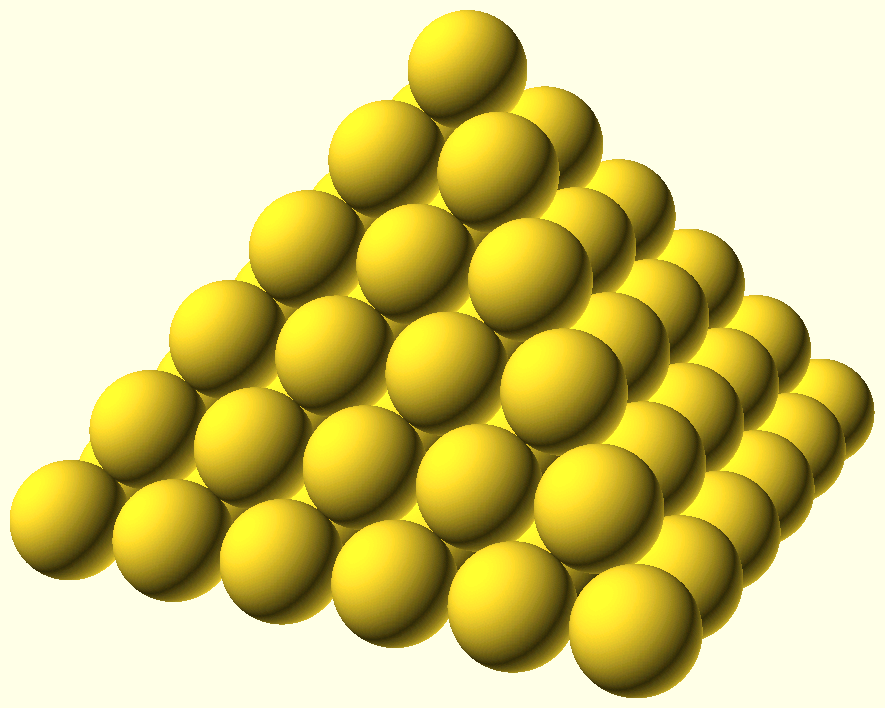
91 is a square pyramidal number.

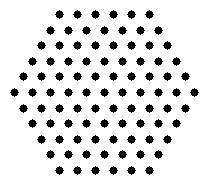
91 is a centered hexagonal number.

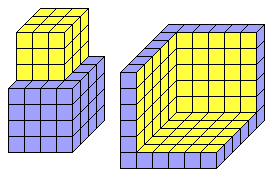
91 as the sum and difference of two positive cubes

91 is:

- the twenty-seventh distinct semiprime and the second of the form (7.q), where q is a higher prime.
- the aliquot sum of 91 is 21; itself a semiprime, within an aliquot sequence of two composite numbers (91, 21, 11, 1, 0) to the prime in the 11-aliquot tree. 91 is the fourth composite number in the 11-aliquot tree. (91, 51, 21, 18).
- the 13th triangular number.
- a hexagonal number, one of the few such numbers to also be a centered hexagonal number.
- a centered nonagonal number.
- a centered cube number.
- a square pyramidal number, being the sum of the squares of the first six integers.
- the smallest positive integer expressible as a sum of two cubes in two different ways if negative roots are allowed (alternatively the sum of two cubes and the difference of two cubes):
  91 = 6^{3} + (−5)^{3} = 4^{3} + 3^{3}. (See 1729 for more details).
  This implies that 91 is the second cabtaxi number.
- the smallest positive integer expressible as a sum of six distinct squares:
  91 = 1^{2} + 2^{2} + 3^{2} + 4^{2} + 5^{2} + 6^{2}.
- The only other ways to write 91 as a sum of distinct squares are:
  91 = 1^{2} + 4^{2} + 5^{2} + 7^{2} and 91 = 1^{2} + 3^{2} + 9^{2}.
- the smallest pseudoprime satisfying the congruence 3^{n} ≡ 3 mod n.
- a repdigit in base 9 (111_{9}).
- palindromic in bases 3 (10101_{3}), 9 (111_{9}), and 12 (77_{12}).
- a Riordan number.
- the smallest number that looks prime but is not, proven using the Rotten Theorem by John Conway.

The decimal equivalent of the fraction 1/91 can be obtained by using powers of 9.

== In science ==
- McCarthy 91 function, a recursive function in discrete mathematics
