= 92 (number) =

← 91	92	93 →
- ← 90 91 92 93 94 95 96 97 98 99 →: List of numbers; Integers; ← 0 10 20 30 40 50 60 70 80 90 →
- Cardinal: ninety-two
- Ordinal: 92nd (ninety-second)
- Factorization: 2^{2} × 23
- Divisors: 1, 2, 4, 23, 46, 92
- Greek numeral: ϞΒ´
- Roman numeral: XCII, xcii
- Binary: 1011100_{2}
- Ternary: 10102_{3}
- Senary: 232_{6}
- Octal: 134_{8}
- Duodecimal: 78_{12}
- Hexadecimal: 5C_{16}

92 (ninety-two) is the natural number following 91 and preceding 93.

== In mathematics ==
=== Form ===
92 is a composite number of the general form p^{2}q, where q is a higher prime (23). It is the tenth of this form and the eighth of the form 2^{2}q.

=== Properties ===
- 92 has an aliquot sum of 76, within an aliquot sequence of five numbers (92, 76, 64, 63, 41) before reaching 1. 44, the totient of 92, is also the composite index of 63, where the reduced totient of 92 is 22. 41 is the thirteenth prime number and sixth super-prime.
- Its arithmetic mean of its six divisors is twenty-eight, where (6, 28) represent the first two perfect numbers. It is the sixtieth arithmetic number, where 60 is the second unitary perfect number (the next such number is 90).
- For $n = 8$, there are 92 solutions in the n-Queens Problem.
- 92 is the eighth pentagonal number.
- 92 is an Erdős–Woods number, since it is possible to find sequences of 92 consecutive integers such that each inner member shares a factor with either the first or the last member.

There are 92 "atomic elements" in John Conway's look-and-say sequence, corresponding to the 92 non-transuranic elements in the chemist's periodic table.

==== Solids ====
The most faces or vertices an Archimedean or Catalan solid can have is 92: the snub dodecahedron has 92 faces while its dual polyhedron, the pentagonal hexecontahedron, has 92 vertices. On the other hand, as a simple polyhedron, the final stellation of the icosahedron has 92 vertices.

There are 92 Johnson solids.

==== Abstract algebra ====
92 is the total number of objects that are permuted by the series of five finite, simple Mathieu groups $\mathbb M_{n}$ (collectively), as defined by permutations based on elements $n \in \{11, 12, 22, 23, 24\}$. Half of 92 is 46 (the largest even number that is not the sum of two abundant numbers), which is the number of maximal subgroups of the friendly giant $\mathbb F_{1}$, the largest "sporadic" finite simple group.

=== In different bases ===
92 is palindromic in other bases, where it is represented as 232_{6}, 161_{7}, 44_{22}, and 22_{45}.

There are 92 numbers $n$ such that $2^{n}$ does not contain all digits in base ten (the largest such number is 168, where 68 is the smallest number with such a representation containing all digits, followed by 70 and 79).

== In other fields ==
Ninety-two is also:

- The number which runs through almost every single of British film-maker Peter Greenaway's films. This number has special association with the fictional character of Greenaway's creation, Tulse Luper. It is said the number itself is based on a mathematical error in calculations concerning John Cage's work Indeterminacy. See The Falls for extensive use of this number.
- The international calling code for Pakistan
