= 238 (number) =

238 (two hundred [and] thirty-eight) is the natural number following 237 and preceding 239.

== In mathematics ==
← 237	238	239 →
- ← 230 231 232 233 234 235 236 237 238 239 →: List of numbers; Integers; ← 0 100 200 300 400 500 600 700 800 900 →
- Cardinal: two hundred thirty-eight
- Ordinal: 238th (two hundred thirty-eighth)
- Factorization: 2 × 7 × 17
- Prime: no
- Greek numeral: ΣΛΗ´
- Roman numeral: CCXXXVIII, ccxxxviii
- Binary: 11101110_{2}
- Ternary: 22211_{3}
- Senary: 1034_{6}
- Octal: 356_{8}
- Duodecimal: 17A_{12}
- Hexadecimal: EE_{16}

238 is an untouchable number. There are 238 2-vertex-connected graphs on five labeled vertices, and 238 order-5 polydiamonds (polyiamonds that can partitioned into 5 diamonds). Out of the 720 permutations of six elements, exactly 238 of them have a unique longest increasing subsequence.

There are 238 compact and paracompact hyperbolic groups of ranks 3 through 10.
