= 97 (number) =

← 96	97	98 →
- ← 90 91 92 93 94 95 96 97 98 99 →: List of numbers; Integers; ← 0 10 20 30 40 50 60 70 80 90 →
- Cardinal: ninety-seven
- Ordinal: 97th (ninety-seventh)
- Factorization: prime
- Prime: 25th
- Divisors: 1, 97
- Greek numeral: ϞΖ´
- Roman numeral: XCVII, xcvii
- Binary: 1100001_{2}
- Ternary: 10121_{3}
- Senary: 241_{6}
- Octal: 141_{8}
- Duodecimal: 81_{12}
- Hexadecimal: 61_{16}

97 (ninety-seven) is the natural number following 96 and preceding 98.

== In mathematics ==
97 is the 25th prime number, a happy prime, and an emirp with 79. It is the smallest odd prime that is not a cluster prime. Because 97 = 3 × 2^{5} + 1, 97 is a Proth prime and a Pierpont prime. There are 97 primes less than 2^{9}.

97 is the eleventh member of the Mian–Chowla sequence.

Since there is no integer that added to its own digits adds up to 97, 97 is a self number in base 10.

$\frac{97}{56} = 1.732{\color{red}1428}\ldots$ is a commonly used approximation of the irrational number √3.
