= 98 (number) =

← 97	98	99 →
- ← 90 91 92 93 94 95 96 97 98 99 →: List of numbers; Integers; ← 0 10 20 30 40 50 60 70 80 90 →
- Cardinal: ninety-eight
- Ordinal: 98th (ninety-eighth)
- Factorization: 2 × 7^{2}
- Divisors: 1, 2, 7, 14, 49, 98
- Greek numeral: ϞΗ´
- Roman numeral: XCVIII, xcviii
- Binary: 1100010_{2}
- Ternary: 10122_{3}
- Senary: 242_{6}
- Octal: 142_{8}
- Duodecimal: 82_{12}
- Hexadecimal: 62_{16}

98 (ninety-eight) is the natural number following 97 and preceding 99.

== In mathematics ==
98 is a Wedderburn–Etherington number and a nontotient.
