= 223 (number) =

← 222	223	224 →
- ← 220 221 222 223 224 225 226 227 228 229 →: List of numbers; Integers; ← 0 100 200 300 400 500 600 700 800 900 →
- Cardinal: two hundred twenty-three
- Ordinal: 223rd (two hundred twenty-third)
- Factorization: prime
- Prime: 48th
- Greek numeral: ΣΚΓ´
- Roman numeral: CCXXIII, ccxxiii
- Binary: 11011111_{2}
- Ternary: 22021_{3}
- Senary: 1011_{6}
- Octal: 337_{8}
- Duodecimal: 167_{12}
- Hexadecimal: DF_{16}

223 (two hundred [and] twenty-three) is the natural number following 222 and preceding 224.

== In mathematics ==
223 is a lucky prime and a left-and-right-truncatable prime.

Among the 720 permutations of the numbers from 1 to 6, exactly 223 of them have the property that at least one of the numbers is fixed in place by the permutation and the numbers less than it and greater than it are separately permuted among themselves.

In connection with Waring's problem, 223 requires the maximum number of terms (37 terms) when expressed as a sum of positive fifth powers, and is the only number that requires that many terms.
