= 224 (disambiguation) =

224 may refer to:

- The year 224
- The year 224 BC
- The number 224 - see 224 (number)
- The area code 224 - see Area codes 847 and 224
- 224 Oceana, an asteroid
- 2-2-4, a Whyte notation classification of steam locomotive
- 224 (EP), by Kiss of Life

== See also ==
- 224th (disambiguation)
