= 95 (number) =

← 94	95	96 →
- ← 90 91 92 93 94 95 96 97 98 99 →: List of numbers; Integers; ← 0 10 20 30 40 50 60 70 80 90 →
- Cardinal: ninety-five
- Ordinal: 95th (ninety-fifth)
- Factorization: 5 × 19
- Divisors: 1, 5, 19, 95
- Greek numeral: ϞΕ´
- Roman numeral: XCV, xcv
- Binary: 1011111_{2}
- Ternary: 10112_{3}
- Senary: 235_{6}
- Octal: 137_{8}
- Duodecimal: 7B_{12}
- Hexadecimal: 5F_{16}

95 (ninety-five) is the natural number following 94 and preceding 96.

== In mathematics ==
95 is the third composite number in the 6-aliquot tree. The aliquot sum of 95 is 25, within the aliquot sequence (95,25, 6, 1).

95 is the last member in the third triplet of distinct semiprimes 93, 94, and 95.

95 is the smallest composite Thabit number.

95 is the smallest integer for which the Mertens function is greater than 1.

In statistics, a 95% confidence interval is considered satisfactory for most purposes.
