= 227 (number) =

← 226	227	228 →
- ← 220 221 222 223 224 225 226 227 228 229 →: List of numbers; Integers; ← 0 100 200 300 400 500 600 700 800 900 →
- Cardinal: two hundred twenty-seven
- Ordinal: 227th (two hundred twenty-seventh)
- Factorization: prime
- Prime: 49th
- Greek numeral: ΣΚΖ´
- Roman numeral: CCXXVII, ccxxvii
- Binary: 11100011_{2}
- Ternary: 22102_{3}
- Senary: 1015_{6}
- Octal: 343_{8}
- Duodecimal: 16B_{12}
- Hexadecimal: E3_{16}

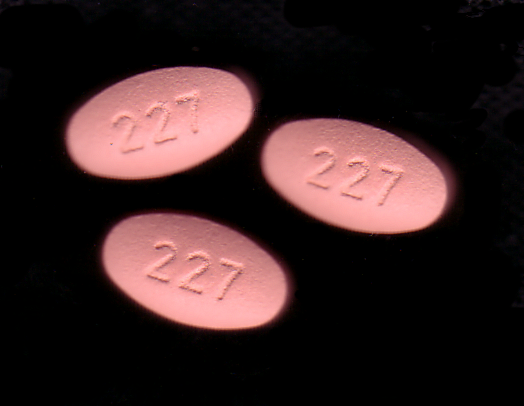
ISENTRESS™ (raltegravir) 400 mg tablets

227 (two hundred [and] twenty-seven) is the natural number following 226 and preceding 228. It is also a prime number.

== In mathematics ==
227 is a twin prime with 229, and the start of a prime triplet with 229 and 233. 227 is a safe prime, a regular prime, a Pillai prime, a Stern prime, and a Ramanujan prime.
