= Tetradic number =

A tetradic number, also known as a four-way number, is a number that remains the same when flipped back to front, flipped front to back, mirrored up-down, or flipped up-down. The only numbers that remain the same which turned up-side-down or mirrored are 0, 1, and 8, so a tetradic number is a palindromic number containing only 0, 1, and 8 as digits. (This is dependent on the use of a handwriting style or font in which these digits are symmetrical, as well on the use of Arabic numerals in the first place.) The first few tetradic numbers are 1, 8, 11, 88, 101, 111, 181, 808, 818, ... (OEIS A006072).

Tetradic numbers are also known as four-way numbers because they have four-way symmetry and can flipped back to front, flipped front to back, mirrored up-down, or flipped up-down and always stay the same. The four-way symmetry explains the name, due to tetra- being the Greek prefix for four. Tetradic numbers are both strobogrammatic and palindromic.

A larger tetradic number can always be generated by adding another tetradic number to each end, retaining the symmetry.

== Tetradic primes ==
Tetradic primes are a specific type of tetradic number defined as tetradic numbers that are also prime numbers. The first few tetradic primes are 11, 101, 181, 18181, 1008001, 1180811, 1880881, 1881881, ... (OEIS A068188).
