= NGC 273 =

Galaxy in the constellation Cetus

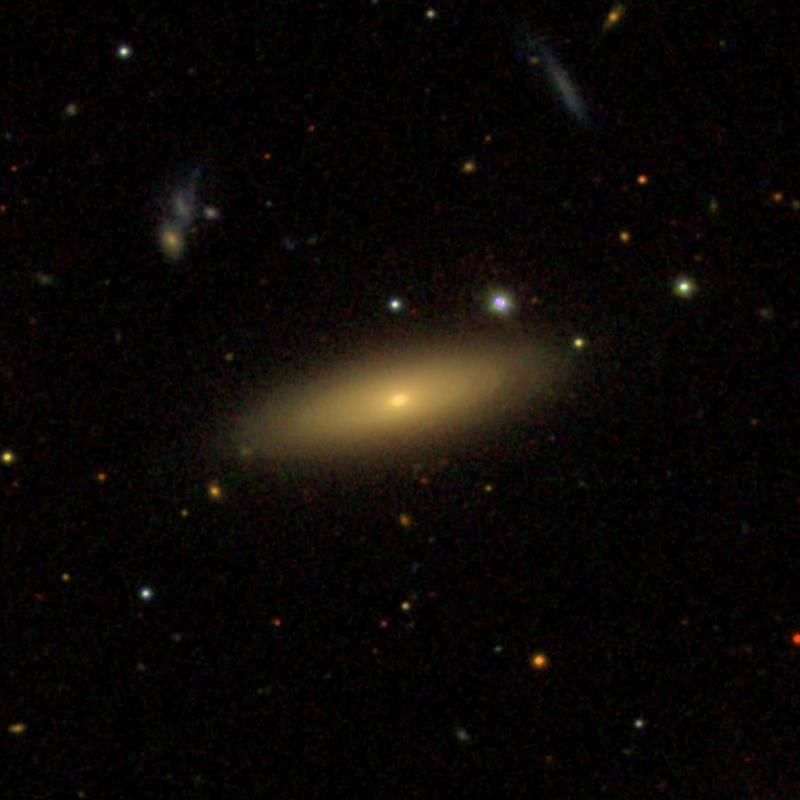
- SDSS image of NGC 273

Observation data (J2000 epoch)
- Constellation: Cetus
- Right ascension: 00^{h} 50^{m} 48.4^{s}
- Declination: −06° 53′ 08″
- Redshift: 0.016195
- Apparent magnitude (V): 14.07

Characteristics
- Type: S0
- Apparent size (V): 2.2' × 0.7'

Other designations
- MCG -01-03-019, 2MASX J00504843-0653087, 2MASXi J0050484-065307, 6dF J0050485-065309, PGC 2959.

NGC 273 is an edge-on lenticular galaxy in the constellation Cetus. It was discovered on September 10, 1785, by William Herschel.
