= 96 (number) =

← 95	96	97 →
- ← 90 91 92 93 94 95 96 97 98 99 →: List of numbers; Integers; ← 0 10 20 30 40 50 60 70 80 90 →
- Cardinal: ninety-six
- Ordinal: 96th (ninety-sixth)
- Factorization: 2^{5} × 3
- Divisors: 1, 2, 3, 4, 6, 8, 12, 16, 24, 32, 48, 96
- Greek numeral: ϞϚ´
- Roman numeral: XCVI, xcvi
- Binary: 1100000_{2}
- Ternary: 10120_{3}
- Senary: 240_{6}
- Octal: 140_{8}
- Duodecimal: 80_{12}
- Hexadecimal: 60_{16}

96 (ninety-six) is the natural number following 95 and preceding 97.

== In mathematics ==
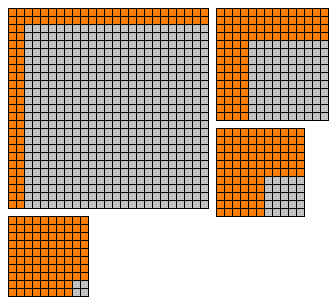
96 as the difference of two squares (in orange).

96 is an octagonal number, a refactorable number, and an untouchable number. It is a semiperfect number since it is a multiple of a perfect number, namely 6. It is the fourth Granville number and the second non-perfect Granville number. It is an abundant number since the sum of its proper divisors, 156, is greater than 96. 96 has 12 divisors. As no smaller number has 12 or more divisors, 96 is a largely composite number.

96 is an Erdős–Woods number, since it is possible to find sequences of 96 consecutive integers such that each inner member shares a factor with either the first or the last member.

96 is strobogrammatic in bases 10 (96_{10}), 11 (88_{11}) and 95 (11_{95}). It ispalindromic in bases 11 (88_{11}), 15 (66_{15}), 23 (44_{23}), 31 (33_{31}), 47 (22_{47}) and 95 (11_{95}).

96 is the sum of Euler's totient function φ(x) over the first seventeen integers.

96 is the smallest natural number that can be expressed as the difference of two nonzero squares in more than three ways:

96 = $10^2-2^2$ = $11^2-5^2$ = $14^2-10^2$ = $25^2-23^2$.

Skilling's figure, a degenerate uniform polyhedron, has Euler characteristic $\chi=-96.$

Every integer greater than 96 may be represented as a sum of distinct super-prime numbers.
