= 279 (number) =

← 278	279	280 →
- ← 270 271 272 273 274 275 276 277 278 279 →: List of numbers; Integers; ← 0 100 200 300 400 500 600 700 800 900 →
- Cardinal: two hundred seventy-nine
- Ordinal: 279th (two hundred seventy-ninth)
- Factorization: 3^{2} × 31
- Divisors: 1, 3, 9, 31, 93, 279
- Greek numeral: ΣΟΘ´
- Roman numeral: CCLXXIX, cclxxix
- Binary: 100010111_{2}
- Ternary: 101100_{3}
- Senary: 1143_{6}
- Octal: 427_{8}
- Duodecimal: 1B3_{12}
- Hexadecimal: 117_{16}

279 (two hundred [and] seventy-nine) is the natural number following 278 and preceding 280.

== In mathematics ==
- 279 is an odd composite number with two prime factors.
- Waring’s Conjecture is g(n)=2^{n}+⌊(3/2)^{n}⌋-2. When 8 is plugged in for n, the result is 279. That means that any positive integer can be formed with at most 279 numbers to the 8th power.
- 279 is the smallest number whose product of digits is 7 times the sum of its digits.
- 279 can be written as the sum of 4 nonzero perfect squares.
