= 269 (number) =

| ← 268 | 269 | 270 → |
- ← 260 261 262 263 264 265 266 267 268 269 →: List of numbers; Integers; ← 0 100 200 300 400 500 600 700 800 900 →
- Cardinal: two hundred sixty-nine
- Ordinal: 269th (two hundred sixty-ninth)
- Factorization: prime
- Prime: yes
- Greek numeral: ΣΞΘ´
- Roman numeral: CCLXIX, cclxix
- Binary: 100001101_{2}
- Ternary: 100222_{3}
- Senary: 1125_{6}
- Octal: 415_{8}
- Duodecimal: 1A5_{12}
- Hexadecimal: 10D_{16}

269 (two hundred [and] sixty-nine) is the natural number between 268 and 270. It is also a prime number.

== In mathematics ==
269 is a twin prime, and a Ramanujan prime. It is the largest prime factor of 9! + 1 = 362881, and the smallest natural number that cannot be represented as the determinant of a 10 × 10 (0,1)-matrix.

== In other fields ==
- Calf 269 was a calf that rose to fame after being rescued by Israeli activists in 2012. As a result, numerous people branded the number "269" into their bodies over 2012 and 2013.

== See also ==
- 269 AD
- 269 BC
