= 289 (number) =

← 288	289	290 →
- ← 200 210 220 230 240 250 260 270 280 290 →: List of numbers; Integers; ← 0 100 200 300 400 500 600 700 800 900 →
- Cardinal: two hundred eighty-nine
- Ordinal: 289th (two hundred eighty-ninth)
- Factorization: 17^{2}
- Divisors: 1, 17, 289
- Greek numeral: ΣΠΘ´
- Roman numeral: CCLXXXIX, cclxxxix
- Binary: 100100001_{2}
- Ternary: 101201_{3}
- Senary: 1201_{6}
- Octal: 441_{8}
- Duodecimal: 201_{12}
- Hexadecimal: 121_{16}

289 is the natural number following 288 and preceding 290.

== In mathematics ==
- 289 is an odd composite number with only one prime factor.
- 289 is the 9th Friedman number. Friedman numbers are numbers that can be written by using its own digits the exact number of times they show up in the number. This one can be expressed as (8+9)^{2}.
- 289 is a perfect square being equal to 17^{2}. It is also the 7th number to only have 3 factors because it is a square of a prime number.
- 289 is the sum of perfect cubes. It is the sum of 1^{3}+2^{3}+4^{3}+6^{3}.
- 289 is equivalent to the sum of the first 5 whole numbers to their respective powers. It is equal to 0^{0}+1^{1}+2^{2}+3^{3}+4^{4}.
