= 259 (number) =

← 258	259	260 →
- ← 250 251 252 253 254 255 256 257 258 259 →: List of numbers; Integers; ← 0 100 200 300 400 500 600 700 800 900 →
- Cardinal: two hundred fifty-nine
- Ordinal: 259th (two hundred fifty-ninth)
- Factorization: 7 × 37
- Divisors: 1, 7, 37, 259
- Greek numeral: ΣΝΘ´
- Roman numeral: CCLIX, cclix
- Binary: 100000011_{2}
- Ternary: 100121_{3}
- Senary: 1111_{6}
- Octal: 403_{8}
- Duodecimal: 197_{12}
- Hexadecimal: 103_{16}

259 (two hundred [and] fifty-nine) is the natural number following 258 and preceding 260.

== In mathematics ==
259 is:

- a semiprime
- 6^{3} + 6^{2} + 6 + 1, so 259 is a repdigit in base 6 (1111_{6})
- a lucky number
- Assuming A=1, B=2, C=3, D=4, etc..., all the way up to Z=26, when 259 is spelled out in word form, including the word "and", and when every single number indicating its letter position is added, the value is 259.
