= 249 (number) =

| ← 248 | 249 | 250 → |
- ← 240 241 242 243 244 245 246 247 248 249 →: List of numbers; Integers; ← 0 100 200 300 400 500 600 700 800 900 →
- Cardinal: two hundred forty-nine
- Ordinal: 249th (two hundred forty-ninth)
- Factorization: 3 × 83
- Greek numeral: ΣΜΘ´
- Roman numeral: CCXLIX, ccxlix
- Binary: 11111001_{2}
- Ternary: 100020_{3}
- Senary: 1053_{6}
- Octal: 371_{8}
- Duodecimal: 189_{12}
- Hexadecimal: F9_{16}

249 (two hundred [and] forty-nine) is the natural number following 248 and preceding 250.

== In mathematics ==
In mathematics, 249 is:

- a Blum integer.
- a semiprime.
- a square-free number.
- palindromic in base 82 (33_{82}).
- a Harshad number in bases 3, 83, 84, 124, 167 and 247.
- the aliquot sum of any of these numbers: 375, 531, 1687, 4351, 7807, 12127, 14647 and 15151.
- part of the 3-aliquot tree. The aliquot sequence starting at 288 is: 288, 531, 249, 87, 33, 15, 9, 4, 3, 1, 0.
