= 239 (number) =

← 238	239	240 →
- ← 230 231 232 233 234 235 236 237 238 239 →: List of numbers; Integers; ← 0 100 200 300 400 500 600 700 800 900 →
- Cardinal: two hundred thirty-nine
- Ordinal: 239th (two hundred thirty-ninth)
- Factorization: prime
- Prime: yes
- Greek numeral: ΣΛΘ´
- Roman numeral: CCXXXIX, ccxxxix
- Binary: 11101111_{2}
- Ternary: 22212_{3}
- Senary: 1035_{6}
- Octal: 357_{8}
- Duodecimal: 17B_{12}
- Hexadecimal: EF_{16}

239 (two hundred [and] thirty-nine) is the natural number following 238 and preceding 240.

== Properties ==
239 is a prime number. The next is 241, with which it forms a pair of twin primes; hence, it is also a Chen prime. 239 is a Sophie Germain prime and a Newman–Shanks–Williams prime. It is an Eisenstein prime with no imaginary part and real part of the form 3n − 1 (with no exponentiation implied). 239 is a factor of the repdigit 1111111, with the other prime factor being 4649. 239 is also a happy number.

239 is the smallest positive integer d such that the imaginary quadratic field Q(√−d) has class number = 15.

239 is the smallest number that contains the highest possible digit in all bases from 2 to 12:

- 11101111_{2}
- 22212_{3}
- 3233_{4}
- 1424_{5}
- 1035_{6}
- 461_{7}
- 357_{8}
- 285_{9}
- 239_{10}
- 1A8_{11}
- 17B_{12}

The next number with this property is 5927.

== HAKMEM entry ==
HAKMEM (incidentally AI memo 239 of the MIT AI Lab) included an item on the properties of 239, including these:

- When expressing 239 as a sum of square numbers, 4 squares are required, which is the maximum that any integer can require; it also needs the maximum number (9) of positive cubes (23 is the only other such integer), and the maximum number (19) of fourth powers.
- 239/169 is a convergent of the simple continued fraction of the square root of 2, so that 239^{2} = 2 · 169^{2} − 1.
- Related to the above, π/4 rad = 4 arctan(1/5) − arctan(1/239) = 45°.
- 239 · 4649 = 1111111, so 1/239 = 0.0041841 repeating, with period 7.
- 239 can be written as b^{n} − b^{m} − 1 for b = 2, 3, and 4, a fact evidenced by its binary representation 11101111, ternary representation 22212, and quaternary representation 3233.
- There are 239 primes < 1500.
- 239 is the largest integer n whose factorial can be written as the product of distinct factors between n + 1 and 2n, both included.
- The only solutions of the Diophantine equation y^{2} + 1 = 2x^{4} in positive integers are (x, y) = (1, 1) or (13, 239).
