= 220 (number) =

Natural number

← 219	220	221 →
- ← 220 221 222 223 224 225 226 227 228 229 →: List of numbers; Integers; ← 0 100 200 300 400 500 600 700 800 900 →
- Cardinal: two hundred twenty
- Ordinal: 220th (two hundred twentieth)
- Factorization: 2^{2} × 5 × 11
- Divisors: 1, 2, 4, 5, 10, 11, 20, 22, 44, 55, 110, 220
- Greek numeral: ΣΚ´
- Roman numeral: CCXX, ccxx
- Binary: 11011100_{2}
- Ternary: 22011_{3}
- Senary: 1004_{6}
- Octal: 334_{8}
- Duodecimal: 164_{12}
- Hexadecimal: DC_{16}

220 (two hundred [and] twenty) is the natural number following 219 and preceding 221

== In mathematics ==
It is a composite number, with its proper divisors being 1, 2, 4, 5, 10, 11, 20, 22, 44, 55 and 110, making it an amicable number with 284. Every number up to 220 may be expressed as a sum of its divisors, making 220 a practical number.

It is the sum of four consecutive primes (47 + 53 + 59 + 61). It is the smallest even number with the property that when represented as a sum of two prime numbers (per Goldbach's conjecture) both of the primes must be greater than or equal to 23. There are exactly 220 different ways of partitioning 64 = 8^{2} into a sum of square numbers.

It is a tetrahedral number, the sum of the first ten triangular numbers, and a dodecahedral number. If all of the diagonals of a regular decagon are drawn, the resulting figure will have exactly 220 regions.

It is the sum of the sums of the divisors of the first 16 positive integers.
