= 229 (number) =

← 228	229	230 →
- ← 220 221 222 223 224 225 226 227 228 229 →: List of numbers; Integers; ← 0 100 200 300 400 500 600 700 800 900 →
- Cardinal: two hundred twenty-nine
- Ordinal: 229th (two hundred twenty-ninth)
- Factorization: prime
- Prime: yes
- Greek numeral: ΣΚΘ´
- Roman numeral: CCXXIX, ccxxix
- Binary: 11100101_{2}
- Ternary: 22111_{3}
- Senary: 1021_{6}
- Octal: 345_{8}
- Duodecimal: 171_{12}
- Hexadecimal: E5_{16}

229 (two hundred [and] twenty-nine) is the natural number following 228 and preceding 230.

== In mathematics ==
It is the fiftieth prime number, and a regular prime. It is also a full reptend prime, meaning that the decimal expansion of the unit fraction 1/229 repeats periodically with as long a period as possible. With 227 it is the larger of a pair of twin primes, and it is also the start of a sequence of three consecutive squarefree numbers. It is the smallest prime that, when added to the reverse of its decimal representation, yields another prime: 229 + 922 = 1151.

There are 229 cyclic permutations of the numbers from 1 to 7 in which none of the numbers is mapped to its successor (mod 7), 229 rooted tree structures formed from nine carbon atoms, and 229 triangulations of a polygon formed by adding three vertices to each side of a triangle. There are also 229 different projective configurations of type (12_{3}12_{3}), in which twelve points and twelve lines meet with three lines through each of the points and three points on each of the lines, all of which may be realized by straight lines in the Euclidean plane.

The complete graph K_{13} has 229 crossings in its straight-line drawing with the fewest possible crossings.

== See also ==
- Area code 229, assigned to Albany, Georgia, US
- List of highways numbered 229
