= 280 (number) =

← 279	280	281 →
- ← 280 281 282 283 284 285 286 287 288 289 →: List of numbers; Integers; ← 0 100 200 300 400 500 600 700 800 900 →
- Cardinal: two hundred eighty
- Ordinal: 280th (two hundred eightieth)
- Factorization: 2^{3} × 5 × 7
- Greek numeral: ΣΠ´
- Roman numeral: CCLXXX, cclxxx
- Binary: 100011000_{2}
- Ternary: 101101_{3}
- Senary: 1144_{6}
- Octal: 430_{8}
- Duodecimal: 1B4_{12}
- Hexadecimal: 118_{16}

280 (two hundred [and] eighty) is the natural number after 279 and before 281.

== In mathematics ==
The denominator of the eighth harmonic number, 280 is an octagonal number. 280 is the smallest octagonal number that is a half of another octagonal number.

There are 280 plane trees with ten nodes. As a consequence of this, 18 people around a round table can shake hands with each other in non-crossing ways, in 280 different ways (this includes rotations).
