= 290 (number) =

← 289	290	291 →
- ← 200 210 220 230 240 250 260 270 280 290 →: List of numbers; Integers; ← 0 100 200 300 400 500 600 700 800 900 →
- Cardinal: two hundred ninety
- Ordinal: 290th (two hundred ninetieth)
- Factorization: 2 × 5 × 29
- Greek numeral: ΣϞ´
- Roman numeral: CCXC, ccxc
- Binary: 100100010_{2}
- Ternary: 101202_{3}
- Senary: 1202_{6}
- Octal: 442_{8}
- Duodecimal: 202_{12}
- Hexadecimal: 122_{16}

290 (two hundred [and] ninety) is the natural number following 289 and preceding 291.

== In mathematics ==
The product of three primes, 290 is a sphenic number, and the sum of four consecutive primes (67 + 71 + 73 + 79). The sum of the squares of the divisors of 17 is 290.

Not only is it a nontotient and a noncototient, it is also an untouchable number.

290 is the 16th member of the Mian–Chowla sequence; it can not be obtained as the sum of any two previous terms in the sequence.

See also the Bhargava–Hanke 290 theorem.
