= 270 (number) =

← 269	270	271 →
- ← 270 271 272 273 274 275 276 277 278 279 →: List of numbers; Integers; ← 0 100 200 300 400 500 600 700 800 900 →
- Cardinal: two hundred seventy
- Ordinal: 270th (two hundred seventieth)
- Factorization: 2 × 3^{3} × 5
- Divisors: 1, 2, 3, 5, 6, 9, 10, 15, 18, 27, 30, 45, 54, 90, 135, 270
- Greek numeral: ΣΟ´
- Roman numeral: CCLXX, cclxx
- Binary: 100001110_{2}
- Ternary: 101000_{3}
- Senary: 1130_{6}
- Octal: 416_{8}
- Duodecimal: 1A6_{12}
- Hexadecimal: 10E_{16}

270 (two hundred [and] seventy) is the natural number following 269 and preceding 271.

== In mathematics ==
- 270 is a harmonic divisor number.
- 270 degrees is equal to three-fourths of a turn. This also means that $270^\circ=\frac{3\pi}{2}$ radians.

== In politics ==
- In the United States electoral college, 270 is the minimum number of electors, out of 538, required for a presidential candidate to be elected to the presidency.

== In other fields ==
- 270 (meaning 270°) is an informal way of referring to 3/4 of a turn, and is used as such in some sports. For instance, Yuto Horigome won gold in street skateboarding at the 2024 Olympic Games by performing his signature trick, a "nollie 270 noseblunt slide".
