= 260 (number) =

← 259	260	261 →
- ← 260 261 262 263 264 265 266 267 268 269 →: List of numbers; Integers; ← 0 100 200 300 400 500 600 700 800 900 →
- Cardinal: two hundred sixty
- Ordinal: 260th (two hundred sixtieth)
- Factorization: 2^{2} × 5 × 13
- Greek numeral: ΣΞ´
- Roman numeral: CCLX, cclx
- Binary: 100000100_{2}
- Ternary: 100122_{3}
- Senary: 1112_{6}
- Octal: 404_{8}
- Duodecimal: 198_{12}
- Hexadecimal: 104_{16}

260 (two hundred [and] sixty) is the natural number following 259 and preceding 261.

== In mathematics ==
260 is an abundant number, an Ulam number, and a member of the Moser-de Bruijn sequence.

260 is the magic constant of the normal magic square of order 8.

== In other fields ==
Pre-Columbian Mesoamericans used 260-day calendars.
