= 230 (number) =

Natural number

← 229	230	231 →
- ← 230 231 232 233 234 235 236 237 238 239 →: List of numbers; Integers; ← 0 100 200 300 400 500 600 700 800 900 →
- Cardinal: two hundred thirty
- Ordinal: 230th (two hundred thirtieth)
- Factorization: 2 × 5 × 23
- Divisors: 1, 2, 5, 10, 23, 46, 115, 230
- Greek numeral: ΣΛ´
- Roman numeral: CCXXX, ccxxx
- Binary: 11100110_{2}
- Ternary: 22112_{3}
- Senary: 1022_{6}
- Octal: 346_{8}
- Duodecimal: 172_{12}
- Hexadecimal: E6_{16}

230 (two hundred [and] thirty) is the natural number following 229 and preceding 231.

== In mathematics ==
230 is a composite number and more specifically a sphenic number because it is the product of 3 primes. It is also the smallest sphenic number to immediately precede another sphenic number.

230 a repdigit in bases 22 (AA_{22}), 45 (55_{45}), and 114 (22_{114}). Like all repdigits, it is palindromic in these bases. It is a Harshad number in bases 2, 6, 10, 12, and 23, as well as16 other bases.

230 is a happy number.

230 is a nontotient since there is no integer with 230 coprimes below it.

230 is the aliquot sum of both 454 and 52441. The aliquot sequence starting at 224 is: 224, 280, 440, 640, 890, 730, 602, 454, 230, 202, 104, 106, 56, 64, 63, 41, 1, 0.

A maximum of 230 pieces can be obtained by cutting an annulus with 20 cuts.

There are 230 unique space groups describing all possible crystal symmetries.
