= 240 (number) =

← 239	240	241 →
- ← 240 241 242 243 244 245 246 247 248 249 →: List of numbers; Integers; ← 0 100 200 300 400 500 600 700 800 900 →
- Cardinal: two hundred forty
- Ordinal: 240th (two hundred fortieth)
- Factorization: 2^{4} × 3 × 5
- Divisors: 1, 2, 3, 4, 5, 6, 8, 10, 12, 15, 16, 20, 24, 30, 40, 48, 60, 80, 120, 240
- Greek numeral: ΣΜ´
- Roman numeral: CCXL, ccxl
- Unicode symbol: U+00F0
- Binary: 11110000_{2}
- Ternary: 22220_{3}
- Senary: 1040_{6}
- Octal: 360_{8}
- Duodecimal: 180_{12}
- Hexadecimal: F0_{16}

240 (two hundred [and] forty) is a natural number following and preceding two primes 239 and 241.

== Mathematics ==
240 is a composite number as well as a highly composite number.

240 is a pronic number being the product of 15 and 16.

240 is a abundant number.

240 is a humble number.

240° is 2/3 of a circle.

E_{8} has 240 roots.
