= 250 (number) =

← 249	250	251 →
- ← 250 251 252 253 254 255 256 257 258 259 →: List of numbers; Integers; ← 0 100 200 300 400 500 600 700 800 900 →
- Cardinal: two hundred fifty
- Ordinal: 250th (two hundred fiftieth)
- Factorization: 2 × 5^{3}
- Greek numeral: ΣΝ´
- Roman numeral: CCL, ccl
- Binary: 11111010_{2}
- Ternary: 100021_{3}
- Senary: 1054_{6}
- Octal: 372_{8}
- Duodecimal: 18A_{12}
- Hexadecimal: FA_{16}

250 (two hundred [and] fifty) is the natural number following 249 and preceding 251.

== In mathematics ==
250 is a 5-smooth number, meaning that its divisors are all less than or equal to 5. 250 is the sum of exactly two positive cube numbers, and the product of four prime numbers.

== In other fields ==
- In Chinese slang, the number 250 means 'idiot' (spelled as èr bái wǔ in pinyin; ㄦˋ ㄅㄞˇ ㄨˇ in bopomofo). The Gulfstream G280 was originally the G250, and was renamed for this reason.
- The 250th anniversary is considered important in western culture; see United States Semiquincentennial.
- Used to refer to the 250 works of art in the AP Art History curriculum
