= List of integer sequences =

This is a list of notable integer sequences with links to their entries in the On-Line Encyclopedia of Integer Sequences.

== General ==
Name	First elements	Short description	OEIS
Kolakoski sequence	1, 2, 2, 1, 1, 2, 1, 2, 2, 1, ...	The nth term describes the length of the nth run	A000002
Euler's totient function φ(n)	1, 1, 2, 2, 4, 2, 6, 4, 6, 4, ...	φ(n) is the number of positive integers not greater than n that are coprime with n.	A000010
Lucas numbers L(n)	2, 1, 3, 4, 7, 11, 18, 29, 47, 76, ...	L(n) = L(n − 1) + L(n − 2) for n ≥ 2, with L(0) = 2 and L(1) = 1.	A000032
Prime numbers p_{n}	2, 3, 5, 7, 11, 13, 17, 19, 23, 29, ...	The prime numbers p_{n}, with n ≥ 1. A prime number is a natural number greater than 1 that is not a product of two smaller natural numbers.	A000040
Partition numbers P_{n}	1, 1, 2, 3, 5, 7, 11, 15, 22, 30, 42, ...	The partition numbers, number of additive breakdowns of n.	A000041
Fibonacci numbers F(n)	0, 1, 1, 2, 3, 5, 8, 13, 21, 34, ...	F(n) = F(n − 1) + F(n − 2) for n ≥ 2, with F(0) = 0 and F(1) = 1.	A000045
Sylvester's sequence	2, 3, 7, 43, 1807, 3263443, 10650056950807, 113423713055421844361000443, ...	$a(n+1)= \prod_{k=0}^{n} a(k)+1=a(n)^2-a(n)+1$ for n ≥ 1, with a(0) = 2.	A000058
Tribonacci numbers	0, 1, 1, 2, 4, 7, 13, 24, 44, 81, ...	T(n) = T(n − 1) + T(n − 2) + T(n − 3) for n ≥ 3, with T(0) = 0 and T(1) = T(2) = 1.	A000073
Powers of 2	1, 2, 4, 8, 16, 32, 64, 128, 256, 512, 1024, ...	Powers of 2: 2^{n} for n ≥ 0	A000079
Polyominoes	1, 1, 1, 2, 5, 12, 35, 108, 369, ...	The number of free polyominoes with n cells.	A000105
Catalan numbers C_{n}	1, 1, 2, 5, 14, 42, 132, 429, 1430, 4862, ...	$C_n = \frac{1}{n+1}{2n\choose n} = \frac{(2n)!}{(n+1)!\,n!} = \prod\limits_{k=2}^{n}\frac{n+k}{k},\quad n \ge 0.$	A000108
Bell numbers B_{n}	1, 1, 2, 5, 15, 52, 203, 877, 4140, 21147, ...	B_{n} is the number of partitions of a set with n elements.	A000110
Euler zigzag numbers E_{n}	1, 1, 1, 2, 5, 16, 61, 272, 1385, 7936, ...	E_{n} is the number of linear extensions of the "zig-zag" poset.	A000111
Lazy caterer's sequence	1, 2, 4, 7, 11, 16, 22, 29, 37, 46, ...	The maximal number of pieces formed when slicing a pancake with n cuts.	A000124
Pell numbers P_{n}	0, 1, 2, 5, 12, 29, 70, 169, 408, 985, ...	a(n) = 2a(n − 1) + a(n − 2) for n ≥ 2, with a(0) = 0, a(1) = 1.	A000129
Factorials n!	1, 1, 2, 6, 24, 120, 720, 5040, 40320, 362880, ...	$n! =\prod_{k=1}^{n} k$ for n ≥ 1, with 0! = 1 (empty product).	A000142
Derangements	1, 0, 1, 2, 9, 44, 265, 1854, 14833, 133496, 1334961, 14684570, 176214841, ...	Number of permutations of n elements with no fixed points.	A000166
Divisor function σ(n)	1, 3, 4, 7, 6, 12, 8, 15, 13, 18, 12, 28, ...	σ(n) := σ_{1}(n) is the sum of divisors of a positive integer n.	A000203
Fermat numbers F_{n}	3, 5, 17, 257, 65537, 4294967297, 18446744073709551617, 340282366920938463463374607431768211457, ...	F_{n} = 2^{2^{n}} + 1 for n ≥ 0.	A000215
Polytrees	1, 1, 3, 8, 27, 91, 350, 1376, 5743, 24635, 108968, ...	Number of oriented trees with n nodes.	A000238
Perfect numbers	6, 28, 496, 8128, 33550336, 8589869056, 137438691328, 2305843008139952128, ...	n is equal to the sum s(n) = σ(n) − n of the proper divisors of n.	A000396
Ramanujan tau function	1, −24, 252, −1472, 4830, −6048, −16744, 84480, −113643, ...	Values of the Ramanujan tau function, τ(n) at n = 1, 2, 3, ...	A000594
Landau's function	1, 1, 2, 3, 4, 6, 6, 12, 15, 20, ...	The largest order of permutation of n elements.	A000793
Narayana's cows	1, 1, 1, 2, 3, 4, 6, 9, 13, 19, ...	The number of cows each year if each cow has one cow a year beginning its fourth year.	A000930
Padovan sequence	1, 1, 1, 2, 2, 3, 4, 5, 7, 9, ...	P(n) = P(n − 2) + P(n − 3) for n ≥ 3, with P(0) = P(1) = P(2) = 1.	A000931
Euclid–Mullin sequence	2, 3, 7, 43, 13, 53, 5, 6221671, 38709183810571, 139, ...	a(1) = 2; a(n + 1) is smallest prime factor of a(1) a(2) ⋯ a(n) + 1.	A000945
Lucky numbers	1, 3, 7, 9, 13, 15, 21, 25, 31, 33, ...	A natural number in a set that is filtered by a sieve.	A000959
Prime powers	2, 3, 4, 5, 7, 8, 9, 11, 13, 16, 17, 19, ...	Positive integer powers of prime numbers	A000961
Central binomial coefficients	1, 2, 6, 20, 70, 252, 924, ...	${2n \choose n} = \frac{(2n)!}{(n!)^2}\text{ for all }n \geq 0$, numbers in the center of even rows of Pascal's triangle	A000984
Motzkin numbers	1, 1, 2, 4, 9, 21, 51, 127, 323, 835, ...	The number of ways of drawing any number of nonintersecting chords joining n (labeled) points on a circle.	A001006
Jordan–Pólya numbers	1, 2, 4, 6, 8, 12, 16, 24, 32, 36, 48, 64, ...	Numbers that are the product of factorials.	A001013
Jacobsthal numbers	0, 1, 1, 3, 5, 11, 21, 43, 85, 171, 341, ...	a(n) = a(n − 1) + 2a(n − 2) for n ≥ 2, with a(0) = 0, a(1) = 1.	A001045
Sum of proper divisors s(n)	0, 1, 1, 3, 1, 6, 1, 7, 4, 8, ...	s(n) = σ(n) − n is the sum of the proper divisors of the positive integer n.	A001065
Wedderburn–Etherington numbers	0, 1, 1, 1, 2, 3, 6, 11, 23, 46, ...	The number of binary rooted trees (every node has out-degree 0 or 2) with n endpoints (and 2n − 1 nodes in all).	A001190
Gould's sequence	1, 2, 2, 4, 2, 4, 4, 8, 2, 4, 4, 8, 4, 8, 8, ...	Number of odd entries in row n of Pascal's triangle.	A001316
Semiprimes	4, 6, 9, 10, 14, 15, 21, 22, 25, 26, ...	Products of two primes, not necessarily distinct.	A001358
Golomb sequence	1, 2, 2, 3, 3, 4, 4, 4, 5, 5, ...	a(n) is the number of times n occurs, starting with a(1) = 1.	A001462
Perrin numbers P_{n}	3, 0, 2, 3, 2, 5, 5, 7, 10, 12, ...	P(n) = P(n − 2) + P(n − 3) for n ≥ 3, with P(0) = 3, P(1) = 0, P(2) = 2.	A001608
Sorting number	0, 1, 3, 5, 8, 11, 14, 17, 21, 25, 29, 33, 37, 41, 45, 49, ...	Used in the analysis of comparison sorts.	A001855
Cullen numbers C_{n}	1, 3, 9, 25, 65, 161, 385, 897, 2049, 4609, 10241, 22529, 49153, 106497, ...	C_{n} = n⋅2^{n} + 1, with n ≥ 0.	A002064
Primorials p_{n}#	1, 2, 6, 30, 210, 2310, 30030, 510510, 9699690, 223092870, ...	p_{n}#, the product of the first n primes.	A002110
Highly composite numbers	1, 2, 4, 6, 12, 24, 36, 48, 60, 120, ...	A positive integer with more divisors than any smaller positive integer.	A002182
Superior highly composite numbers	2, 6, 12, 60, 120, 360, 2520, 5040, 55440, 720720, ...	A positive integer n for which there is an e > 0 such that d(n)/n^{e} ≥ d(k)/k^{e} for all k > 1.	A002201
Pronic numbers	0, 2, 6, 12, 20, 30, 42, 56, 72, 90, ...	a(n) = 2t(n) = n(n + 1), with n ≥ 0 where t(n) are the triangular numbers.	A002378
Markov numbers	1, 2, 5, 13, 29, 34, 89, 169, 194, ...	Positive integer solutions of x^{2} + y^{2} + z^{2} = 3xyz.	A002559
Composite numbers	4, 6, 8, 9, 10, 12, 14, 15, 16, 18, ...	The numbers n of the form xy for x > 1 and y > 1.	A002808
Ulam number	1, 2, 3, 4, 6, 8, 11, 13, 16, 18, ...	a(1) = 1; a(2) = 2; for n > 2, a(n) is least number > a(n − 1) which is a unique sum of two distinct earlier terms; semiperfect.	A002858
Prime knots	0, 0, 1, 1, 2, 3, 7, 21, 49, 165, 552, 2176, 9988, ...	The number of prime knots with n crossings.	A002863
Carmichael numbers	561, 1105, 1729, 2465, 2821, 6601, 8911, 10585, 15841, 29341, ...	Composite numbers n such that a^{n − 1} ≡ 1 (mod n) if a is coprime with n.	A002997
Woodall numbers	1, 7, 23, 63, 159, 383, 895, 2047, 4607, ...	n⋅2^{n} − 1, with n ≥ 1.	A003261
Arithmetic numbers	1, 3, 5, 6, 7, 11, 13, 14, 15, 17, 19, 20, 21, 22, 23, 27, ...	An integer for which the average of its positive divisors is also an integer.	A003601
Colossally abundant numbers	2, 6, 12, 60, 120, 360, 2520, 5040, 55440, 720720, ...	A number n is colossally abundant if there is an ε > 0 such that for all k > 1, $$\frac{\sigma(n)}{n^{1+\varepsilon}}\geq\frac{\sigma(k)}{k^{1+\varepsilon}},$$ where σ denotes the sum-of-divisors function.	A004490
Alcuin's sequence	0, 0, 0, 1, 0, 1, 1, 2, 1, 3, 2, 4, 3, 5, 4, 7, 5, 8, 7, 10, 8, 12, 10, 14, ...	Number of triangles with integer sides and perimeter n.	A005044
Deficient numbers	1, 2, 3, 4, 5, 7, 8, 9, 10, 11, ...	Positive integers n such that σ(n) < 2n.	A005100
Abundant numbers	12, 18, 20, 24, 30, 36, 40, 42, 48, 54, ...	Positive integers n such that σ(n) > 2n.	A005101
Untouchable numbers	2, 5, 52, 88, 96, 120, 124, 146, 162, 188, ...	Cannot be expressed as the sum of all the proper divisors of any positive integer.	A005114
Recamán's sequence	0, 1, 3, 6, 2, 7, 13, 20, 12, 21, 11, 22, 10, 23, 9, 24, 8, 25, 43, 62, ...	"subtract if possible, otherwise add": a(0) = 0; for n > 0, a(n) = a(n − 1) − n if that number is positive and not already in the sequence, otherwise a(n) = a(n − 1) + n, whether or not that number is already in the sequence.	A005132
Look-and-say sequence	1, 11, 21, 1211, 111221, 312211, 13112221, 1113213211, 31131211131221, 13211311123113112211, ...	A = 'frequency' followed by 'digit'-indication.	A005150
Practical numbers	1, 2, 4, 6, 8, 12, 16, 18, 20, 24, 28, 30, 32, 36, 40, ...	All smaller positive integers can be represented as sums of distinct factors of the number.	A005153
Alternating factorial	1, 1, 5, 19, 101, 619, 4421, 35899, 326981, 3301819, 36614981, 442386619, 5784634181, 81393657019, ...	$\sum_{k=0}^{n-1} (-1)^k (n-k)!$	A005165
Fortunate numbers	3, 5, 7, 13, 23, 17, 19, 23, 37, 61, ...	The smallest integer m > 1 such that p_{n}# + m is a prime number, where the primorial p_{n}# is the product of the first n prime numbers.	A005235
Semiperfect numbers	6, 12, 18, 20, 24, 28, 30, 36, 40, 42, ...	A natural number n that is equal to the sum of all or some of its proper divisors.	A005835
Magic constants	15, 34, 65, 111, 175, 260, 369, 505, 671, 870, 1105, 1379, 1695, 2056, ...	Sum of numbers in any row, column, or diagonal of a magic square of order n ≥ 3.	A006003
Weird numbers	70, 836, 4030, 5830, 7192, 7912, 9272, 10430, 10570, 10792, ...	A natural number that is abundant but not semiperfect.	A006037
Farey sequence numerators	0, 1, 0, 1, 1, 0, 1, 1, 2, 1, ...		A006842
Farey sequence denominators	1, 1, 1, 2, 1, 1, 3, 2, 3, 1, ...		A006843
Euclid numbers	2, 3, 7, 31, 211, 2311, 30031, 510511, 9699691, 223092871, ...	p_{n}# + 1, i.e. 1 + product of first n consecutive primes.	A006862
Kaprekar numbers	1, 9, 45, 55, 99, 297, 703, 999, 2223, 2728, ...	X^{2} = Ab^{n} + B, where 0 < B < b^{n} and X = A + B.	A006886
Sphenic numbers	30, 42, 66, 70, 78, 102, 105, 110, 114, 130, ...	Products of 3 distinct primes.	A007304
Giuga numbers	30, 858, 1722, 66198, 2214408306, ...	Composite numbers so that for each of its distinct prime factors p_{i} we have $p_i^2 \,|\, (n - p_i)$.	A007850
Radical of an integer	1, 2, 3, 2, 5, 6, 7, 2, 3, 10, ...	The radical of a positive integer n is the product of the distinct prime numbers dividing n.	A007947
Thue–Morse sequence	0, 1, 1, 0, 1, 0, 0, 1, 1, 0, ...		A010060
Regular paperfolding sequence	1, 1, 0, 1, 1, 0, 0, 1, 1, 1, ...	At each stage an alternating sequence of 1s and 0s is inserted between the terms of the previous sequence.	A014577
Blum integers	21, 33, 57, 69, 77, 93, 129, 133, 141, 161, 177, ...	Numbers of the form pq where p and q are distinct primes congruent to 3 (mod 4).	A016105
Magic numbers	2, 8, 20, 28, 50, 82, 126, ...	A number of nucleons (either protons or neutrons) such that they are arranged into complete shells within the atomic nucleus.	A018226
Superperfect numbers	2, 4, 16, 64, 4096, 65536, 262144, 1073741824, 1152921504606846976, 309485009821345068724781056, ...	Positive integers n for which σ^{2}(n) = σ(σ(n)) = 2n.	A019279
Bernoulli numbers B_{n}	1, −1, 1, 0, −1, 0, 1, 0, −1, 0, 5, 0, −691, 0, 7, 0, −3617, 0, 43867, 0, ...		A027641
Hyperperfect numbers	6, 21, 28, 301, 325, 496, 697, ...	k-hyperperfect numbers, i.e. n for which the equality n = 1 + k (σ(n) − n − 1) holds.	A034897
Achilles numbers	72, 108, 200, 288, 392, 432, 500, 648, 675, 800, ...	Positive integers which are powerful but imperfect.	A052486
Primary pseudoperfect numbers	2, 6, 42, 1806, 47058, 2214502422, 52495396602, ...	Satisfies a certain Egyptian fraction.	A054377
Erdős–Woods numbers	16, 22, 34, 36, 46, 56, 64, 66, 70, 76, 78, 86, 88, ...	The length of an interval of consecutive integers with property that every element has a factor in common with one of the endpoints.	A059756
Sierpinski numbers	78557, 271129, 271577, 322523, 327739, 482719, 575041, 603713, 903983, 934909, ...	Odd k for which { k⋅2^{n} + 1 : n ∈ $\mathbb{N}$ } consists only of composite numbers.	A076336
Riesel numbers	509203, 762701, 777149, 790841, 992077, ...	Odd k for which { k⋅2^{n} − 1 : n ∈ $\mathbb{N}$ } consists only of composite numbers.	A076337
Baum–Sweet sequence	1, 1, 0, 1, 1, 0, 0, 1, 0, 1, ...	a(n) = 1 if the binary representation of n contains no block of consecutive zeros of odd length; otherwise a(n) = 0.	A086747
Gijswijt's sequence	1, 1, 2, 1, 1, 2, 2, 2, 3, 1, ...	The nth term counts the maximal number of repeated blocks at the end of the subsequence from 1 to n−1	A090822
Carol numbers	−1, 7, 47, 223, 959, 3967, 16127, 65023, 261119, 1046527, ...	$a(n) = (2^n - 1)^2 - 2.$	A093112
Juggler sequence	0, 1, 1, 5, 2, 11, 2, 18, 2, 27, ...	If n ≡ 0 (mod 2) then ⌊√n⌋ else ⌊n^{3/2}⌋.	A094683
Highly totient numbers	1, 2, 4, 8, 12, 24, 48, 72, 144, 240, ...	Each number k on this list has more solutions to the equation φ(x) = k than any preceding k.	A097942
Euler numbers	1, 0, −1, 0, 5, 0, −61, 0, 1385, 0, ...	$\frac{1}{\cosh t} = \frac{2}{e^{t} + e^ {-t} } = \sum_{n=0}^\infty \frac{E_n}{n!} \cdot t^n.$	A122045
Polite numbers	3, 5, 6, 7, 9, 10, 11, 12, 13, 14, 15, 17, ...	A positive integer that can be written as the sum of two or more consecutive positive integers.	A138591
Erdős–Nicolas numbers	24, 2016, 8190, 42336, 45864, 392448, 714240, 1571328, ...	A number n such that there exists another number m and $\sum_{d \mid n,\ d \leq m}\!d = n.$	A194472
Solution to Stepping Stone Puzzle	1, 16, 28, 38, 49, 60, ...	The maximal value a(n) of the stepping stone puzzle	A337663

== Figurate numbers ==
Name	First elements	Short description	OEIS
Natural numbers	1, 2, 3, 4, 5, 6, 7, 8, 9, 10, ...	The natural numbers (positive integers) n ∈ $\mathbb{N}$.	A000027
Triangular numbers t(n)	0, 1, 3, 6, 10, 15, 21, 28, 36, 45, ...	t(n) = C(n + 1, 2) = (n(n + 1))/2 = 1 + 2 + ... + n for n ≥ 1, with t(0) = 0 (empty sum).	A000217
Square numbers n^{2}	0, 1, 4, 9, 16, 25, 36, 49, 64, 81, ...	n^{2} = n × n	A000290
Tetrahedral numbers T(n)	0, 1, 4, 10, 20, 35, 56, 84, 120, 165, ...	T(n) is the sum of the first n triangular numbers, with T(0) = 0 (empty sum).	A000292
Square pyramidal numbers	0, 1, 5, 14, 30, 55, 91, 140, 204, 285, ...	(n(n + 1)(2n + 1))/6 : The number of stacked spheres in a pyramid with a square base.	A000330
Cube numbers n^{3}	0, 1, 8, 27, 64, 125, 216, 343, 512, 729, ...	n^{3} = n × n × n	A000578
Fifth powers	0, 1, 32, 243, 1024, 3125, 7776, 16807, 32768, 59049, 100000, ...	n^{5}	A000584
Star numbers	1, 13, 37, 73, 121, 181, 253, 337, 433, 541, 661, 793, 937, ...	S_{n} = 6n(n − 1) + 1.	A003154
Stella octangula numbers	0, 1, 14, 51, 124, 245, 426, 679, 1016, 1449, 1990, 2651, 3444, 4381, ...	Stella octangula numbers: n(2n^{2} − 1), with n ≥ 0.	A007588

== Types of primes ==
Name	First elements	Short description	OEIS
Mersenne prime exponents	2, 3, 5, 7, 13, 17, 19, 31, 61, 89, ...	Primes p such that 2^{p} − 1 is prime.	A000043
Mersenne primes	3, 7, 31, 127, 8191, 131071, 524287, 2147483647, 2305843009213693951, 618970019642690137449562111, ...	2^{p} − 1 is prime, where p is a prime.	A000668
Wagstaff primes	3, 11, 43, 683, 2731, 43691, ...	A prime number p of the form $p={{2^q+1}\over 3}$ where q is an odd prime.	A000979
Wieferich primes	1093, 3511	Primes $p$ satisfying 2^{p−1} ≡ 1 (mod p^{2}).	A001220
Sophie Germain primes	2, 3, 5, 11, 23, 29, 41, 53, 83, 89, ...	A prime number p such that 2p + 1 is also prime.	A005384
Wilson primes	5, 13, 563	Primes $p$ satisfying (p−1)! ≡ −1 (mod p^{2}).	A007540
Happy numbers	1, 7, 10, 13, 19, 23, 28, 31, 32, 44, ...	The numbers whose trajectory under iteration of sum of squares of digits map includes 1.	A007770
Factorial primes	2, 3, 5, 7, 23, 719, 5039, 39916801, ...	A prime number that is one less or one more than a factorial (all factorials > 1 are even).	A088054
Wolstenholme primes	16843, 2124679	Primes $p$ satisfying ${2p-1 \choose p-1} \equiv 1 \pmod{p^4}$.	A088164
Ramanujan primes	2, 11, 17, 29, 41, 47, 59, 67, ...	The n^{th} Ramanujan prime is the least integer R_{n} for which π(x) − π(x/2) ≥ n, for all x ≥ R_{n}.	A104272

== Base-dependent ==
Name	First elements	Short description	OEIS
Aronson's sequence	1, 4, 11, 16, 24, 29, 33, 35, 39, 45, ...	"t" is the first, fourth, eleventh, ... letter in this sentence, not counting spaces or commas.	A005224
Palindromic numbers	0, 1, 2, 3, 4, 5, 6, 7, 8, 9, 11, 22, 33, 44, 55, 66, 77, 88, 99, 101, 111, 121, ...	A number that remains the same when its digits are reversed.	A002113
Permutable primes	2, 3, 5, 7, 11, 13, 17, 31, 37, 71, ...	The numbers for which every permutation of digits is a prime.	A003459
Harshad numbers in base 10	1, 2, 3, 4, 5, 6, 7, 8, 9, 10, 12, ...	A Harshad number in base 10 is an integer that is divisible by the sum of its digits (when written in base 10).	A005349
Factorions	1, 2, 145, 40585, ...	A natural number that equals the sum of the factorials of its decimal digits.	A014080
Circular primes	2, 3, 5, 7, 11, 13, 17, 37, 79, 113, ...	The numbers which remain prime under cyclic shifts of digits.	A016114
Home prime	1, 2, 3, 211, 5, 23, 7, 3331113965338635107, 311, 773, ...	For n ≥ 2, a(n) is the prime that is finally reached when you start with n, concatenate its prime factors (A037276) and repeat until a prime is reached; a(n) = −1 if no prime is ever reached.	A037274
Undulating numbers	101, 121, 131, 141, 151, 161, 171, 181, 191, 202, ...	A number that has the digit form ababab.	A046075
Equidigital numbers	1, 2, 3, 5, 7, 10, 11, 13, 14, 15, 16, 17, 19, 21, 23, 25, 27, 29, 31, 32, 35, 37, 41, 43, 47, 49, 53, 59, 61, 64, ...	A number that has the same number of digits as the number of digits in its prime factorization, including exponents but excluding exponents equal to 1.	A046758
Extravagant numbers	4, 6, 8, 9, 12, 18, 20, 22, 24, 26, 28, 30, 33, 34, 36, 38, ...	A number that has fewer digits than the number of digits in its prime factorization (including exponents).	A046760
Pandigital numbers	1023456789, 1023456798, 1023456879, 1023456897, 1023456978, 1023456987, 1023457689, 1023457698, 1023457869, 1023457896, ...	Numbers containing the digits 0–9 such that each digit appears exactly once.	A050278
