= Integer sequence =

Ordered list of whole numbers

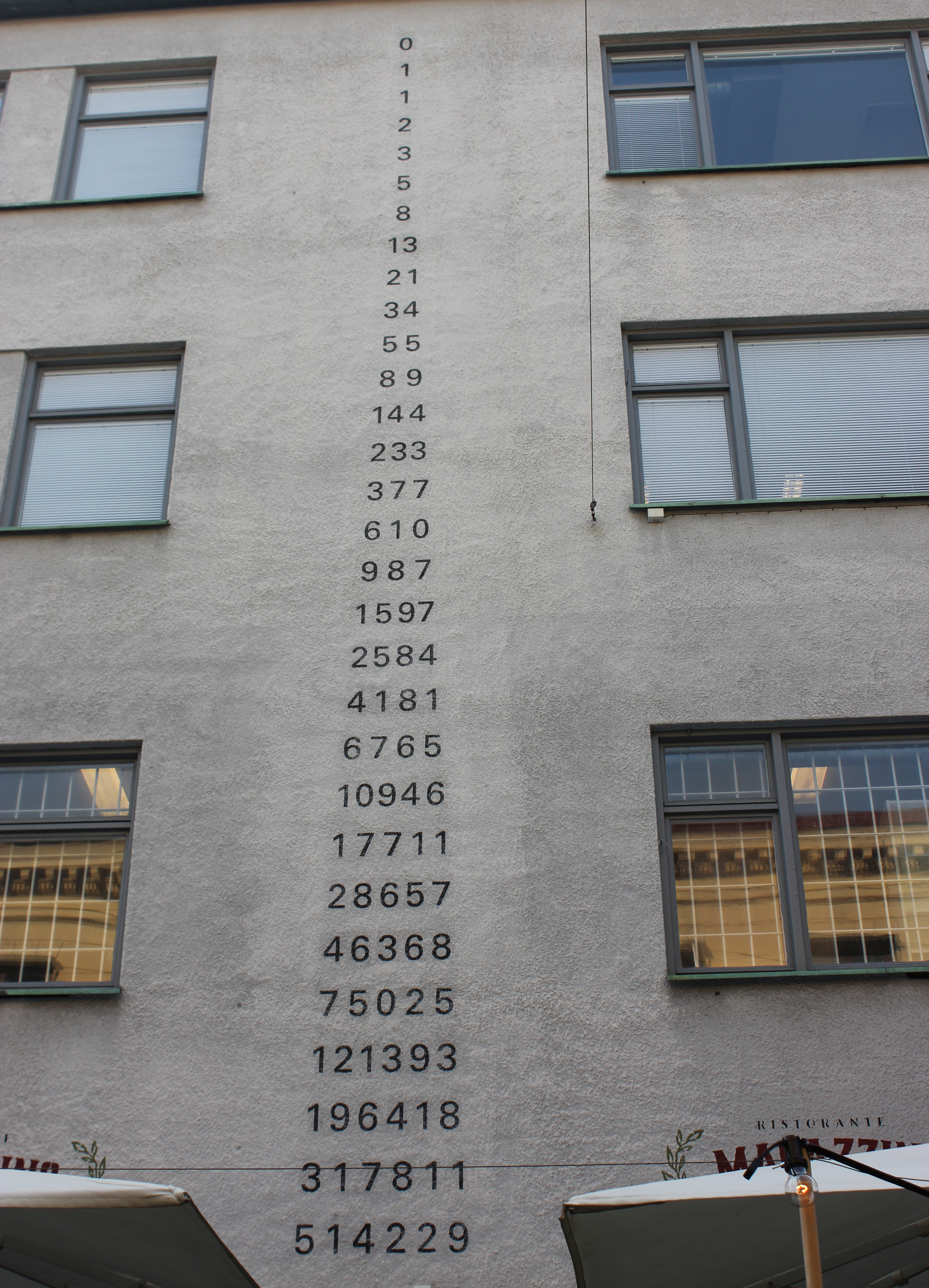
Beginning of the Fibonacci sequence on a building in Gothenburg

In mathematics, an integer sequence is a sequence (i.e., an ordered list) of integers.

An integer sequence may be specified explicitly by giving a formula for its nth term, or implicitly by giving a relationship between its terms. For example, the sequence 0, 1, 1, 2, 3, 5, 8, 13, ... (the Fibonacci sequence) is formed by starting with 0 and 1 and then adding any two consecutive terms to obtain the next one: an implicit description (sequence A000045 in the OEIS). The sequence 0, 3, 8, 15, ... is formed according to the formula $n^2-1$ for the nth term: an explicit definition.

Alternatively, an integer sequence may be defined by a property which members of the sequence possess and other integers do not possess. For example, we can determine whether a given integer is a perfect number, (sequence A000396 in the OEIS), even though we do not have a formula for the nth perfect number.

== Computable and definable sequences ==
An integer sequence is computable if there exists an algorithm that, given $n$, calculates $a_n$, for all $n>0$. The set of computable integer sequences is countable. The set of all integer sequences is uncountable (with cardinality equal to that of the continuum), and so not all integer sequences are computable.

Although some integer sequences have definitions, there is no systematic way to define what it means for an integer sequence to be definable in the universe or in any absolute (model independent) sense.

Suppose the set $M$ is a transitive model of ZFC set theory. The transitivity of $M$ implies that the integers and integer sequences inside $M$ are actually integers and sequences of integers. An integer sequence is a definable sequence relative to $M$ if there exists some formula $P(x)$ in the language of set theory, with one free variable and no parameters, which is true in $M$ for that integer sequence and false in $M$ for all other integer sequences. In each such $M$, there are definable integer sequences that are not computable, such as sequences that encode the Turing jumps of computable sets.

For some transitive models $M$ of ZFC, every sequence of integers in $M$ is definable relative to $M$; for others, only some integer sequences are. There is no systematic way to define in $M$ itself the set of sequences definable relative to $M$ and that set may not even exist in some such $M$. Similarly, the map from the set of formulas that define integer sequences in $M$ to the integer sequences they define is not definable in $M$ and may not exist in $M$. However, in any model that does possess such a definability map, some integer sequences in the model will not be definable relative to the model.

If $M$ contains all integer sequences, then the set of integer sequences definable in $M$ will exist in $M$ and be countable and countable in $M$.

== Complete sequences ==
A sequence of positive integers is called a complete sequence if every positive integer can be expressed as a sum of values in the sequence, using each value at most once.

== Examples ==
Integer sequences that have their own name include:

- Abundant numbers
- Baum–Sweet sequence
- Bell numbers
- Binomial coefficients
- Carmichael numbers
- Catalan numbers
- Composite numbers
- Deficient numbers
- Euler numbers
- Even and odd numbers
- Factorial numbers
- Fibonacci numbers
- Fibonacci word
- Figurate numbers
- Golomb sequence
- Happy numbers
- Highly composite numbers
- Highly totient numbers
- Home primes
- Hyperperfect numbers
- Juggler sequence
- Kolakoski sequence
- Lucky numbers
- Lucas numbers
- Motzkin numbers
- Natural numbers
- Padovan numbers
- Partition numbers
- Perfect numbers
- Practical numbers
- Prime numbers
- Pseudoprime numbers
- Recamán's sequence
- Regular paperfolding sequence
- Rudin–Shapiro sequence
- Semiperfect numbers
- Semiprime numbers
- Superperfect numbers
- Triangular numbers
- Thue–Morse sequence
- Ulam numbers
- Weird numbers
- Wolstenholme number

== See also ==
- Constant-recursive sequence
- On-Line Encyclopedia of Integer Sequences
- List of integer sequences
