= Sequence =

Finite or infinite ordered list of elements

A part of an infinite sequence of real numbers (in blue), indexed by a natural number n. This sequence is neither increasing, decreasing, convergent, nor Cauchy. It is, however, bounded (by red dashed lines).

In mathematics, a sequence is a collection of objects possibly with repetition, that come in a specified order. Like a set, it contains members (also called elements, or terms). Unlike a set, the same elements can appear multiple times at different positions in a sequence, and unlike a set, the order does matter. The notion of a sequence can be generalized to an indexed family, defined as a function from an arbitrary index set.

For example, (M, A, R, Y) is a sequence of letters with the letter "M" first and "Y" last. This sequence differs from (A, R, M, Y). Also, the sequence (1, 1, 2, 3, 5, 8), which contains the number 1 at two different positions, is a valid sequence. Sequences can be finite, as in these examples, or infinite, such as the sequence of positive even integers (2, 4, 6, 8, ...).

The length of a finite sequence is defined as the number of elements in the sequence. The position of an element in a sequence is its rank or index; it is the natural number for which the element is the image. The first element typically has index 0 or 1. In mathematical analysis, a sequence is often denoted by letters in the form of $a_n$, $b_n$ and $c_n$, where the subscript n refers to the nth element of the sequence; for example, the nth element of the Fibonacci sequence $F$ is generally denoted as $F_n$.

In computing and computer science, finite sequences are usually called strings, words or lists, with the specific technical term chosen depending on the type of object the sequence enumerates and the different ways to represent the sequence in computer memory. Infinite sequences are called streams.

The empty sequence ( ) is included in most notions of sequence. It may be excluded depending on the context.

== Examples and notation ==
A sequence can be thought of as a list of elements with a particular order. Sequences are useful in a number of mathematical disciplines for studying functions, spaces, and other mathematical structures using the convergence properties of sequences. In particular, sequences are the basis for series, which are important in differential equations and analysis. Sequences are also of interest in their own right, and can be studied as patterns or puzzles, such as in the study of prime numbers.

There are a number of ways to denote a sequence, some of which are more useful for specific types of sequences. One way to specify a sequence is to list all its elements. For example, the first four odd integers form the sequence (1, 3, 5, 7). This notation is used for infinite sequences as well. For instance, the infinite sequence of positive odd integers is written as (1, 3, 5, 7, ...). Because notating sequences with ellipsis leads to ambiguity, listing is most useful for customary infinite sequences which can be easily recognized from their first few elements. Other ways of denoting a sequence are discussed after the examples.

=== Examples ===
A tiling with squares whose sides are successive Fibonacci numbers in length.

A prime number is a natural number greater than 1 that has no divisors except 1 and itself. Listing the prime numbers in their natural order gives the sequence (2, 3, 5, 7, 11, 13, 17, ...). The prime numbers are widely used in mathematics, particularly in number theory where many results related to them exist.

The Fibonacci numbers are a sequence for which each element is the sum of the previous two elements. The zeroth and first elements are 0 and 1, so the sequence is (0, 1, 1, 2, 3, 5, 8, 13, ...).

Other sequences have rational numbers as elements. The sequence (.9, .99, .999, .9999, ...), for instance, approaches the number 1. As another example, π is the limit of the sequence (3, 3.1, 3.14, 3.141, 3.1415, ...), which is increasing. In fact, every real number can be written as the limit of a sequence of rational numbers (e.g. via its decimal expansion, also see completeness of the real numbers). A related type of sequence consists of the decimal digits of a real number, for example the sequence of digits of π, (3, 1, 4, 1, 5, 9, ...). This sequence does not have any pattern that is easily discernible by inspection.

The elements of a sequence can be functions instead of numbers. For example, the monomial basis for polynomials of a single variable forms the sequence $(x \mapsto 1, x \mapsto x, x \mapsto x^2, x \mapsto x^3, \ldots)$, using arrow notation.

The On-Line Encyclopedia of Integer Sequences comprises a large list of examples of integer sequences.

=== Indexing ===
Other notations can be useful for sequences whose pattern cannot be easily guessed or for sequences that do not have a pattern, such as the digits of π. One such notation is to write down a general formula for computing the nth term as a function of n, enclose it in parentheses, and include a subscript indicating the set of values that n can take. For example, in this notation the sequence of even integers could be written as $(2n)_{n\in\N}$, where $\N$ denotes the set of natural numbers. The sequence of square numbers could be written as $(n^2)_{n\in\N}$. The variable n is called an index, and the set of values that it can take is called the index set.

It is often useful to combine this notation with the technique of treating the elements of a sequence as individual variables. This yields expressions like $(a_n)_{n\in\N}$, which denotes a sequence whose nth element is given by the variable $a_n$. For example:

$$\begin{align}
a_1 &= 1\text{st element of }(a_n)_{n\in\N} \\
a_2 &= 2\text{nd element } \\
a_3 &= 3\text{rd element } \\
&\;\;\vdots \\
a_{n-1} &= (n-1)\text{th element} \\
a_n &= n\text{th element} \\
a_{n+1} &= (n+1)\text{th element} \\
&\;\; \vdots
\end{align}$$

One can consider multiple sequences at the same time by using different variables; e.g. $(b_n)_{n\in\N}$ could be a different sequence than $(a_n)_{n\in\N}$. One can even consider a sequence of sequences: $\bigl((a_{m, n})_{n\in\N}\bigr)_{m\in\N}$ denotes a sequence whose mth term is the sequence $(a_{m, n})_{n\in\N}$.

An alternative to writing the domain of a sequence in the subscript is to indicate the range of values that the index can take by listing its highest and lowest legal values. For example, the notation $(k^2){\vphantom)}_{k = 1}^{10}$ denotes the ten-term sequence of squares $(1, 4, 9, \ldots, 100)$. Using the symbol $\infty$ as an upper limit means that the indices continue infinitely. For example, the notations ${(2n-1)}_{n = 1}^\infty$ and $(2n-1)_{n\in\N}$ both describe the sequence of odd integers (1, 3, 5, ...).

A bi-infinite sequence is a sequence indexed by $\Z$, the set of all integers, and therefore continues infinitely in both negative and positive directions. Such a sequence can be written as $(\ldots, a_{-1}, a_0, a_1, a_2, \ldots)$, ${(a_n)}_{n \in \Z}$, or ${(a_n)}_{n = -\infty}^\infty$.

In cases where the set of indexing numbers is understood, the subscripts and superscripts are often left off. That is, one simply writes $(a_n)$ for an arbitrary sequence. Typically the index n is then understood to run over all natural numbers starting from 1, or sometimes over all non-negative integers starting from 0.

=== Defining a sequence by recursion ===
Sequences whose elements are related to the previous elements in a straightforward way are often defined using recursion. This is in contrast to the definition of sequences of elements as functions of their positions.

To define a sequence by recursion, one needs a rule, called recurrence relation to construct each element in terms of the ones before it. In addition, enough initial elements must be provided so that all subsequent elements of the sequence can be computed by successive applications of the recurrence relation.

The Fibonacci sequence is a simple classical example, defined by the recurrence relation

$$a_n = a_{n-1} + a_{n-2},$$

with initial terms $a_0 = 0$ and $a_1 = 1$. The first several terms can be simply computed as (0, 1, 1, 2, 3, 5, 8, 13, ...).

A complicated example of a sequence defined by a recurrence relation is Recamán's sequence, defined by the recurrence relation

$$\begin{cases}
a_n = a_{n-1} - n,\quad \text{if the result is positive and not already in the previous terms,}\\
a_n = a_{n-1} + n, \quad\text{otherwise},
\end{cases}$$

with initial term $a_0 = 0.$

A linear recurrence with constant coefficients is a recurrence relation of the form

$$a_n=c_0 +c_1a_{n-1}+\dots+c_k a_{n-k},$$

where $c_0,\dots, c_k$ are constants. There is a general method for expressing the general term $a_n$ of such a sequence as a function of n; see Linear recurrence. In the case of the Fibonacci sequence, one has $c_0=0, c_1=c_2=1,$ and the resulting function of n is given by Binet's formula.

A holonomic sequence is a sequence defined by a recurrence relation of the form

$$a_n=c_1a_{n-1}+\dots+c_k a_{n-k},$$

where $c_1,\dots, c_k$ are polynomials in n. For most holonomic sequences, there is no explicit formula for expressing $a_n$ as a function of n. Nevertheless, holonomic sequences play an important role in various areas of mathematics. For example, many special functions have a Taylor series whose sequence of coefficients is holonomic. The use of the recurrence relation allows a fast computation of values of such special functions.

Not all sequences can be specified by a recurrence relation. An example is the sequence of prime numbers in their natural order (2, 3, 5, 7, 11, 13, 17, ...).

== Formal definition and basic properties ==
=== Definition ===
Formally, a sequence can be defined as a function whose domain is an interval of integers. The elements of the domain are the positions or indices of the elements in the sequence, while the values taken by the function are the elements of the sequence. The interval can be finite or infinite; thus, this definition covers several different uses of the word "sequence", including one-sided infinite sequences, bi-infinite sequences, and finite sequences (see below for definitions of these kinds of sequences). In some contexts, the codomain of the sequence (the possible values of the terms) is fixed by context, for example by requiring it to be the set $\R$ of real numbers, the set $\C$ of complex numbers, or a topological space.

Although sequences are a type of function, they are usually distinguished notationally from functions in that the input is written as a subscript rather than in parentheses, that is, a_{n} rather than a(n). There are terminological differences as well: the value of a sequence at the lowest input (often 1) is called the "first element" of the sequence, the value at the second smallest input (often 2) is called the "second element", etc. Also, while a function abstracted from its input is usually denoted by a single letter (such as f), a sequence abstracted from its input is usually written by a notation such as $(a_n)_{n\in A}$, or just as $(a_n).$ Here A is the domain, or index set, of the sequence.

=== Finite and infinite ===
The length of a sequence is defined as the number of terms in the sequence.

A sequence of a finite length is a finite sequence. A finite sequence of length n is also called an n-tuple. Finite sequences include the empty sequence, denoted ( ), that has no elements.

Normally, the term infinite sequence refers to a sequence that is infinite in one direction, and finite in the other; such a sequence has a first element, but no final element, and are called singly infinite sequence or a one-sided infinite sequence when disambiguation is needed. In contrast, a sequence that is infinite in both directions—i.e. that has neither a first nor a final element—is called a bi-infinite sequence, two-way infinite sequence, or doubly infinite sequence. A function from $\Z$ the set of all integers, into a set, for example the sequence of all even integers (..., −4, −2, 0, 2, 4, 6, 8, ...), is bi-infinite. This sequence could be denoted ${(2n)}_{n=-\infty}^{\infty}$.

=== Increasing and decreasing ===
A sequence is said to be monotonically increasing if each term is greater than or equal to the one before it. For example, the sequence ${(a_n)}_{n=1}^{\infty}$ is monotonically increasing if and only if $a_{n+1} \geq a_n$ for all $n \in \N.$ If each consecutive term is strictly greater than (>) the previous term then the sequence is called strictly monotonically increasing. A sequence is monotonically decreasing if each consecutive term is less than or equal to the previous one, and is strictly monotonically decreasing if each is strictly less than the previous. If a sequence is either increasing or decreasing it is called a monotone sequence. This is a special case of the more general notion of a monotonic function.

The terms nondecreasing and nonincreasing are often used in place of increasing and decreasing in order to avoid any possible confusion with strictly increasing and strictly decreasing, respectively.

=== Bounded ===
If the sequence of real numbers (a_{n}) is such that all the terms are less than some real number M, then the sequence is said to be bounded from above. In other words, this means that there exists M such that for all n, a_{n} ≤ M. Any such M is called an upper bound. Likewise, if, for some real m, a_{n} ≥ m for all n greater than some N, then the sequence is bounded from below and any such m is called a lower bound. If a sequence is both bounded from above and bounded from below, then the sequence is said to be bounded.

=== Subsequences ===
A subsequence of a given sequence is a sequence formed from the given sequence by deleting some of the elements without disturbing the relative positions of the remaining elements. For instance, the sequence of positive even integers (2, 4, 6, ...) is a subsequence of the positive integers (1, 2, 3, ...). The positions of some elements change when other elements are deleted. However, the relative positions are preserved.

Formally, a subsequence of the sequence $(a_n)_{n\in\N}$ is any sequence of the form $(a_{n_k})_{k\in\N}$, where $(n_k)_{k\in\N}$ is a strictly increasing sequence of positive integers.

=== Other types of sequences ===
Some other types of sequences that are easy to define include:

- An integer sequence is a sequence whose terms are integers.
- A polynomial sequence is a sequence whose terms are polynomials.
- A positive integer sequence is sometimes called multiplicative, if a_{nm} = a_{n} a_{m} for all pairs n, m such that n and m are coprime. In other instances, sequences are often called multiplicative, if a_{n} = na_{1} for all n. Moreover, a multiplicative Fibonacci sequence satisfies the recursion relation a_{n} = a_{n−1} a_{n−2}.
- A binary sequence is a sequence whose terms have one of two discrete values, e.g. base 2 values (0, 1, 1, 0, ...), a series of coin tosses (Heads/Tails) (H, T, H, H, T, ...), the answers to a set of True or False questions (T, F, T, T, ...), and so on.

== Limits and convergence ==
The plot of a convergent sequence (a_{n}) is shown in blue. From the graph we can see that the sequence is converging to the limit zero as n increases.

An important property of a sequence is convergence. If a sequence converges, it converges to a particular value known as the limit. If a sequence converges to some limit, then it is convergent. A sequence that does not converge is divergent.

Informally, a sequence has a limit if the elements of the sequence become closer and closer to some value $L$ (called the limit of the sequence), and they become and remain arbitrarily close to $L$, meaning that given a real number $d$ greater than zero, all but a finite number of the elements of the sequence have a distance from $L$ less than $d$.

For example, the sequence $a_n = \frac{n+1}{2n^2}$ shown to the right converges to the value 0. On the other hand, the sequences $b_n = n^3$ (which begins 1, 8, 27, ...) and $c_n = (-1)^n$ (which begins −1, 1, −1, 1, ...) are both divergent.

If a sequence converges, then the value it converges to is unique. This value is called the limit of the sequence. The limit of a convergent sequence $(a_n)$ is normally denoted $\lim_{n\to\infty}a_n$. If $(a_n)$ is a divergent sequence, then the expression $\lim_{n\to\infty}a_n$ is meaningless.

=== Formal definition of convergence ===
A sequence of real numbers $(a_n)$ converges to a real number $L$ if, for all $\varepsilon > 0$, there exists a natural number $N$ such that for all $n \geq N$ we have

$$|a_n - L| < \varepsilon.$$

If $(a_n)$ is a sequence of complex numbers rather than a sequence of real numbers, this last formula can still be used to define convergence, with the provision that $|\cdot|$ denotes the modulus, i.e. $|z| = \sqrt{z^*z}$, where $z^*$ is the complex conjugate of $z$. If $(a_n)$ is a sequence of points in a metric space, then the formula can be used to define convergence, if the expression $|a_n-L|$ is replaced by the expression $\operatorname{dist}(a_n, L)$, which denotes the distance between $a_n$ and $L$.

=== Applications and important results ===
If $(a_n)$ and $(b_n)$ are convergent sequences, then the following limits exist, and can be computed as follows:

- $\lim_{n\to\infty} (a_n \pm b_n) = \lim_{n\to\infty} a_n \pm \lim_{n\to\infty} b_n$
- $\lim_{n\to\infty} c a_n = c \lim_{n\to\infty} a_n$ for all real numbers $c$
- $\lim_{n\to\infty} (a_n b_n) = \bigl( \lim_{n\to\infty} a_n \bigr) \bigl( \lim_{n\to\infty} b_n \bigr)$
- $\lim_{n\to\infty} \frac{a_n} {b_n} = \bigl( \lim \limits_{n\to\infty} a_n \bigr) \big/ \bigl( \lim \limits_{n\to\infty} b_n \bigr)$, provided that $\lim_{n\to\infty} b_n \ne 0$
- $\lim_{n\to\infty} a_n^p = \bigl( \lim_{n\to\infty} a_n \bigr)^p$ for all $p > 0$ and $a_n > 0$

Moreover:

- If $a_n \leq b_n$ for all $n$ greater than some $N$, then $\lim_{n\to\infty} a_n \leq \lim_{n\to\infty} b_n$. (Note: If the inequalities are replaced by strict inequalities then this is false: There are sequences such that $a_n < b_n$ for all $n$, but $\lim_{n\to\infty} a_n = \lim_{n\to\infty} b_n$.)
- (Squeeze theorem)
  If $(c_n)$ is a sequence such that $a_n \leq c_n \leq b_n$ for all $n > N$ and $\lim_{n\to\infty} a_n = \lim_{n\to\infty} b_n = L$,
  then $(c_n)$ is convergent, and $\lim_{n\to\infty} c_n = L$.
- If a sequence is bounded and monotonic then it is convergent.
- A sequence is convergent if and only if all of its subsequences are convergent.

=== Cauchy sequences ===
The plot of a Cauchy sequence (X_{n}), shown in blue, as X_{n} versus n. In the graph the sequence appears to be converging to a limit as the distance between consecutive terms in the sequence gets smaller as n increases. In the real numbers every Cauchy sequence converges to some limit.

A Cauchy sequence is a sequence whose terms become arbitrarily close together as n gets very large. The notion of a Cauchy sequence is important in the study of sequences in metric spaces, and, in particular, in real analysis. One particularly important result in real analysis is Cauchy characterization of convergence for sequences:

A sequence of real numbers is convergent (in the reals) if and only if it is Cauchy.

In contrast, there are Cauchy sequences of rational numbers that are not convergent in the rationals, e.g. the sequence defined by $x_1 = 1$ and $x_{n+1} = \tfrac12\bigl(x_n + \tfrac{2}{x_n}\bigr)$ is Cauchy, but has no rational limit (cf. Cauchy sequence § Non-example: rational numbers). More generally, any sequence of rational numbers that converges to an irrational number is Cauchy, but not convergent when interpreted as a sequence in the set of rational numbers.

Metric spaces that satisfy the Cauchy characterization of convergence for sequences are called complete metric spaces and are particularly nice for analysis.

=== Infinite limits ===
In calculus, it is common to define notation for sequences which do not converge in the sense discussed above, but which instead become and remain arbitrarily large, or become and remain arbitrarily negative. If $a_n$ becomes arbitrarily large as $n \to \infty$, we write

$$\lim_{n\to\infty}a_n = \infty.$$

In this case we say that the sequence diverges, or that it converges to infinity. An example of such a sequence is a_{n} = n.

If $a_n$ becomes arbitrarily negative (i.e. negative and large in magnitude) as $n \to \infty$, we write

$$\lim_{n\to\infty}a_n = -\infty$$

and say that the sequence diverges or converges to negative infinity.

== Series ==
A series is, informally speaking, the sum of the terms of a sequence. That is, it is an expression of the form $\sum_{n = 1}^\infty a_n$ or $a_1 + a_2 + \cdots$, where $(a_n)$ is a sequence of real or complex numbers. The partial sums of a series are the expressions resulting from replacing the infinity symbol with a finite number, i.e. the Nth partial sum of the series $\sum_{n = 1}^\infty a_n$ is the number

$$S_N = \sum_{n = 1}^N a_n = a_1 + a_2 + \cdots + a_N.$$

The partial sums themselves form a sequence $(S_N)_{N\in\N}$, which is called the sequence of partial sums of the series $\sum_{n = 1}^\infty a_n$. If the sequence of partial sums converges, then we say that the series $\sum_{n = 1}^\infty a_n$ is convergent, and the limit $\lim_{N\to\infty} S_N$ is called the value of the series. The same notation is used to denote a series and its value, i.e. we write $\sum_{n = 1}^\infty a_n = \lim_{N\to\infty} S_N$.

== Use in other fields of mathematics ==
=== Topology ===
Sequences play an important role in topology, especially in the study of metric spaces. For instance:

- A metric space is compact exactly when it is sequentially compact.
- A function from a metric space to another metric space is continuous exactly when it takes convergent sequences to convergent sequences.
- A metric space is a connected space if and only if, whenever the space is partitioned into two sets, one of the two sets contains a sequence converging to a point in the other set.
- A topological space is separable exactly when there is a dense sequence of points.

Sequences can be generalized to nets or filters. These generalizations allow one to extend some of the above theorems to spaces without metrics.

==== Product topology ====
The topological product of a sequence of topological spaces is the cartesian product of those spaces, equipped with a natural topology called the product topology.

More formally, given a sequence of spaces $(X_i)_{i\in\N}$, the product space

$$X := \prod_{i\in\N} X_i,$$

is defined as the set of all sequences $(x_i)_{i\in\N}$ such that for each i, $x_i$ is an element of $X_i$. The canonical projections are the maps p_{i} : X → X_{i} defined by the equation $p_i((x_j)_{j\in\N}) = x_i$. Then the product topology on X is defined to be the coarsest topology (i.e. the topology with the fewest open sets) for which all the projections p_{i} are continuous. The product topology is sometimes called the Tychonoff topology.

=== Analysis ===
When discussing sequences in analysis, one will generally consider sequences of the form

$$(x_1, x_2, x_3, \dots)\text{ or }(x_0, x_1, x_2, \dots)$$

which is to say, infinite sequences of elements indexed by natural numbers.

A sequence may start with an index different from 1 or 0. For example, the sequence defined by x_{n} = 1/log(n), where log is the natural logarithm, would be defined only for n ≥ 2. When talking about such infinite sequences, it is usually sufficient (and does not change much for most considerations) to assume that the members of the sequence are defined at least for all indices large enough, that is, greater than some given N.

The most elementary type of sequences are numerical ones, that is, sequences of real or complex numbers. This type can be generalized to sequences of elements of some vector space. In analysis, the vector spaces considered are often function spaces. Even more generally, one can study sequences with elements in some topological space.

==== Sequence spaces ====
A sequence space is a vector space whose elements are infinite sequences of real or complex numbers. Equivalently, it is a function space whose elements are functions from the natural numbers to the field K, where K is either the field of real numbers or the field of complex numbers. The set of all such functions is naturally identified with the set of all possible infinite sequences with elements in K, and can be turned into a vector space under the operations of pointwise addition of functions and pointwise scalar multiplication. All sequence spaces are linear subspaces of this space. Sequence spaces are typically equipped with a norm, or at least the structure of a topological vector space.

The most important sequences spaces in analysis are the ℓ^{p} spaces, consisting of the p-power summable sequences, with the p-norm. These are special cases of L^{p} spaces for the counting measure on the set of natural numbers. Other important classes of sequences like convergent sequences or null sequences form sequence spaces, respectively denoted c and c_{0}, with the sup norm. Any sequence space can also be equipped with the topology of pointwise convergence, under which it becomes a special kind of Fréchet space called an FK-space.

=== Linear algebra ===
Sequences over a field may also be viewed as vectors in a vector space. Specifically, the set of F-valued sequences (where F is a field) is a function space (in fact, a product space) of F-valued functions over the set of natural numbers.

=== Abstract algebra ===
Abstract algebra employs several types of sequences, including sequences of mathematical objects such as groups or rings.

==== Free monoid ====
If A is a set, the free monoid over A (denoted A^{*}, also called Kleene star of A) is a monoid containing all the finite sequences (or strings) of zero or more elements of A, with the binary operation of concatenation. The free semigroup A^{+} is the subsemigroup of A^{*} containing all elements except the empty sequence.

==== Exact sequences ====
In the context of group theory, a sequence

$$G_0 \;\overset{f_1}{\longrightarrow}\; G_1 \;\overset{f_2}{\longrightarrow}\; G_2 \;\overset{f_3}{\longrightarrow}\; \cdots \;\overset{f_n}{\longrightarrow}\; G_n$$

of groups and group homomorphisms is called exact, if the image (or range) of each homomorphism is equal to the kernel of the next:

$$\mathrm{im}(f_k) = \mathrm{ker}(f_{k+1})$$

The sequence of groups and homomorphisms may be either finite or infinite.

A similar definition can be made for certain other algebraic structures. For example, one could have an exact sequence of vector spaces and linear maps, or of modules and module homomorphisms.

==== Spectral sequences ====
In homological algebra and algebraic topology, a spectral sequence is a means of computing homology groups by taking successive approximations. Spectral sequences are a generalization of exact sequences, and since their introduction by Jean Leray (1946), they have become an important research tool, particularly in homotopy theory.

=== Set theory ===
An ordinal-indexed sequence is a generalization of a sequence. If α is a limit ordinal and X is a set, an α-indexed sequence of elements of X is a function from α to X. In this terminology an ω-indexed sequence is an ordinary sequence.

=== Computing ===
In computer science, finite sequences are called lists. Potentially infinite sequences are called streams. Finite sequences of characters or digits are called strings.

=== Streams ===
Infinite sequences of digits (or characters) drawn from a finite alphabet are of particular interest in theoretical computer science. They are often referred to simply as sequences or streams, as opposed to finite strings. Infinite binary sequences, for instance, are infinite sequences of bits (characters drawn from the alphabet {0, 1}). The set C = {0, 1}^{∞} of all infinite binary sequences is sometimes called the Cantor space.

An infinite binary sequence can represent a formal language (a set of strings) by setting the nth bit of the sequence to 1 if and only if the nth string (in shortlex order) is in the language. This representation is useful in the diagonalization method for proofs.

== See also ==
- Enumeration
- On-Line Encyclopedia of Integer Sequences
- Recurrence relation
- Sequence space

Operations

- Cauchy product

Examples

- Discrete-time signal
- Farey sequence
- Fibonacci sequence
- Look-and-say sequence
- Thue–Morse sequence
- List of integer sequences

Types

- ±1-sequence
- Arithmetic progression
- Automatic sequence
- Cauchy sequence
- Constant-recursive sequence
- Geometric progression
- Harmonic progression
- Holonomic sequence
- Regular sequence
- Pseudorandom binary sequence
- Random sequence

Related concepts

- List (computing)
- Net (topology) (a generalization of sequences)
- Ordinal-indexed sequence
- Recursion (computer science)
- Set (mathematics)
- Tuple
- Permutation
