= Superperfect =

Superperfect may refer to:

- Superperfect group
- Superperfect number
