= Cake number =

Concept in combinatorics

Three orthogonal planes slice a cake into at most eight (C_{3}) pieces

Animation showing the cutting planes required to cut a cake into 15 pieces with 4 slices (representing the 5th cake number). Fourteen of the pieces would have an external surface, with one tetrahedron cut out of the middle.

In mathematics, the cake number, denoted by C_{n}, is the maximum of the number of regions into which a 3-dimensional cube can be partitioned by exactly n planes. The cake number is so called because one may imagine each partition of the cube by a plane as a slice made by a knife through a cube-shaped cake. It is the 3D analogue of the lazy caterer's sequence.

The values of C_{n} for n = 0, 1, 2, ... are given by 1, 2, 4, 8, 15, 26, 42, 64, 93, 130, 176, 232, ... (sequence A000125 in the OEIS).

== General formula ==
If n! denotes the factorial, and we denote the binomial coefficients by

$${n \choose k} = \frac{n!}{k!(n-k)!},$$

and we assume that n planes are available to partition the cube, then the n-th cake number is:

$$C_n = {n \choose 3} + {n \choose 2} + {n \choose 1} + {n \choose 0} = \tfrac{1}{6}\!\left(n^3 + 5n + 6\right) = \tfrac{1}{6}(n+1)\left(n(n-1) + 6\right).$$

== Properties ==
The cake numbers are the 3-dimensional analogue of the 2-dimensional lazy caterer's sequence. The difference between successive cake numbers also gives the lazy caterer's sequence.

Cake numbers (blue) and other OEIS sequences in Bernoulli's triangle

The fourth column of Bernoulli's triangle (k = 3) gives the cake numbers for n cuts, where n ≥ 3.

Proof without words that summing up to the first 4 terms on each row of Pascal's triangle is equivalent to summing up to the first 2 even terms of the next row

The sequence can be alternatively derived from the sum of up to the first 4 terms of each row of Pascal's triangle:

k n	0	1	2	3	Sum
0	1	—	—	—	1
1	1	1	—	—	2
2	1	2	1	—	4
3	1	3	3	1	8
4	1	4	6	4	15
5	1	5	10	10	26
6	1	6	15	20	42
7	1	7	21	35	64
8	1	8	28	56	93
9	1	9	36	84	130

== Other applications ==
In n spatial (not spacetime) dimensions, Maxwell's equations represent $C_n$ different independent real-valued equations.

== See also ==
- Dividing a circle into areas (Moser's circle problem)
- Lazy caterer's sequence
- Pizza theorem
