= Frugal number =

Number that has more digits than the number of digits in its prime factorization

In number theory, a frugal number is a natural number in a given number base that has more digits than the number of digits in its prime factorization in the given number base (including exponents). For example, in base 10, 125 = 5^{3}, 128 = 2^{7}, 243 = 3^{5}, and 256 = 2^{8} are frugal numbers (sequence A046759 in the OEIS). The first frugal number which is not a prime power is 1029 = 3 × 7^{3}. In base 2, thirty-two is a frugal number, since 32 = 2^{5} is written in base 2 as 100000 = 10^{101}.

The term economical number has been used for a frugal number, but also for a number which is either frugal or equidigital.

== Mathematical definition ==
Let $b > 1$ be a number base, and let $K_b(n) = \lfloor \log_b{n} \rfloor + 1$ be the number of digits in a natural number $n$ for base $b$. A natural number $n$ has the prime factorisation

$$n = \prod_{\stackrel{p \,\mid\, n}{p\text{ prime}}} p^{v_p(n)}$$

where $v_p(n)$ is the p-adic valuation of $n$, and $n$ is an frugal number in base $b$ if

$$K_b(n) > \sum_{{\stackrel{p \,\mid\, n}{p\text{ prime}}}} K_b(p) + \sum_{{\stackrel{p^2 \,\mid\, n}{p\text{ prime}}}} K_b(v_p(n)).$$

== See also ==
- Equidigital number
- Extravagant number
