= Aronson's sequence =

Sequence of numbers

Aronson's sequence is an integer sequence defined by the English sentence "T is the first, fourth, eleventh, sixteenth, ... letter in this sentence." Spaces and punctuation are ignored. The first few numbers in the sequence are:

1, 4, 11, 16, 24, 29, 33, 35, 39, 45, 47, 51, 56, 58, 62, 64, 69, 73, 78, 80, 84, 89, 94, 99, 104, 111, 116, 122, 126, 131, 136, 142, 147, 158, 164, 169, ... (sequence A005224 in the OEIS).

In Douglas Hofstadter's book Metamagical Themas, the sequence is credited to Jeffrey Aronson of Oxford, England. The sequence is infinite—and this statement requires some proof. The proof depends on the observation that the English names of all ordinal numbers, except those that end in 2, must contain at least one "t".

Aronson's sequence is closely related to autograms. There are many generalizations of Aronson's sequence and research into the topic is ongoing.

Cloitre, Sloane & Vandermast (2003) write that Aronson's sequence is "a classic example of a self-referential sequence." However, they criticize it for being ambiguously defined due to the variation in naming of numbers over one hundred in different dialects of English. In its place, they offer several other self-referential sequences whose definitions rely only on mathematics rather than on the English language.
