= Extravagant number =

Number that has fewer digits than the number of digits in its prime factorization

In number theory, an extravagant number (also known as a wasteful number) is a natural number in a given number base that has fewer digits than the number of digits in its prime factorization in the given number base (including exponents). For example, in base 10, 4 = 2^{2}, 6 = 2×3, 8 = 2^{3}, and 9 = 3^{2} are extravagant numbers (sequence A046760 in the OEIS).

There are infinitely many extravagant numbers in every base.

== Mathematical definition ==
Let $b > 1$ be a number base, and let $K_b(n) = \lfloor \log_{b}{n} \rfloor + 1$ be the number of digits in a natural number $n$ for base $b$. A natural number $n$ has the prime factorisation

$$n = \prod_{\stackrel{p \,\mid\, n}{p\text{ prime}}} p^{v_p(n)}$$

where $v_p(n)$ is the p-adic valuation of $n$, and $n$ is an extravagant number in base $b$ if

$$K_b(n) < \sum_{{\stackrel{p \,\mid\, n}{p\text{ prime}}}} K_b(p) + \sum_{{\stackrel{p^2 \,\mid\, n}{p\text{ prime}}}} K_b(v_p(n)).$$

== See also ==
- Equidigital number
- Frugal number
