= Golomb sequence =

Sequence of integers

In mathematics, the Golomb sequence, named after Solomon W. Golomb (but also called Silverman's sequence), is a monotonically increasing integer sequence where a_{n} is the number of times that n occurs in the sequence, starting with a_{1} = 1, and with the property that for n > 1 each a_{n} is the smallest positive integer which makes it possible to satisfy the condition. For example, a_{1} = 1 says that 1 only occurs once in the sequence, so a_{2} cannot be 1 too, but it can be 2, and therefore must be 2. The first few values are

1, 2, 2, 3, 3, 4, 4, 4, 5, 5, 5, 6, 6, 6, 6, 7, 7, 7, 7, 8, 8, 8, 8, 9, 9, 9, 9, 9, 10, 10, 10, 10, 10, 11, 11, 11, 11, 11, 12, 12, 12, 12, 12, 12 (sequence A001462 in the OEIS).

== Examples ==
a_{1} = 1
Therefore, 1 occurs exactly one time in this sequence.

a_{2} > 1
a_{2} = 2

2 occurs exactly 2 times in this sequence.
a_{3} = 2

3 occurs exactly 2 times in this sequence.

a_{4} = a_{5} = 3

4 occurs exactly 3 times in this sequence.
5 occurs exactly 3 times in this sequence.

a_{6} = a_{7} = a_{8} = 4
a_{9} = a_{10} = a_{11} = 5

etc.

== Recurrence ==
Colin Mallows has given an explicit recurrence relation $a(1) = 1; a(n+1) = 1 + a(n + 1 - a(a(n)))$. An asymptotic expression for a_{n} is

$$\varphi^{2-\varphi}n^{\varphi-1}$$

where $\varphi$ is the golden ratio (approximately equal to 1.618034).
