= Lazy caterer's sequence =

Counts pieces of a disk cut by lines

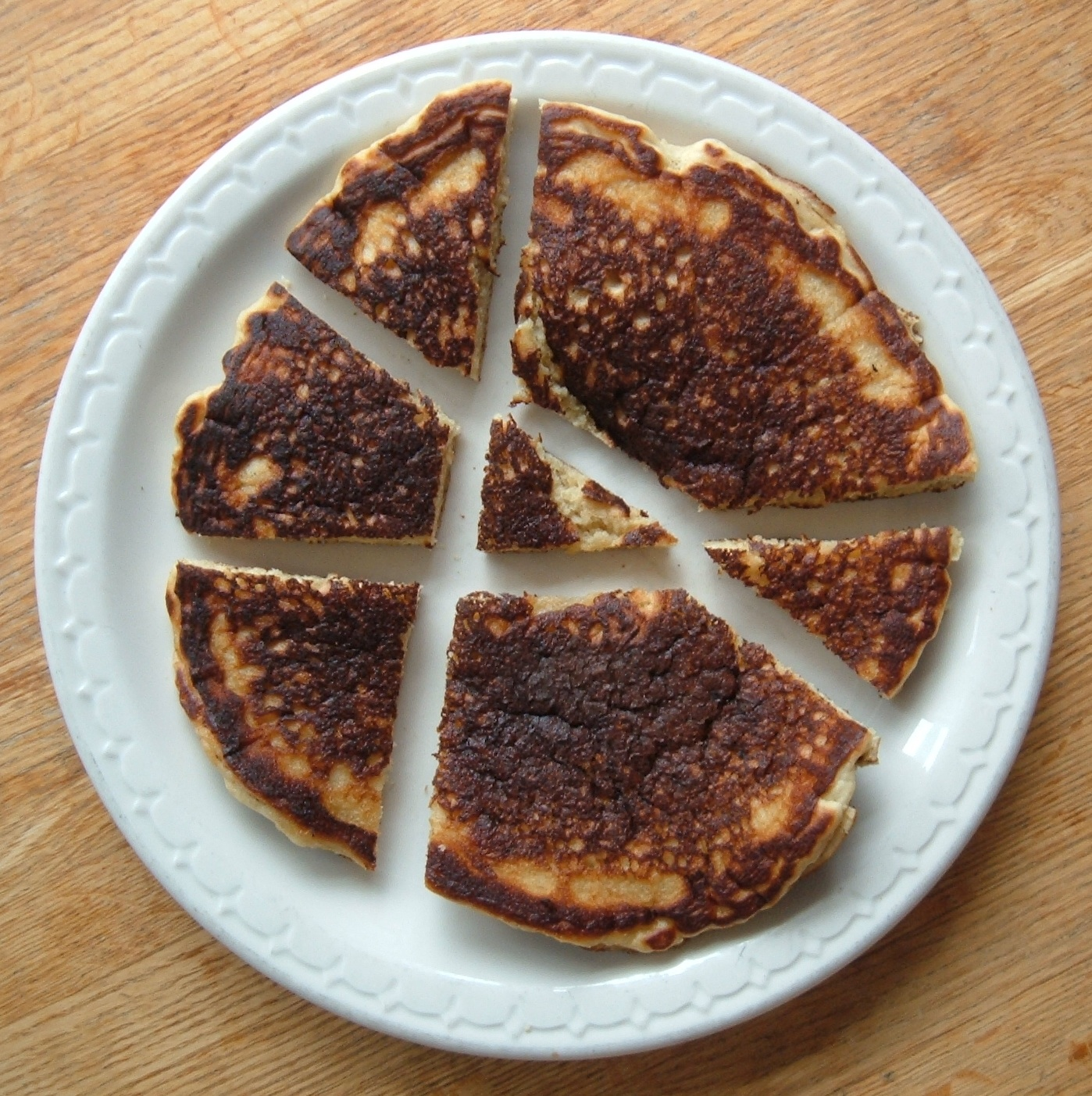
Pancake cut into seven pieces with three straight cuts.

The lazy caterer's sequence, more formally known as the central polygonal numbers, describes the maximum number of pieces of a disk (a pancake or pizza is usually used to describe the situation) that can be made with a given number of straight cuts. For example, three cuts across a pancake will produce six pieces if the cuts all meet at a common point inside the circle, but up to seven if they do not. This problem can be formalized mathematically as one of counting the cells in an arrangement of lines; for generalizations to higher dimensions, see arrangement of hyperplanes.

The analogue of this sequence in three dimensions is the cake numbers.

== Formula and sequence ==
The maximum number of pieces, p obtainable with n straight cuts is the n-th triangular number plus one, forming the lazy caterer's sequence (OEIS A000124)

The maximum number p of pieces that can be created with a given number of cuts n (where n ≥ 0) is given by the formula

$$p = \frac{n^2+n+2}{2}.$$

Using binomial coefficients, the formula can be expressed as

$$p = 1 + \dbinom{n + 1}{2} = \dbinom{n}{0}+\dbinom{n}{1}+\dbinom{n}{2}.$$

Simply put, each number equals a triangular number plus 1. These are the first number on each row of Floyd's triangle.

The lazy caterer's sequence (green) and other OEIS sequences in Bernoulli's triangle

As the third column of Bernoulli's triangle (k = 2) is a triangular number plus one, it forms the lazy caterer's sequence for n cuts, where n ≥ 2.

Proof without words that summing up to the first 3 terms on each row of Pascal's triangle is equivalent to summing up to the first 2 odd terms of the next row

The sequence can be alternatively derived from the sum of up to the first 3 terms of each row of Pascal's triangle:

k n	0	1	2	Sum
0	1	-	-	1
1	1	1	-	2
2	1	2	1	4
3	1	3	3	7
4	1	4	6	11
5	1	5	10	16
6	1	6	15	22
7	1	7	21	29
8	1	8	28	37
9	1	9	36	46

This sequence (sequence A000124 in the OEIS), starting with n = 0, thus results in

1, 2, 4, 7, 11, 16, 22, 29, 37, 46, 56, 67, 79, 92, 106, 121, 137, 154, 172, 191, 211, 232, 254, 277, 301, 326, 352, 379, 407, 436, 466, 497, 529, ...

Its three-dimensional analogue is known as the cake numbers. The difference between successive cake numbers gives the lazy caterer's sequence.

== Proof ==
The maximum number of pieces from consecutive cuts are the numbers in the Lazy Caterer's Sequence.

When a circle is cut n times to produce the maximum number of pieces, represented as p = f (n), the nth cut must be considered; the number of pieces before the last cut is f (n − 1), while the number of pieces added by the last cut is n.

To obtain the maximum number of pieces, the nth cut line should cross all the other previous cut lines inside the circle, but not cross any intersection of previous cut lines. Thus, the nth line itself is cut in n − 1 places, and into n line segments. Each segment divides one piece of the (n − 1)-cut pancake into 2 parts, adding exactly n to the number of pieces. The new line cannot have any more segments since it can only cross each previous line once. A cut line can always cross over all previous cut lines, as rotating the knife at a small angle around a point that is not an existing intersection will, if the angle is small enough, intersect all the previous lines including the last one added.

Thus, the total number of pieces after n cuts is

$$f(n) = n+f(n-1).$$

This recurrence relation can be solved. If f (n − 1) is expanded one term, the relation becomes

$$f(n) = n+(n-1)+f(n-2).$$

Expansion of the term f (n − 2) can continue until the last term is reduced to f (0), thus,

$$f(n) = n+(n-1)+(n-2)+\cdots+1+f(0).$$

Since f (0) = 1, because there is one piece before any cuts are made, this can be rewritten as

$$f(n) = 1+(1+2+3+\cdots + n).$$

This can be simplified, using the formula for the sum of an arithmetic progression:

$$f(n)=1+\frac{n(n+1)}{2}=\frac{n^2+n+2}{2}.$$

== See also ==
- Cake number
- Dividing a circle into areas – where n is the number of sides of an inscribed polygon
- Floyd's triangle
- Pizza theorem
