= Equidigital number =

Same digit count as prime factorization

Demonstration, with Cuisenaire rods, that the composite number 10 is equidigital: 10 has two digits, and 2 × 5 has two digits (1 is excluded)

In number theory, an equidigital number is a natural number in a given number base that has the same number of digits as the number of digits in its prime factorization in the given number base, including exponents but excluding exponents equal to 1. For example, in base 10, 1, 2, 3, 5, 7, and 10 (2 × 5) are equidigital numbers (sequence A046758 in the OEIS). All prime numbers are equidigital numbers in any base.

A number that is either equidigital or frugal is said to be economical.

== Mathematical definition ==
Let $b > 1$ be the number base, and let $K_b(n) = \lfloor \log_{b}{n} \rfloor + 1$ be the number of digits in a natural number $n$ for base $b$. A natural number $n$ has the prime factorisation

$$n = \prod_{\stackrel{p \,\mid\, n}{p\text{ prime}}} p^{v_p(n)}$$

where $v_p(n)$ is the p-adic valuation of $n$, and $n$ is an equidigital number in base $b$ if

$$K_b(n) = \sum_{{\stackrel{p \,\mid\, n}{p\text{ prime}}}} K_b(p) + \sum_{{\stackrel{p^2 \,\mid\, n}{p\text{ prime}}}} K_b(v_p(n)).$$

== Properties ==
- Every prime number is equidigital. This also proves that there are infinitely many equidigital numbers.

== See also ==
- Extravagant number
- Frugal number
- Smith number
