= Juggler sequence =

Integer sequence in number theory

Directed Graph of the first 25 integers and their juggler sequences. The longest path has been highlighted (25) to show the juggling behavior.

In number theory, a juggler sequence is an integer sequence that starts with a positive integer a_{0}, with each subsequent term in the sequence defined by the recurrence relation:
$$a_{k+1}= \begin{cases}
\left \lfloor {a_k}^{1/2} \right \rfloor,  & \text{if } a_k \text{ is even} \\
\\
\left \lfloor {a_k}^{3/2} \right \rfloor,  & \text{if } a_k \text{ is odd}.
\end{cases}$$

== Background ==
Juggler sequences were publicized by American mathematician and author Clifford A. Pickover. The name is derived from the rising and falling nature of the sequences, like balls in the hands of a juggler.

For example, the juggler sequence starting with a_{0} = 3 is

$$a_1= \lfloor 3^\frac{3}{2} \rfloor = \lfloor 5.196\dots \rfloor = 5,$$
$$a_2= \lfloor 5^\frac{3}{2} \rfloor = \lfloor 11.180\dots \rfloor = 11,$$
$$a_3= \lfloor 11^\frac{3}{2} \rfloor = \lfloor 36.482\dots \rfloor = 36,$$
$$a_4= \lfloor 36^\frac{1}{2} \rfloor = \lfloor 6 \rfloor = 6,$$
$$a_5= \lfloor 6^\frac{1}{2} \rfloor = \lfloor 2.449\dots \rfloor = 2,$$
$$a_6= \lfloor 2^\frac{1}{2} \rfloor = \lfloor 1.414\dots \rfloor = 1.$$

If a juggler sequence reaches 1, then all subsequent terms are equal to 1. It is conjectured that all juggler sequences eventually reach 1. This conjecture has been verified for all initial terms up to 7110200, so that 7110201 is the first number that lacks verification, but has not been proven or disproven.

For a given initial term n, one defines l(n) to be the number of steps which the juggler sequence starting at n takes to first reach 1, and h(n) to be the maximum value in the juggler sequence starting at n. For small values of n we have:

n	Juggler sequence	l(n) (sequence A007320 in the OEIS)	h(n) (sequence A094716 in the OEIS)
2	2, 1	1	2
3	3, 5, 11, 36, 6, 2, 1	6	36
4	4, 2, 1	2	4
5	5, 11, 36, 6, 2, 1	5	36
6	6, 2, 1	2	6
7	7, 18, 4, 2, 1	4	18
8	8, 2, 1	2	8
9	9, 27, 140, 11, 36, 6, 2, 1	7	140
10	10, 3, 5, 11, 36, 6, 2, 1	7	36

Juggler sequences can reach very large values before descending to 1. For example, the juggler sequence starting at a_{0} = 37 reaches a maximum value of 24906114455136. Harry J. Smith has determined that the juggler sequence starting at a_{0} = 48443 reaches a maximum value at a_{60} with 972,463 digits, before reaching 1 at a_{157}.

== See also ==
- Arithmetic dynamics
- Collatz conjecture
- Recurrence relation
