= Recamán's sequence =

Endless sequence of integers

In mathematics and computer science, Recamán's sequence is a sequence defined by a recurrence relation. Because its elements are related to the previous elements in a straightforward way, they are often defined using recursion.

A drawing of the first 75 terms of Recamán's sequence, according to the method of visualization shown in the Numberphile video "The Slightly Spooky Recamán Sequence"

Recamán's sequence was named after its inventor, Colombian mathematician Bernardo Recamán Santos, by Neil Sloane, creator of the On-Line Encyclopedia of Integer Sequences (OEIS).

== Definition ==
Recamán's sequence $a_0, a_1, a_2\dots$ is defined as:

$$a_n = \begin{cases}
0 && \text{if } n = 0 \\
a_{n - 1} -n && \text{if } a_{n - 1} -n > 0 \text{ and is not already in the sequence} \\
a_{n - 1} + n && \text{otherwise}
\end{cases}$$

The first terms of the sequence are:

0, 1, 3, 6, 2, 7, 13, 20, 12, 21, 11, 22, 10, 23, 9, 24, 8, 25, 43, 62, 42, 63, 41, 18, 42, 17, 43, 16, 44, 15, 45, 14, 46, 79, 113, 78, 114, 77, 39, 78, 38, 79, 37, 80, 36, 81, 35, 82, 34, 83, 33, 84, 32, 85, 31, 86, 30, 87, 29, 88, 28, 89, 27, 90, 26, 91, 157, 224, 156, 225, 155, ... (sequence A005132 in the OEIS)

== Visual representation ==
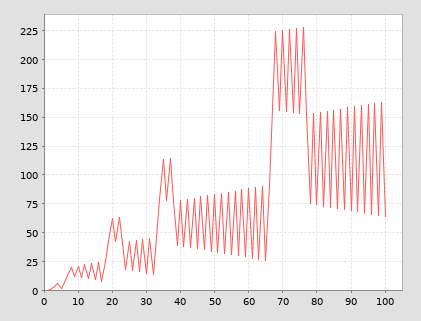
A plot for the first 100 terms of the Recamán's sequence

The most-common visualization of the Recamán's sequence is simply plotting its values, such as the figure seen here.

On January 14, 2018, the Numberphile YouTube channel published a video titled "The Slightly Spooky Recamán Sequence", showing a visualization using alternating semi-circles, as it is shown in the figure at the top of this page.

== Sound representation ==
"Recamán's sequence"
"Play Recamán's sequence."

Values of the sequence can be associated with musical notes, in such that the running of the sequence can be associated with an execution of a musical tune.

== Properties ==
The sequence satisfies:

$$a_n \geq 0$$
$$|a_n - a_{n-1}| = n$$

While the sequence attempts to avoid repeated terms while subtracting, it does not do so while adding, and repeats do in fact occur. Since there are repeated terms, this is not a permutation of the integers.

The first repeated term is $42 = a_{24} = a_{20}$. Another one is $43 = a_{18} = a_{26}$.

=== Conjecture ===
Neil Sloane has conjectured that every number eventually appears, but this has not been proven. As of 2026, 10^{612} terms have been calculated, and 852,655 is the smallest natural number to not appear on the list.
