= Hyperperfect number =

Type of natural number

In number theory, a k-hyperperfect number is a natural number n for which the equality $n = 1+k(\sigma(n)-n-1)$ holds, where σ(n) is the divisor function (i.e., the sum of all positive divisors of n). A hyperperfect number is a k-hyperperfect number for some integer k. Hyperperfect numbers generalize perfect numbers, which are 1-hyperperfect.

The first few numbers in the sequence of k-hyperperfect numbers are 6, 21, 28, 301, 325, 496, 697, ... (sequence A034897 in the OEIS), with the corresponding values of k being 1, 2, 1, 6, 3, 1, 12, ... (sequence A034898 in the OEIS). The first few k-hyperperfect numbers that are not perfect are 21, 301, 325, 697, 1333, ... (sequence A007592 in the OEIS).

== List of hyperperfect numbers ==
The following table lists the first few k-hyperperfect numbers for some values of k, together with the sequence number in the On-Line Encyclopedia of Integer Sequences (OEIS) of the sequence of k-hyperperfect numbers:

List of some known k-hyperperfect numbers
k	k-hyperperfect numbers	OEIS
1	6, 28, 496, 8128, 33550336, ...	OEIS: A000396
2	21, 2133, 19521, 176661, 129127041, ...	OEIS: A007593
3	325, ...	
4	1950625, 1220640625, ...	
6	301, 16513, 60110701, 1977225901, ...	OEIS: A028499
10	159841, ...	
11	10693, ...	
12	697, 2041, 1570153, 62722153, 10604156641, 13544168521, ...	OEIS: A028500
18	1333, 1909, 2469601, 893748277, ...	OEIS: A028501
19	51301, ...	
30	3901, 28600321, ...	
31	214273, ...	
35	306181, ...	
40	115788961, ...	
48	26977, 9560844577, ...	
59	1433701, ...	
60	24601, ...	
66	296341, ...	
75	2924101, ...	
78	486877, ...	
91	5199013, ...	
100	10509080401, ...	
108	275833, ...	
126	12161963773, ...	
132	96361, 130153, 495529, ...	
136	156276648817, ...	
138	46727970517, 51886178401, ...	
140	1118457481, ...	
168	250321, ...	
174	7744461466717, ...	
180	12211188308281, ...	
190	1167773821, ...	
192	163201, 137008036993, ...	
198	1564317613, ...	
206	626946794653, 54114833564509, ...	
222	348231627849277, ...	
228	391854937, 102744892633, 3710434289467, ...	
252	389593, 1218260233, ...	
276	72315968283289, ...	
282	8898807853477, ...	
296	444574821937, ...	
342	542413, 26199602893, ...	
348	66239465233897, ...	
350	140460782701, ...	
360	23911458481, ...	
366	808861, ...	
372	2469439417, ...	
396	8432772615433, ...	
402	8942902453, 813535908179653, ...	
408	1238906223697, ...	
414	8062678298557, ...	
430	124528653669661, ...	
438	6287557453, ...	
480	1324790832961, ...	
522	723378252872773, 106049331638192773, ...	
546	211125067071829, ...	
570	1345711391461, 5810517340434661, ...	
660	13786783637881, ...	
672	142718568339485377, ...	
684	154643791177, ...	
774	8695993590900027, ...	
810	5646270598021, ...	
814	31571188513, ...	
816	31571188513, ...	
820	1119337766869561, ...	
968	52335185632753, ...	
972	289085338292617, ...	
978	60246544949557, ...	
1050	64169172901, ...	
1410	80293806421, ...	
2772	95295817, 124035913, ...	OEIS: A028502
3918	61442077, 217033693, 12059549149, 60174845917, ...	
9222	404458477, 3426618541, 8983131757, 13027827181, ...	
9828	432373033, 2797540201, 3777981481, 13197765673, ...	
14280	848374801, 2324355601, 4390957201, 16498569361, ...	
23730	2288948341, 3102982261, 6861054901, 30897836341, ...	
31752	4660241041, 7220722321, 12994506001, 52929885457, 60771359377, ...	OEIS: A034916
55848	15166641361, 44783952721, 67623550801, ...	
67782	18407557741, 18444431149, 34939858669, ...	
92568	50611924273, 64781493169, 84213367729, ...	
100932	50969246953, 53192980777, 82145123113, ...	

It can be shown that if k > 1 is an odd integer and $p = \tfrac{3k+1}{2}$ and $q = 3k+4$ are prime numbers, then $p^2q$ is k-hyperperfect; Judson S. McCranie has conjectured in 2000 that all k-hyperperfect numbers for odd k > 1 are of this form, but the hypothesis has not been proven so far. Furthermore, it can be proven that if p ≠ q are odd primes and k is an integer such that $k(p+q) = pq-1,$ then pq is k-hyperperfect.

It is also possible to show that if k > 0 and $p = k+1$ is prime, then for all i > 1 such that $q = p^i - p+1$ is prime, $n = p^{i-1}q$ is k-hyperperfect. The following table lists known values of k and corresponding values of i for which n is k-hyperperfect:

Values of i for which n is k-hyperperfect
k	Values of i	OEIS
2	2, 4, 5, 6, 9, 22, 37, 41, 90, 102, 105, 317, 520, 541, 561, 648, 780, 786, 957, 1353, 2224, 2521, 6184, 7989, 8890, 19217, 20746, 31722, 37056, 69581, 195430, 225922, 506233, 761457, 1180181, ...	OEIS: A014224
4	5, 7, 15, 47, 81, 115, 267, 285, 7641, 19089, 25831, 32115, 59811, 70155, 178715, ...	OEIS: A059613
6	2, 3, 6, 9, 21, 25, 33, 49, 54, 133, 245, 255, 318, 1023, 1486, 3334, 6821, 8555, 11605, 42502, 44409, 90291, 92511, 140303, ...	OEIS: A191469
10	3, 17, 23, 79, 273, 2185, 4087, 5855, 17151, ..., 79133, ...	
12	2, 4, 5, 6, 13, 24, 64, 133, 268, 744, 952, 1261, 5794, 11833, ...	
16	11, 21, 127, 149, 469, 2019, 13953, 21689, 25679, ..., 81417, ...	OEIS: A034922
18	3, 4, 5, 7, 10, 12, 22, 52, 65, 125, 197, 267, 335, 348, 412, 1666, 1705, 3318, 11271, ..., 37074, ..., 61980, ..., 69025, ...	
22	17, 61, 445, 4381, 15041, 17569, ...	
28	33, 89, 101, 2439, 4605, 5905, 21193, 24183, ...	
30	3, 5, 29, 103, 106, 174, 615, 954, 1378, 5622, 6258, 8493, 13639, 14891, ..., 26243, ..., 31835, ..., 59713, ..., 78759, ...	
36	67, 95, 341, 577, 2651, 11761, ...	
40	3, 5, 55, 161, 197, 1697, 11991, 32295, 57783, ...	
42	4, 6, 42, 64, 65, 1017, 3390, 3894, 8904, 12976, 63177, ...	OEIS: A034923
46	5, 11, 13, 53, 115, 899, 2287, 47667, ...	OEIS: A034924
52	21, 173, 2153, 11793, ...	
58	11, 117, 21351, ...	
60	5, 13, 24, 42, 81, 112, 2592, 7609, 13054, 23088, 46427, ...	
66	2, 65, 345, 373, 2073, 4158, 4839, 39701, ...	
70	3019, 19719, ...	
72	21, 49, 1744, 2901, 6918, 7320, ...	
78	2, 4, 16, 29, 47, 142, 352, 4051, 9587, ...	
82	965, 2421, 12377, ...	
88	9, 41, 51, 109, 483, 42211, ...	OEIS: A034925
96	6, 11, 34, 12239, 12503, 19937, ...	
100	3, 7, 9, 19, 29, 99, 145, 623, 3001, 6225, ..., 23163, ...	OEIS: A034926
102	5, 17, 18, 40, 42, 45, 3616, 10441, 13192, 36005, 47825, ...	
106	7, 745, 3031, ..., 53125, ...	
108	4, 12, 19, 33, 88, 112, 225, 528, 870, 1936, 54683, ...	
