= Superperfect number =

Number whose divisors summed twice over equal twice itself

In number theory, a superperfect number is a positive integer n that satisfies

$$\sigma^2(n)=\sigma(\sigma(n))=2n\, ,$$

where σ is the sum-of-divisors function. Superperfect numbers are not a generalization of perfect numbers but have a common generalization. The term was coined by D. Suryanarayana (1969).

The first few superperfect numbers are:

2, 4, 16, 64, 4096, 65536, 262144, 1073741824, ... (sequence A019279 in the OEIS).

To illustrate: it can be seen that 16 is a superperfect number as σ(16) = 1 + 2 + 4 + 8 + 16 = 31, and σ(31) = 1 + 31 = 32, thus σ(σ(16)) = 32 = 2 × 16.

If n is an even superperfect number, then n must be a power of 2, 2^{k}, such that 2^{k+1} − 1 is a Mersenne prime.

It is not known whether there are any odd superperfect numbers. An odd superperfect number n would have to be a square number such that either n or σ(n) is divisible by at least three distinct primes. There are no odd superperfect numbers below 7×10^{24}.

== Generalizations ==
Perfect and superperfect numbers are examples of the wider class of m-superperfect numbers, which satisfy

$$\sigma^m(n) = 2n ,$$

corresponding to m = 1 and 2 respectively. For m ≥ 3 there are no even m-superperfect numbers.

The m-superperfect numbers are in turn examples of (m,k)-perfect numbers which satisfy

$$\sigma^m(n)=kn\, .$$

With this notation, perfect numbers are (1,2)-perfect, multiperfect numbers are (1,k)-perfect, superperfect numbers are (2,2)-perfect and m-superperfect numbers are (m,2)-perfect. Examples of classes of (m,k)-perfect numbers are:

m	k	(m,k)-perfect numbers	OEIS sequence
2	2	2, 4, 16, 64, 4096, 65536, 262144, 1073741824, 1152921504606846976	A019279
2	3	8, 21, 512	A019281
2	4	15, 1023, 29127, 355744082763	A019282
2	6	42, 84, 160, 336, 1344, 86016, 550095, 1376256, 5505024, 22548578304	A019283
2	7	24, 1536, 47360, 343976, 572941926400	A019284
2	8	60, 240, 960, 4092, 16368, 58254, 61440, 65472, 116508, 466032, 710400, 983040, 1864128, 3932160, 4190208, 67043328, 119304192, 268173312, 1908867072, 7635468288, 16106127360, 711488165526, 1098437885952, 1422976331052	A019285
2	9	168, 10752, 331520, 691200, 1556480, 1612800, 106151936, 5099962368, 4010593484800	A019286
2	10	480, 504, 13824, 32256, 32736, 1980342, 1396617984, 3258775296, 14763499520, 38385098752	A019287
2	11	4404480, 57669920, 238608384	A019288
2	12	2200380, 8801520, 14913024, 35206080, 140896000, 459818240, 775898880, 2253189120, 16785793024, 22648550400, 36051025920, 51001180160, 144204103680	A019289
2	13	57120, 932064, 3932040, 251650560	A019290
2	14	217728, 1278720, 2983680, 5621760, 14008320, 298721280, 955367424, 1874780160, 4874428416, 1957928934528	A019291
3	any	12, 14, 24, 52, 98, 156, 294, 684, 910, 1368, 1440, 4480, 4788, 5460, 5840, ...	A019292
4	any	2, 3, 4, 6, 8, 10, 12, 15, 18, 21, 24, 26, 32, 39, 42, 60, 65, 72, 84, 96, 160, 182, ...	A019293
