= Baum–Sweet sequence =

Mathematical sequence of 1s and 0s

In mathematics the Baum–Sweet sequence is an infinite automatic sequence of 0s and 1s defined by the rule:

b_{n} = 1 if the binary representation of n contains no block of consecutive 0s of odd length;
b_{n} = 0 otherwise;

for n ≥ 0.

For example, b_{4} = 1 because the binary representation of 4 is 100, which only contains one block of consecutive 0s of length 2; whereas b_{5} = 0 because the binary representation of 5 is 101, which contains a block of consecutive 0s of length 1.

Starting at n = 0, the first few terms of the Baum–Sweet sequence are:

1, 1, 0, 1, 1, 0, 0, 1, 0, 1, 0, 0, 1, 0, 0, 1 ... (sequence A086747 in the OEIS)

== Historical motivation ==
The properties of the sequence were first studied by Leonard E. Baum and Melvin M. Sweet in 1976. In 1949, Khinchin conjectured that there does not exist a non-quadratic algebraic real number having bounded partial quotients in its continued fraction expansion. A counterexample to this conjecture is still not known. Baum and Sweet's paper showed that the same expectation is not met for algebraic power series. They gave an example of cubic power series in $\mathbb{F}_2((X^{-1}))$ whose partial quotients are bounded. (The degree of the power series in Baum and Sweet's result is analogous to the degree of the field extension associated with the algebraic real in Khinchin's conjecture.)

One of the series considered in Baum and Sweet's paper is a root of

$f^3 + x^{-1}f + 1 = 0.$

The authors show that by Hensel's lemma, there is a unique such root in $\mathbb{F}_2((X^{-1}))$ because reducing the defining equation of $f$ modulo $X^{-1}$ gives $f^3+1$, which factors as

$$f^3+1 = (f+1)(f^2+f+1).$$

They go on to prove that this unique root has partial quotients of degree $\le 2$. Before doing so, they state (in the remark following Theorem 2, p 598) that the root can be written in the form

$$f = \sum_{k \ge 0} f_i X^{-k}$$

where $f_0 = 1$ and $f_k = 1$ for $k \ge 1$ if and only if the binary expansion of $n$ contains only even length blocks of $0$'s. This is the origin of the Baum–Sweet sequence.

Mkaouar and Yao proved that the partial quotients of the continued fraction for $f$ above do not form an automatic sequence. However, the sequence of partial quotients can be generated by a non-uniform morphism.

== Properties ==
The Baum–Sweet sequence can be generated by a 3-state automaton.

The value of term b_{n} in the Baum–Sweet sequence can be found recursively as follows. If n = m·4^{k}, where m is not divisible by 4 (or is 0), then

$$b_n =
\begin{cases}
1 & \text{if } n = 0 \\
0 & \text{if } m \text{ is even} \\
b_{(m-1)/2} & \text{if } m \text{ is odd}.
\end{cases}$$

Thus b_{76} = b_{9} = b_{4} = b_{0} = 1, which can be verified by observing that the binary representation of 76, which is 1001100, contains no consecutive blocks of 0s with odd length.

The Baum–Sweet word 1101100101001001..., which is created by concatenating the terms of the Baum–Sweet sequence, is a fixed point of the morphism or string substitution rules

00 → 0000
01 → 1001
10 → 0100
11 → 1101

as follows:

11 → 1101 → 11011001 → 1101100101001001 → 11011001010010011001000001001001 ...

From the morphism rules it can be seen that the Baum–Sweet word contains blocks of consecutive 0s of any length (b_{n} = 0 for all 2^{k} integers in the range 5.2^{k} ≤ n < 6.2^{k}), but it contains no block of three consecutive 1s.

More succinctly, by Cobham's little theorem the Baum–Sweet word can be expressed as a coding $\tau$ applied to the fixed point of a uniform morphism $\varphi$. Indeed, the morphism

$$\varphi(A) = AB, \varphi(B) = CB, \varphi(C) = BD, \varphi(D) = DD$$

and coding

$$\tau(A) = 1, \tau(B) = 1, \tau(C) = 0, \tau(D) = 0$$

generate the word in that way.
