= Narcissistic number =

Concept in number theory

In number theory, a narcissistic number (also known as a pluperfect digital invariant (PPDI), an Armstrong number (after Michael F. Armstrong) or a plus perfect number) in a given number base $b$ is a number that is the sum of its own digits each raised to the power of the number of digits.

== Definition ==
Let $n$ be a natural number. We define the narcissistic function for base $b > 1$ $F_{b} : \mathbb{N} \rightarrow \mathbb{N}$ to be the following:

$$F_{b}(n) = \sum_{i=0}^{k - 1} d_i^k.$$

where $k = \lfloor \log_{b}{n} \rfloor + 1$ is the number of digits in the number in base $b$, and

$$d_i = \frac{n \bmod{b^{i+1}} - n \bmod b^i}{b^i}$$

is the value of each digit of the number. A natural number $n$ is a narcissistic number if it is a fixed point for $F_{b}$, which occurs if $F_{b}(n) = n$. The natural numbers $0 \leq n < b$ are trivial narcissistic numbers for all $b$, all other narcissistic numbers are nontrivial narcissistic numbers.

For example, the number 153 in base $b = 10$ is a narcissistic number, because $k = 3$ and $153 = 1^3 + 5^3 + 3^3$.

A natural number $n$ is a sociable narcissistic number if it is a periodic point for $F_{b}$, where $F_{b}^p(n) = n$ for a positive integer $p$ (here $F_{b}^p$ is the $p$th iterate of $F_b$), and forms a cycle of period $p$. A narcissistic number is a sociable narcissistic number with $p = 1$, and an amicable narcissistic number is a sociable narcissistic number with $p = 2$.

All natural numbers $n$ are preperiodic points for $F_{b}$, regardless of the base. This is because for any given digit count $k$, the minimum possible value of $n$ is $b^{k - 1}$, the maximum possible value of $n$ is $b^{k} - 1 \leq b^k$, and the narcissistic function value is $F_{b}(n) = k(b-1)^k$. Thus, any narcissistic number must satisfy the inequality $b^{k - 1} \leq k(b-1)^k \leq b^k$. Multiplying all sides by $\frac{b}{(b - 1)^k}$, we get ${\left(\frac{b}{b - 1}\right)}^{k} \leq bk \leq b{\left(\frac{b}{b - 1}\right)}^{k}$, or equivalently, $k \leq {\left(\frac{b}{b - 1}\right)}^{k} \leq bk$. Since $\frac{b}{b - 1} \geq 1$, this means that there will be a maximum value $k$ where ${\left(\frac{b}{b - 1}\right)}^{k} \leq bk$, because of the exponential nature of ${\left(\frac{b}{b - 1}\right)}^{k}$ and the linearity of $bk$. Beyond this value $k$, $F_{b}(n) \leq n$ always. Thus, there are a finite number of narcissistic numbers, and any natural number is guaranteed to reach a periodic point or a fixed point less than $b^{k} - 1$, making it a preperiodic point. Setting $b$ equal to 10 shows that the largest narcissistic number in base 10 must be less than $10^{60}$.

The number of iterations $i$ needed for $F_{b}^{i}(n)$ to reach a fixed point is the narcissistic function's persistence of $n$, and undefined if it never reaches a fixed point.

A base $b$ has at least one two-digit narcissistic number if and only if $b^2 + 1$ is not prime, and the number of two-digit narcissistic numbers in base $b$ equals $\tau(b^2+1)-2$, where $\tau(n)$ is the number of positive divisors of $n$.

Every base $b \geq 3$ that is not a multiple of nine has at least one three-digit narcissistic number. The bases that do not are

2, 72, 90, 108, 153, 270, 423, 450, 531, 558, 630, 648, 738, 1044, 1098, 1125, 1224, 1242, 1287, 1440, 1503, 1566, 1611, 1620, 1800, 1935, ... (sequence A248970 in the OEIS)

There are only 88 narcissistic numbers in base 10, of which the largest is

115,132,219,018,763,992,565,095,597,973,971,522,401

with 39 digits.

== Narcissistic numbers and cycles of F_{b} for specific b ==
All numbers are represented in base $b$. '#' is the length of each known finite sequence.

$b$	Narcissistic numbers	#	Cycles	OEIS sequence(s)
2	0, 1	2	$\varnothing$	
3	0, 1, 2, 12, 22, 122	6	$\varnothing$	
4	0, 1, 2, 3, 130, 131, 203, 223, 313, 332, 1103, 3303	12	$\varnothing$	A010344 and A010343
5	0, 1, 2, 3, 4, 23, 33, 103, 433, 2124, 2403, 3134, 124030, 124031, 242423, 434434444, ...	18	1234 → 2404 → 4103 → 2323 → 1234 3424 → 4414 → 11034 → 20034 → 20144 → 31311 → 3424 1044302 → 2110314 → 1044302 1043300 → 1131014 → 1043300	A010346
6	0, 1, 2, 3, 4, 5, 243, 514, 14340, 14341, 14432, 23520, 23521, 44405, 435152, 5435254, 12222215, 555435035 ...	31	44 → 52 → 45 → 105 → 330 → 130 → 44 13345 → 33244 → 15514 → 53404 → 41024 → 13345 14523 → 32253 → 25003 → 23424 → 14523 2245352 → 3431045 → 2245352 12444435 → 22045351 → 30145020 → 13531231 → 12444435 115531430 → 230104215 → 115531430 225435342 → 235501040 → 225435342	A010348
7	0, 1, 2, 3, 4, 5, 6, 13, 34, 44, 63, 250, 251, 305, 505, 12205, 12252, 13350, 13351, 15124, 36034, 205145, 1424553, 1433554, 3126542, 4355653, 6515652, 125543055, ...	60		A010350
8	0, 1, 2, 3, 4, 5, 6, 7, 24, 64, 134, 205, 463, 660, 661, 40663, 42710, 42711, 60007, 62047, 636703, 3352072, 3352272, ...	63		A010354 and A010351
9	0, 1, 2, 3, 4, 5, 6, 7, 8, 45, 55, 150, 151, 570, 571, 2446, 12036, 12336, 14462, 2225764, 6275850, 6275851, 12742452, ...	59		A010353
10	0, 1, 2, 3, 4, 5, 6, 7, 8, 9, 153, 370, 371, 407, 1634, 8208, 9474, 54748, 92727, 93084, 548834, ...	88		A005188
11	0, 1, 2, 3, 4, 5, 6, 7, 8, 9, A, 56, 66, 105, 307, 708, 966, A06, A64, 8009, 11720, 11721, 12470, ...	135		A0161948
12	0, 1, 2, 3, 4, 5, 6, 7, 8, 9, A, B, 25, A5, 577, 668, A83, 14765, 938A4, 369862, A2394A, ...	88		A161949
13	0, 1, 2, 3, 4, 5, 6, 7, 8, 9, A, B, C, 14, 36, 67, 77, A6, C4, 490, 491, 509, B85, 3964, 22593, 5B350, ...	202		A0161950
14	0, 1, 2, 3, 4, 5, 6, 7, 8, 9, A, B, C, D, 136, 409, 74AB5, 153A632, ...	103		A0161951
15	0, 1, 2, 3, 4, 5, 6, 7, 8, 9, A, B, C, D, E, 78, 88, C3A, D87, 1774, E819, E829, 7995C, 829BB, A36BC, ...	203		A0161952
16	0, 1, 2, 3, 4, 5, 6, 7, 8, 9, A, B, C, D, E, F, 156, 173, 208, 248, 285, 4A5, 5B0, 5B1, 60B, 64B, 8C0, 8C1, 99A, AA9, AC3, CA8, E69, EA0, EA1, B8D2, 13579, 2B702, 2B722, 5A07C, 5A47C, C00E0, C00E1, C04E0, C04E1, C60E7, C64E7, C80E0, C80E1, C84E0, C84E1, ...	294		A161953

== Extension to negative integers ==
Narcissistic numbers can be extended to the negative integers by use of a signed-digit representation to represent each integer.

== See also ==
- Arithmetic dynamics
- Dudeney number
- Factorion
- Happy number
- Kaprekar's constant
- Kaprekar number
- Meertens number
- Perfect digit-to-digit invariant
- Perfect digital invariant
- Sum-product number
