= Meertens number =

Number that is its own Gödel number

In number theory and mathematical logic, a Meertens number in a given number base $b$ is a natural number that is its own Gödel number. It was named after Lambert Meertens by Richard S. Bird as a present during the celebration of his 25 years at the CWI, Amsterdam.

== Definition ==
Let $n$ be a natural number. We define the Meertens function for base $b > 1$ $F_{b} : \mathbb{N} \rightarrow \mathbb{N}$ to be the following:

$$F_{b}(n) = \prod_{i=0}^{k - 1} p_{k - i - 1}^{d_i}.$$

where $k = \lfloor \log_{b}{n} \rfloor + 1$ is the number of digits in the number in base $b$, $p_i$ is the $i$-th prime number (starting at 0), and

$$d_i = \frac{n \bmod{b^{i+1}} - n \bmod b^i}{b^i}$$

is the value of each digit of the number. A natural number $n$ is a Meertens number if it is a fixed point for $F_{b}$, which occurs if $F_{b}(n) = n$. This corresponds to a Gödel encoding.

For example, the number 3020 in base $b = 4$ is a Meertens number, because

$$3020 = 2^{3}3^{0}5^{2}7^{0}$$.

A natural number $n$ is a sociable Meertens number if it is a periodic point for $F_{b}$, where $F_{b}^k(n) = n$ for a positive integer $k$, and forms a cycle of period $k$. A Meertens number is a sociable Meertens number with $k = 1$, and a amicable Meertens number is a sociable Meertens number with $k = 2$.

The number of iterations $i$ needed for $F_{b}^{i}(n)$ to reach a fixed point is the Meertens function's persistence of $n$, and undefined if it never reaches a fixed point.

== Meertens numbers and cycles of F_{b} for specific b ==
All numbers are in base $b$.

$b$	Meertens numbers	Cycles	Comments
2	10, 110, 1010		$n < 2^{96}$
3	101	11 → 20 → 11	$n < 3^{60}$
4	3020	2 → 10 → 2	$n < 4^{48}$
5	11, 3032000, 21302000		$n < 5^{41}$
6	130	12 → 30 → 12	$n < 6^{37}$
7	202		$n < 7^{34}$
8	330		$n < 8^{32}$
9	7810000		$n < 9^{30}$
10	81312000		$n < 10^{29}$
11	$\varnothing$		$n < 11^{44}$
12	$\varnothing$		$n < 12^{40}$
13	$\varnothing$		$n < 13^{39}$
14	13310		$n < 14^{25}$
15	$\varnothing$		$n < 15^{37}$
16	12	2 → 4 → 10 → 2	$n < 16^{24}$

== See also ==
- Arithmetic dynamics
- Dudeney number
- Factorion
- Happy number
- Kaprekar's constant
- Kaprekar number
- Narcissistic number
- Perfect digit-to-digit invariant
- Perfect digital invariant
- Sum-product number
