= Sum-product number =

Number equal to the product of the sum and product of its digits

A sum-product number in a given number base $b$ is a natural number that is equal to the product of the sum of its digits and the product of its digits.

There are a finite number of sum-product numbers in any given base $b$. In base 10, there are exactly four sum-product numbers (sequence A038369 in the OEIS): 0, 1, 135, and 144.

== Definition ==
Let $n$ be a natural number. We define the sum-product function for base $b > 1$, $F_b : \mathbb{N} \rightarrow \mathbb{N}$, to be the following:

$$F_b(n) = \left(\sum_{i = 1}^k d_i\right)\!\!\left(\prod_{j = 1}^k d_j\right)$$

where $k = \lfloor \log_b{n} \rfloor + 1$ is the number of digits in the number in base $b$, and

$$d_i = \frac{n \bmod{b^{i+1}} - n \bmod b^i}{b^i}$$

is the value of each digit of the number. A natural number $n$ is a sum-product number if it is a fixed point for $F_b$, which occurs if $F_b(n) = n$. The natural numbers 0 and 1 are trivial sum-product numbers for all $b$, and all other sum-product numbers are nontrivial sum-product numbers.

For example, the number 144 in base 10 is a sum-product number, because $1 + 4 + 4 = 9$, $1 \times 4 \times 4 = 16$, and $9 \times 16 = 144$.

A natural number $n$ is a sociable sum-product number if it is a periodic point for $F_b$, where $F_b^p(n) = n$ for a positive integer $p$, and forms a cycle of period $p$. A sum-product number is a sociable sum-product number with $p = 1$, and an amicable sum-product number is a sociable sum-product number with $p = 2.$

All natural numbers $n$ are preperiodic points for $F_b$, regardless of the base. This is because for any given digit count $k$, the minimum possible value of $n$ is $b^{k-1}$ and the maximum possible value of $n$ is $b^k - 1 = \sum_{i=0}^{k-1} (b-1)^i.$ The maximum possible digit sum is therefore $k(b-1)$ and the maximum possible digit product is $(b-1)^k.$ Thus, the sum-product function value is $F_b(n) = k(b-1)^{k+1}.$ This suggests that $k(b-1)^{k+1} \geq n \geq b^{k-1},$ or dividing both sides by $(b-1)^{k-1}$, $k(b-1)^2 \geq {\left(\frac{b}{b-1}\right)}^{k-1}.$ Since $\frac{b}{b-1} \geq 1,$ this means that there will be a maximum value $k$ where ${\left(\frac{b}{b-1}\right)}^k \leq k(b-1)^2,$ because of the exponential nature of ${\left(\frac{b}{b-1}\right)}^k$ and the linearity of $k(b-1)^2.$ Beyond this value $k$, $F_b(n) \leq n$ always. Thus, there are a finite number of sum-product numbers, and any natural number is guaranteed to reach a periodic point or a fixed point less than $b^k - 1,$ making it a preperiodic point.

The number of iterations $i$ needed for $F_b^i(n)$ to reach a fixed point is the sum-product function's persistence of $n$, and undefined if it never reaches a fixed point.

Any integer shown to be a sum-product number in a given base must, by definition, also be a Harshad number in that base.

== Extension to negative integers ==
Sum-product numbers can be extended to the negative integers by use of a signed-digit representation to represent each integer.

== Programming example ==
The example below implements the sum-product function described in the definition above to search for sum-product numbers and cycles in Python.

def sum_product(x: int, b: int) -> int:
    """Sum-product number."""
    sum_x = 0
    product = 1
    while x > 0:
        if x % b > 0:
            sum_x = sum_x + x % b
            product = product * (x % b)
        x = x // b
    return sum_x * product

def sum_product_cycle(x: int, b: int) -> list[int]:
    seen = []
    while x not in seen:
        seen.append(x)
        x = sum_product(x, b)
    cycle = []
    while x not in cycle:
        cycle.append(x)
        x = sum_product(x, b)
    return cycle

== See also ==
- Arithmetic dynamics
- Dudeney number
- Factorion
- Happy number
- Kaprekar's constant
- Kaprekar number
- Meertens number
- Narcissistic number
- Perfect digit-to-digit invariant
- Perfect digital invariant
