= Factorion =

Number that is the sum of the factorials of its digits

In number theory, a factorion in a given number base $b$ is a natural number that equals the sum of the factorials of its digits. The name factorion was coined by the author Clifford A. Pickover.

== Definition ==
Let $n$ be a natural number. For a base $b > 1$, we define the sum of the factorials of the digits of $n$, $\operatorname{SFD}_b : \mathbb{N} \rightarrow \mathbb{N}$, to be the following:

$$\operatorname{SFD}_b(n) = \sum_{i=0}^{k - 1} d_i!.$$

where $k = \lfloor \log_b n \rfloor + 1$ is the number of digits in the number in base $b$, $n!$ is the factorial of $n$ and

$$d_i = \frac{n \bmod{b^{i+1}} - n \bmod{b^{i}}}{b^{i}}$$

is the value of the $i$th digit of the number. A natural number $n$ is a $b$-factorion if it is a fixed point for $\operatorname{SFD}_b$, i.e. if $\operatorname{SFD}_b(n) = n$. $1$ and $2$ are fixed points for all bases $b$, and thus are trivial factorions for all $b$, and all other factorions are nontrivial factorions.

For example, the number 145 in base $b = 10$ is a factorion because $145 = 1! + 4! + 5!$.

For $b = 2$, the sum of the factorials of the digits is simply the number of digits $k$ in the base 2 representation since $0! = 1! = 1$.

A natural number $n$ is a sociable factorion if it is a periodic point for $\operatorname{SFD}_b$, where $\operatorname{SFD}_b^c(n) = n$ for a positive integer $c$, and forms a cycle of period $c$. A factorion is a sociable factorion with $c = 1$, and a amicable factorion is a sociable factorion with $c = 2$.

All natural numbers $n$ are preperiodic points for $\operatorname{SFD}_b$, regardless of the base. This is because all natural numbers of base $b$ with $k$ digits satisfy $b^{k-1} \leq n < b^{k}$. Given that each of the $k$ digits is at most $b-1$, $\operatorname{SFD}_b \leq (b-1)!k$. However, when $k \geq b$, then $b^{k-1} > (b-1)!(k)$ for $b > 2$, so any $n$ will satisfy $n > \operatorname{SFD}_b(n)$ until $n < b^b$. There are finitely many natural numbers less than $b^b$, so the number is guaranteed to reach a periodic point or a fixed point less than $b^b$, making it a preperiodic point. For $b = 2$, the number of digits $k \leq n$ for any number, once again, making it a preperiodic point. This means also that there are a finite number of factorions and cycles for any given base $b$.

The number of iterations $i$ needed for $\operatorname{SFD}_b^i(n)$ to reach a fixed point is the $\operatorname{SFD}_b$ function's persistence of $n$, and undefined if it never reaches a fixed point.

== Factorions for SFD_{b} ==
=== b = (m − 1)! ===
Let $m$ be a positive integer and the number base $b = (m - 1)!$. Then:

- $n_1 = mb + 1$ is a factorion for $\operatorname{SFD}_b$ for all $m\geq 4$.
Proof

Let the digits of $n_1 = d_1 b + d_0$ be $d_1 = m$, and $d_0 = 1.$ Then

$\operatorname{SFD}_b(n_1) = d_1! + d_0!$

$$= m! + 1!$$
$$= m(m - 1)! + 1$$
$$= d_1 b + d_0$$
$$= n_1$$

Thus $n_1$ is a factorion for $F_b$ for all $k$.

- $n_2 = mb + 2$ is a factorion for $\operatorname{SFD}_b$ for all $m\geq 4$.
Proof

Let the digits of $n_2 = d_1 b + d_0$ be $d_1 = m$, and $d_0 = 2$. Then

$\operatorname{SFD}_b(n_2) = d_1! + d_0!$

$$= m! + 2!$$
$$= m(m - 1)! + 2$$
$$= d_1 b + d_0$$
$$= n_2$$

Thus $n_2$ is a factorion for $F_b$ for all $k$.

Factorions
$m$	$b$	$n_1$	$n_2$
4	6	41	42
5	24	51	52
6	120	61	62
7	720	71	72

=== b = m! − m + 1 ===
Let $k$ be a positive integer and the number base $b = m! - m + 1$. Then:

- $n_1 = b + m$ is a factorion for $\operatorname{SFD}_b$ for all $m\geq 3$.
Proof

Let the digits of $n_1 = d_1 b + d_0$ be $d_1 = 1$, and $d_0 = m$. Then

$\operatorname{SFD}_b(n_1) = d_1! + d_0!$

$$= 1! + m!$$
$$= m! + 1 - m + m$$
$$= 1(m! - m + 1) + m$$
$$= d_1 b + d_0$$
$$= n_1$$

Thus $n_1$ is a factorion for $F_b$ for all $m$.

Factorions
$m$	$b$	$n_1$
3	4	13
4	21	14
5	116	15
6	715	16

=== Table of factorions and cycles of SFD_{b} ===
All numbers are represented in base $b$.

Base $b$	Nontrivial factorion ($n \neq 1$, $n \neq 2$)	Cycles
2	$\varnothing$	$\varnothing$
3	$\varnothing$	$\varnothing$
4	13	3 → 12 → 3
5	144	$\varnothing$
6	41, 42	$\varnothing$
7	$\varnothing$	36 → 2055 → 465 → 2343 → 53 → 240 → 36
8	$\varnothing$	3 → 6 → 1320 → 12 175 → 12051 → 175
9	62558	
10	145, 40585	871 → 45361 → 871 872 → 45362 → 872 169 → 363601 → 1454 → 169

== See also ==
- Arithmetic dynamics
- Dudeney number
- Happy number
- Kaprekar's constant
- Kaprekar number
- Meertens number
- Narcissistic number
- Perfect digit-to-digit invariant
- Perfect digital invariant
- Sum-product number
