= Kaprekar number =

Base-dependent property of integers

In mathematics, a natural number in a given number base is a $p$-Kaprekar number if the representation of its square in that base can be split into two partitions with the 2nd partition being $p$ digits in length, that add up to the original number. For example, in base 10, 45 is a 2-Kaprekar number, because 45^{2} = 2025, and 20 + 25 = 45. The numbers are named after D. R. Kaprekar.

== Definition and properties ==
Let $n$ be a natural number. Then the Kaprekar function for base $b > 1$ and power $p > 0$ $F_{p, b} : \mathbb{N} \rightarrow \mathbb{N}$ is defined to be the following:

$$F_{p, b}(n) = \alpha + \beta$$,

where $\beta = n^2 \bmod b^p$ and

$$\alpha = \frac{n^2 - \beta}{b^p}$$

It can also be expressed as:

$$F_{p, b}(n) = \left \lfloor \frac{n^2}{b^p} \right \rfloor(1-b^p)+n^2$$

A natural number $n$ is a $p$-Kaprekar number if it is a fixed point for $F_{p, b}$, which occurs if $F_{p, b}(n) = n$. $0$ and $1$ are trivial Kaprekar numbers for all $b$ and $p$, all other Kaprekar numbers are nontrivial Kaprekar numbers.

The earlier example of 45 satisfies this definition with $b = 10$ and $p = 2$, because

$$\beta = n^2 \bmod b^p = 45^2 \bmod 10^2 = 25$$
$$\alpha = \frac{n^2 - \beta}{b^p} = \frac{45^2 - 25}{10^2} = 20$$
$$F_{2, 10}(45) = \alpha + \beta = 20 + 25 = 45$$

A natural number $n$ is a sociable Kaprekar number if it is a periodic point for $F_{p, b}$, where $F_{p, b}^k(n) = n$ for a positive integer $k$ (where $F_{p, b}^k$ is the $k$th iterate of $F_{p, b}$), and forms a cycle of period $k$. A Kaprekar number is a sociable Kaprekar number with $k = 1$, and a amicable Kaprekar number is a sociable Kaprekar number with $k = 2$.

The number of iterations $i$ needed for $F_{p, b}^{i}(n)$ to reach a fixed point is the Kaprekar function's persistence of $n$, and undefined if it never reaches a fixed point.

There are only a finite number of $p$-Kaprekar numbers and cycles for a given base $b$, because if $n = b^p + m$, where $m > 0$ then

$$\begin{align}
n^2 & = (b^p + m)^2 \\
& = b^{2p} + 2mb^p + m^2 \\
& = (b^p + 2m)b^p + m^2 \\
\end{align}$$

and $\beta = m^2$, $\alpha = b^p + 2m$, and $F_{p, b}(n) = b^p + 2m + m^2 = n + (m^2 + m) > n$. Only when $n \leq b^p$ do Kaprekar numbers and cycles exist.

If $d$ is any divisor of $p$, then $n$ is also a $p$-Kaprekar number for base $b^p$.

In base $b = 2$, all even perfect numbers are Kaprekar numbers. More generally, any numbers of the form $2^n (2^{n + 1} - 1)$ or $2^n (2^{n + 1} + 1)$ for natural number $n$ are Kaprekar numbers in base 2.

=== Set-theoretic definition and unitary divisors ===
The set $K(N)$ for a given integer $N$ can be defined as the set of integers $X$ for which there exist natural numbers $A$ and $B$ satisfying the Diophantine equation

$X^2 = AN + B$, where $0 \leq B < N$
$$X = A + B$$

An $n$-Kaprekar number for base $b$ is then one which lies in the set $K(b^n)$.

It was shown in 2000 that there is a bijection between the unitary divisors of $N - 1$ and the set $K(N)$ defined above. Let $\operatorname{Inv}(a, c)$ denote the multiplicative inverse of $a$ modulo $c$, namely the least positive integer $m$ such that $am = 1 \bmod c$, and for each unitary divisor $d$ of $N - 1$ let $e = \frac{N - 1}{d}$ and $\zeta(d) = d\ \text{Inv}(d, e)$. Then the function $\zeta$ is a bijection from the set of unitary divisors of $N - 1$ onto the set $K(N)$. In particular, a number $X$ is in the set $K(N)$ if and only if $X = d\ \text{Inv}(d, e)$ for some unitary divisor $d$ of $N - 1$.

The numbers in $K(N)$ occur in complementary pairs, $X$ and $N - X$. If $d$ is a unitary divisor of $N - 1$ then so is $e = \frac{N - 1}{d}$, and if $X = d\operatorname{Inv}(d, e)$ then $N - X = e\operatorname{Inv}(e, d)$.

== Kaprekar numbers for $F_{p, b}$ ==
=== b = 4k + 3 and p = 2n + 1 ===
Let $k$ and $n$ be natural numbers, the number base $b = 4k + 3 = 2(2k + 1) + 1$, and $p = 2n + 1$. Then:

- $X_1 = \frac{b^p - 1}{2} = (2k + 1) \sum_{i = 0}^{p - 1} b^i$ is a Kaprekar number.
Proof

Let

$$\begin{align}
X_1 & = \frac{b^p - 1}{2} \\
& = \frac{b - 1}{2} \sum_{i = 0}^{p - 1} b^i  \\
& = \frac{4k + 3 - 1}{2} \sum_{i = 0}^{2n + 1 - 1} b^i  \\
& = (2k + 1) \sum_{i = 0}^{2n} b^i
\end{align}$$

Then,

$$\begin{align}
X_1^2 & = \left(\frac{b^p - 1}{2}\right)^2 \\
& = \frac{b^{2p} - 2b^p + 1}{4} \\
& = \frac{b^p(b^p - 2) + 1}{4} \\
& = \frac{(4k + 3)^{2n + 1}(b^p - 2) + 1}{4} \\
& = \frac{(4k + 3)^{2n}(b^p - 2)(4k + 4) - (4k + 3)^{2n}(b^p - 2) + 1}{4} \\
& = \frac{-(4k + 3)^{2n}(b^p - 2) + 1}{4} + (k + 1)(4k + 3)^{2n}(b^p - 2) \\
& = \frac{-(4k + 3)^{2n - 1}(b^p - 2)(4k + 4) + (4k + 3)^{2n - 1}(b^p - 2) + 1}{4} + (k + 1)b^{2n}(b^{2n + 1} - 2) \\
& = \frac{(4k + 3)^{2n - 1}(b^p - 2) + 1}{4} + (k + 1)b^{2n}(b^p - 2) - (k + 1)b^{2n - 1}(b^{2n + 1} - 2) \\
& = \frac{(4k + 3)^{p - 2}(b^p - 2) + 1}{4} + \sum_{i = p - 2}^{p - 1} (-1)^i(k + 1)b^i(b^p - 2) \\
& = \frac{(4k + 3)^{p - 2}(b^p - 2) + 1}{4} + (b^p - 2)(k + 1)\sum_{i = p - 2}^{p - 1} (-1)^i b^i \\
& = \frac{(4k + 3)^{1}(b^p - 2) + 1}{4} + (b^p - 2)(k + 1)\sum_{i = 1}^{p - 1} (-1)^i b^i \\
& = \frac{-(b^p - 2) + 1}{4} + (b^p - 2)(k + 1)\sum_{i = 0}^{p - 1} (-1)^i b^i \\
& = (b^p - 2)(k + 1)\left(\sum_{i = 0}^{2n} (-1)^i b^i\right) + \frac{-b^{2n + 1} + 3}{4} \\
& = (b^p - 2)(k + 1)\left(\sum_{i = 0}^{2n} (-1)^i b^i\right) + \frac{-4b^{2n + 1} + 3b^{2n + 1} + 3}{4} \\
& = (b^p - 2)(k + 1)\left(\sum_{i = 0}^{2n} (-1)^i b^i\right) - b^p + \frac{3b^{2n + 1} + 3}{4} \\
& = (b^p - 2)(k + 1)\left(\sum_{i = 0}^{2n} (-1)^i b^i\right) - b^p + \frac{3(4k + 3)^{p - 2} + 3}{4} + 3(k + 1) \sum_{i = p - 2}^{p - 1} (-1)^i b^i \\
& = (b^p - 2)(k + 1)\left(\sum_{i = 0}^{2n} (-1)^i b^i\right) - b^p + \frac{3(4k + 3)^{1} + 3}{4} + 3(k + 1) \sum_{i = 1}^{p - 1} (-1)^i b^i \\
& = (b^p - 2)(k + 1)\left(\sum_{i = 0}^{2n} (-1)^i b^i\right) - b^p + \frac{-3 + 3}{4} + 3(k + 1) \sum_{i = 0}^{p - 1} (-1)^i b^i \\
& = (b^p - 2)(k + 1)\left(\sum_{i = 0}^{2n} (-1)^i b^i\right) + 3(k + 1)\left(\sum_{i = 0}^{2n} (-1)^i b^i\right) - b^p \\
& = (b^p - 2 + 3)(k + 1)\left(\sum_{i = 0}^{2n} (-1)^i b^i\right) - b^p \\
& = (b^p + 1)(k + 1)\left(\sum_{i = 0}^{2n} (-1)^i b^i\right) - b^p \\
& = (b^p + 1)\left(-1 + (k + 1)\sum_{i = 0}^{2n} (-1)^i b^i\right) + 1 \\
& = (b^p + 1)\left(k + (k + 1)\sum_{i = 1}^{2n} (-1)^i b^i\right) + 1 \\
& = (b^p + 1)\left(k + (k + 1)\sum_{i = 1}^{n} b^{2i} - b^{2i - 1}\right) + 1 \\
& = (b^p + 1)\left(k + (k + 1)\sum_{i = 1}^{n} (b - 1)b^{2i - 1}\right) + 1 \\
& = (b^p + 1)\left(k + \sum_{i = 1}^{n} ((k + 1)b - k - 1)b^{2i - 1}\right) + 1 \\
& = (b^p + 1)\left(k + \sum_{i = 1}^{n} (kb + (4k + 3) - k - 1)b^{2i - 1}\right) + 1 \\
& = (b^p + 1)\left(k + \sum_{i = 1}^{n} (kb + (3k + 2))b^{2i - 1}\right) + 1 \\
& = b^p \left(k + \sum_{i = 1}^{n} (kb + (3k + 2))b^{2i - 1}\right) + \left(k + 1 + \sum_{i = 1}^{n} (kb + (3k + 2))b^{2i - 1}\right)
\end{align}$$

The two numbers $\alpha$ and $\beta$ are

$$\beta = X_1^2 \bmod b^p = k + 1 + \sum_{i = 1}^{n} (kb + (3k + 2))b^{2i - 1}$$
$$\alpha = \frac{X_1^2 - \beta}{b^p} = k + \sum_{i = 1}^{n} (kb + (3k + 2))b^{2i - 1}$$

and their sum is

$$\begin{align}
\alpha + \beta & = \left(k + \sum_{i = 1}^{n} (kb + (3k + 2))b^{2i - 1}\right) + \left(k + 1 + \sum_{i = 1}^{n} (kb + (3k + 2))b^{2i - 1}\right) \\
& = 2k + 1 + \sum_{i = 1}^{n} ((2k)b + 2(3k + 2))b^{2i - 1} \\
& = 2k + 1 + \sum_{i = 1}^{n} ((2k)b + (6k + 4))b^{2i - 1} \\
& = 2k + 1 + \sum_{i = 1}^{n} ((2k)b + (4k + 3))b^{2i - 1} + (2k + 1)b^{2i - 1} \\
& = 2k + 1 + \sum_{i = 1}^{n} ((2k + 1)b)b^{2i - 1} + (2k + 1)b^{2i - 1} \\
& = 2k + 1 + \sum_{i = 1}^{n} (2k + 1)b^{2i} + (2k + 1)b^{2i - 1} \\
& = 2k + 1 + \sum_{i = 1}^{2n} (2k + 1)b^{i} \\
& = \sum_{i = 0}^{2n} (2k + 1)b^{i} \\
& = (2k + 1) \sum_{i = 0}^{2n} b^i
& = X_1 \\
\end{align}$$

Thus, $X_1$ is a Kaprekar number.

- $X_2 = \frac{b^p + 1}{2} = X_1 + 1$ is a Kaprekar number for all natural numbers $n$.
Proof

Let

$$\begin{align}
X_2 & = \frac{b^{2n + 1} + 1}{2} \\
& = \frac{b^{2n + 1} - 1}{2} + 1 \\
& = X_1 + 1
\end{align}$$

Then,

$$\begin{align}
X_2^2 & = (X_1 + 1)^2 \\
& = X_1^2 + 2 X_1 + 1 \\
& = X_1^2 + 2 X_1 + 1 \\
& = b^p \left(k + \sum_{i = 1}^{n} (kb + (3k + 2))b^{2i - 1}\right) + \left(k + 1 + \sum_{i = 1}^{n} (kb + (3k + 2))b^{2i - 1}\right) + b^p - 1 + 1 \\
& = b^p \left(k + 1 + \sum_{i = 1}^{n} (kb + (3k + 2))b^{2i - 1}\right) + \left(k + 1 + \sum_{i = 1}^{n} (kb + (3k + 2))b^{2i - 1}\right)
\end{align}$$

The two numbers $\alpha$ and $\beta$ are

$$\beta = X_2^2 \bmod b^p = k + 1 + \sum_{i = 1}^{n} (kb + (3k + 2))b^{2i - 1}$$
$$\alpha = \frac{X_2^2 - \beta}{b^p} = k + 1 + \sum_{i = 1}^{n} (kb + (3k + 2))b^{2i - 1}$$

and their sum is

$$\begin{align}
\alpha + \beta & = \left(k + 1 + \sum_{i = 1}^{n} (kb + (3k + 2))b^{2i - 1}\right) + \left(k + 1 + \sum_{i = 1}^{n} (kb + (3k + 2))b^{2i - 1}\right) \\
& = 2k + 2 + \sum_{i = 1}^{n} ((2k)b + 2(3k + 2))b^{2i - 1} \\
& = 2k + 2 + \sum_{i = 1}^{n} ((2k)b + (6k + 4))b^{2i - 1} \\
& = 2k + 2 + \sum_{i = 1}^{n} ((2k)b + (4k + 3))b^{2i - 1} + (2k + 1)b^{2i - 1} \\
& = 2k + 2 + \sum_{i = 1}^{n} ((2k + 1)b)b^{2i - 1} + (2k + 1)b^{2i - 1} \\
& = 2k + 2 + \sum_{i = 1}^{n} (2k + 1)b^{2i} + (2k + 1)b^{2i - 1} \\
& = 2k + 2 + \sum_{i = 1}^{2n} (2k + 1)b^{i} \\
& = 1 + \sum_{i = 0}^{2n} (2k + 1)b^{i} \\
& = 1 + (2k + 1) \sum_{i = 0}^{2n} b^{i} \\
& = 1 + X_1 \\
& = X_2
\end{align}$$

Thus, $X_2$ is a Kaprekar number.

=== b = m^{2}k + m + 1 and p = mn + 1 ===
Let $m$, $k$, and $n$ be natural numbers, the number base $b = m^2k + m + 1$, and the power $p = mn + 1$. Then:

- $X_1 = \frac{b^p - 1}{m} = (mk + 1) \sum_{i = 0}^{p - 1} b^i$ is a Kaprekar number.
- $X_2 = \frac{b^p + m - 1}{m} = X_1 + 1$ is a Kaprekar number.

=== b = m^{2}k + m + 1 and p = mn + m − 1 ===
Let $m$, $k$, and $n$ be natural numbers, the number base $b = m^2k + m + 1$, and the power $p = mn + m - 1$. Then:

- $X_1 = \frac{m(b^p - 1)}{4} = (m - 1)(mk + 1) \sum_{i = 0}^{p - 1} b^i$ is a Kaprekar number.
- $X_2 = \frac{mb^p + 1}{4} = X_3 + 1$ is a Kaprekar number.

=== b = m^{2}k + m^{2} − m + 1 and p = mn + 1 ===
Let $m$, $k$, and $n$ be natural numbers, the number base $b = m^2k + m^2 - m + 1$, and the power $p = mn + m - 1$. Then:

- $X_1 = \frac{(m - 1)(b^p - 1)}{m} = (m - 1)(mk + 1) \sum_{i = 0}^{p - 1} b^i$ is a Kaprekar number.
- $X_2 = \frac{(m - 1)b^p + 1}{m} = X_1 + 1$ is a Kaprekar number.

=== b = m^{2}k + m^{2} − m + 1 and p = mn + m − 1 ===
Let $m$, $k$, and $n$ be natural numbers, the number base $b = m^2k + m^2 - m + 1$, and the power $p = mn + m - 1$. Then:

- $X_1 = \frac{b^p - 1}{m} = (mk + 1) \sum_{i = 0}^{p - 1} b^i$ is a Kaprekar number.
- $X_2 = \frac{b^p + m - 1}{m} = X_3 + 1$ is a Kaprekar number.

== Kaprekar numbers and cycles of $F_{p, b}$ for specific $p$, $b$ ==
All numbers are in base $b$.

Base $b$	Power $p$	Nontrivial Kaprekar numbers $n \neq 0$, $n \neq 1$	Cycles
2	1	10	$\varnothing$
3	1	2, 10	$\varnothing$
4	1	3, 10	$\varnothing$
5	1	4, 10	$\varnothing$
6	1	5, 10	$\varnothing$
7	1	3, 4, 6, 10	$\varnothing$
8	1	7, 10	2 → 4 → 2
9	1	8, 10	$\varnothing$
10	1	9, 10	$\varnothing$
11	1	5, 6, A, 10	$\varnothing$
12	1	B, 10	$\varnothing$
13	1	4, 9, C, 10	$\varnothing$
14	1	D, 10	$\varnothing$
15	1	7, 8, E, 10	2 → 4 → 2 9 → B → 9
16	1	6, A, F, 10	$\varnothing$
2	2	11	$\varnothing$
3	2	22, 100	$\varnothing$
4	2	12, 22, 33, 100	$\varnothing$
5	2	14, 31, 44, 100	$\varnothing$
6	2	23, 33, 55, 100	15 → 24 → 15 41 → 50 → 41
7	2	22, 45, 66, 100	$\varnothing$
8	2	34, 44, 77, 100	4 → 20 → 4 11 → 22 → 11 45 → 56 → 45
2	3	111, 1000	10 → 100 → 10
3	3	111, 112, 222, 1000	10 → 100 → 10
2	4	110, 1010, 1111, 10000	$\varnothing$
3	4	121, 2102, 2222, 10000	$\varnothing$
2	5	11111, 100000	10 → 100 → 10000 → 1000 → 10 111 → 10010 → 1110 → 1010 → 111
3	5	11111, 22222, 100000	10 → 100 → 10000 → 1000 → 10
2	6	11100, 100100, 111111, 1000000	100 → 10000 → 100 1001 → 10010 → 1001 100101 → 101110 → 100101
3	6	10220, 20021, 101010, 121220, 202202, 212010, 222222, 1000000	100 → 10000 → 100 122012 → 201212 → 122012
2	7	1111111, 10000000	10 → 100 → 10000 → 10 1000 → 1000000 → 100000 → 1000 100110 → 101111 → 110010 → 1010111 → 1001100 → 111101 → 100110
3	7	1111111, 1111112, 2222222, 10000000	10 → 100 → 10000 → 10 1000 → 1000000 → 100000 → 1000 1111121 → 1111211 → 1121111 → 1111121
2	8	1010101, 1111000, 10001000, 10101011, 11001101, 11111111, 100000000	$\varnothing$
3	8	2012021, 10121020, 12101210, 21121001, 20210202, 22222222, 100000000	$\varnothing$
2	9	10010011, 101101101, 111111111, 1000000000	10 → 100 → 10000 → 100000000 → 10000000 → 100000 → 10 1000 → 1000000 → 1000 10011010 → 11010010 → 10011010

== Extension to negative integers ==
Kaprekar numbers can be extended to the negative integers by use of a signed-digit representation to represent each integer.

== See also ==
- Arithmetic dynamics
- Automorphic number
- Dudeney number
- Factorion
- Happy number
- Kaprekar's constant
- Meertens number
- Narcissistic number
- Perfect digit-to-digit invariant
- Perfect digital invariant
- Sum-product number
