= Perfect digit-to-digit invariant =

Munchausen number

In number theory, a perfect digit-to-digit invariant (PDDI; also known as a Munchausen number) is a natural number in a given number base $b$ that is equal to the sum of its digits each raised to the power of itself. An example in base 10 is 3435, because $3435 = 3^3 + 4^4 + 3^3 + 5^5$. The term "Munchausen number" was coined by Dutch mathematician and software engineer Daan van Berkel in 2009, as this evokes the story of Baron Munchausen raising himself up by his own ponytail because each digit is raised to the power of itself.

== Definition ==
Let $n$ be a natural number which can be written in base $b$ as the k-digit number $d_{k-1}d_{k-2}...d_{1}d_{0}$ where each digit $d_i$ is between $0$ and $b-1$ inclusive, and $n = \sum_{i=0}^{k-1} d_{i}b^{i}$. We define the function $F_b : \mathbb{N} \rightarrow \mathbb{N}$ as $F_b(n) = \sum_{i=0}^{k - 1} {d_i}^{d_i}$. (As 0^{0} is usually undefined, there are typically two conventions used, one where it is taken to be equal to one, and another where it is taken to be equal to zero.) A natural number $n$ is defined to be a perfect digit-to-digit invariant in base b if $F_b(n) = n$. For example, the number 3435 is a perfect digit-to-digit invariant in base 10 because $3^3 + 4^4 + 3^3 + 5^5 = 27 + 256 + 27 + 3125 = 3435$.

$F_b(1) = 1$ for all $b$, and thus 1 is a trivial perfect digit-to-digit invariant in all bases, and all other perfect digit-to-digit invariants are nontrivial. For the second convention where $0^0 = 0$, both $0$ and $1$ are trivial perfect digit-to-digit invariants.

A natural number $n$ is a sociable digit-to-digit invariant if it is a periodic point for $F_{b}$, where $F_{b}^k(n) = n$ for a positive integer $k$, and forms a cycle of period $k$. A perfect digit-to-digit invariant is a sociable digit-to-digit invariant with $k = 1$. An amicable digit-to-digit invariant is a sociable digit-to-digit invariant with $k = 2$.

All natural numbers $n$ are preperiodic points for $F_b$, regardless of the base. This is because all natural numbers of base $b$ with $k$ digits satisfy $b^{k-1} \leq n \leq (k){(b - 1)}^{b-1}$. However, when $k \geq b+1$, then $b^{k-1} > (k){(b - 1)}^{b-1}$, so any $n$ will satisfy $n > F_b(n)$ until $n < b^{b+1}$. There are a finite number of natural numbers less than $b^{b+1}$, so the number is guaranteed to reach a periodic point or a fixed point less than $b^{b+1}$, making it a preperiodic point. This means also that there are a finite number of perfect digit-to-digit invariant and cycles for any given base $b$.

The number of iterations $i$ needed for $F_b^{i}(n)$ to reach a fixed point is the $b$-factorion function's persistence of $n$, and undefined if it never reaches a fixed point.

== Perfect digit-to-digit invariants and cycles of F_{b} for specific b ==
All numbers are represented in base $b$.

=== Convention 0^{0} = 1 ===
Base	Nontrivial perfect digit-to-digit invariants ($n \neq 1$)	Cycles
2	10	$\varnothing$
3	12, 22	2 → 11 → 2
4	131, 313	2 → 10 → 2
5	$\varnothing$	2 → 4 → 2011 → 12 → 10 → 2 104 → 2013 → 113 → 104
6	22352, 23452	4 → 1104 → 1111 → 4 23445 → 24552 → 50054 → 50044 → 24503 → 23445
7	13454	12066 → 536031 → 265204 → 265623 → 551155 → 51310 → 12125 → 12066
8	$\varnothing$	405 → 6466 → 421700 → 3110776 → 6354114 → 142222 → 421 → 405
9	31, 156262, 1656547	
10	3435	
11	18453278, 18453487	
12	3A67A54832	
13	33661, 2AA834668A, 4CA92A233518, 4CA92A233538	
14	23, 26036, 45A0A04513CC, A992B5D96720D	
15	4B1648420DCD0, 5A99E538339A43, 5ACBC41C19E333, 5ACBC41C19E400, 5D0B197C25E056	
16	C4EF722B782C26F, C76712FFC311E6E	
17	33	
18		
19		
20	6534	
21		
22		
23		
24		
25	13, 513	

=== Convention 0^{0} = 0 ===
Base	Nontrivial perfect digit-to-digit invariants ($n \neq 0$, $n \neq 1$)	Cycles
2	$\varnothing$	$\varnothing$
3	12, 22	2 → 11 → 2
4	130, 131, 313	$\varnothing$
5	103, 2024	2 → 4 → 2011 → 11 → 2 9 → 2012 → 9
6	22352, 23452	5 → 22245 → 23413 → 1243 → 1200 → 5 53 → 22332 → 150 → 22250 → 22305 → 22344 → 2311 → 53
7	13454	
8	400, 401	
9	30, 31, 156262, 1647063, 1656547, 34664084	
10	3435, 438579088	
11	$\varnothing$	$\varnothing$
12	3A67A54832	

== Programming examples ==
The following program in Python determines whether an integer number is a Munchausen Number / Perfect Digit to Digit Invariant or not, following the convention $0^0 = 1$.

num = int(input("Enter number:"))
temp = num
s = 0.0
while num > 0:
     digit = num % 10
     num //= 10
     s+= pow(digit, digit)
     
if s == temp:
    print("Munchausen Number")
else:
    print("Not Munchausen Number")

The examples below implement the perfect digit-to-digit invariant function described in the definition above to search for perfect digit-to-digit invariants and cycles in Python for the two conventions.

=== Convention 0^{0} = 1 ===
def pddif(x: int, b: int) -> int:
    total = 0
    while x > 0:
        total = total + pow(x % b, x % b)
        x = x // b
    return total

def pddif_cycle(x: int, b: int) -> list[int]:
    seen = []
    while x not in seen:
        seen.append(x)
        x = pddif(x, b)
    cycle = []
    while x not in cycle:
        cycle.append(x)
        x = pddif(x, b)
    return cycle

=== Convention 0^{0} = 0 ===
def pddif(x: int, b: int) -> int:
    total = 0
    while x > 0:
        if x % b > 0:
            total = total + pow(x % b, x % b)
        x = x // b
    return total

def pddif_cycle(x: int, b: int) -> list[int]:
    seen = []
    while x not in seen:
        seen.append(x)
        x = pddif(x, b)
    cycle = []
    while x not in cycle:
        cycle.append(x)
        x = pddif(x, b)
    return cycle

== See also ==
- Arithmetic dynamics
- Dudeney number
- Factorion
- Happy number
- Kaprekar's constant
- Kaprekar number
- Meertens number
- Narcissistic number
- Perfect digital invariant
- Sum-product number
