= Perfect digital invariant =

Number that is the sum of its own digits, each raised to a given power

In number theory, a perfect digital invariant (PDI) is a number in a given number base ($b$) that is the sum of its own digits each raised to a given power ($p$).

== Definition ==
Let $n$ be a natural number. The perfect digital invariant function (also known as a happy function, from happy numbers) for base $b > 1$ and power $p > 0$ $F_{p, b} : \mathbb{N} \rightarrow \mathbb{N}$ is defined as:

$$F_{p, b}(n) = \sum_{i=0}^{k - 1} d_i^p.$$

where $k = \lfloor \log_{b}{n} \rfloor + 1$ is the number of digits in the number in base $b$, and

$$d_i = \frac{n \bmod{b^{i+1}} - n \bmod b^i}{b^i}$$

is the value of each digit of the number. A natural number $n$ is a perfect digital invariant if it is a fixed point for $F_{p, b}$, which occurs if $F_{p, b}(n) = n$. $0$ and $1$ are trivial perfect digital invariants for all $b$ and $p$, all other perfect digital invariants are nontrivial perfect digital invariants.

For example, the number 4150 in base $b = 10$ is a perfect digital invariant with $p = 5$, because $4150 = 4^5 + 1^5 + 5^5 + 0^5$.

A natural number $n$ is a sociable digital invariant if it is a periodic point for $F_{p, b}$, where $F_{p,b}^k(n) = n$ for a positive integer $k$ (here $F_{p,b}^k$ is the $k$th iterate of $F_{p,b}$), and forms a cycle of period $k$. A perfect digital invariant is a sociable digital invariant with $k = 1$, and a amicable digital invariant is a sociable digital invariant with $k = 2$.

All natural numbers $n$ are preperiodic points for $F_{p, b}$, regardless of the base. This is because if $k \geq p + 2$, $n \geq b^{k-1} > b^p k$, so any $n$ will satisfy $n > F_{b,p}(n)$ until $n < b^{p+1}$. There are a finite number of natural numbers less than $b^{p+1}$, so the number is guaranteed to reach a periodic point or a fixed point less than $b^{p+1}$, making it a preperiodic point.

Numbers in base $b > p$ lead to fixed or periodic points of numbers $n \leq (p - 2)^p + p (b - 1)^p$.

Proof

If $b > p$, then the $n < b^{p+1}$ bound can be reduced. Let $r$ be the number for which the sum of squares of digits is largest among the numbers less than $b^p$.

$$r = b^p - 1 = \sum_{t=0}^p (b - 1)b^t$$
$F_{p, b}(r) = (p + 1)(b - 1)^p < (p + 1) b^p \leq b^{p + 1}$ because $b \geq (p + 1)$

Let $s$ be the number for which the sum of squares of digits is largest among the numbers less than $(p + 1)(b - 1)^p$.

$$s = (p + 1)b^p - 1 = p b^p + \sum_{t=0}^{p - 1} (b - 1)b^t$$
$F_{p, b}(s) = p^p + p (b - 1)^p < p b^p$ because $b \geq p$

Let $t$ be the number for which the sum of squares of digits is largest among the numbers less than $p b^p$.

$$t = (p - 1) b^p + \sum_{t=0}^{p - 1} (b - 1)b^t$$
$$F_{p, b}(t) = (p - 1)^p + p (b - 1)^p$$

Let $u$ be the number for which the sum of squares of digits is largest among the numbers less than $F_{p, b}(t) + 1$.

$$u = (p - 2) b^p + \sum_{t=0}^{p - 1} (b - 1)b^t$$
$$F_{p, b}(u) = (p - 2)^p + p (b - 1)^p < (p - 1)^p + p (b - 1)^p = n_{\ell+1}$$

$u \leq F_{p, b}(u) < F_{p, b}(t)$. Thus, numbers in base $b > p$ lead to cycles or fixed points of numbers $n \leq F_{p, b}(u) = (p - 1)^p + p (b - 1)^p$.

The number of iterations $i$ needed for $F_{p,b}^{i}(n)$ to reach a fixed point is the perfect digital invariant function's persistence of $n$, and undefined if it never reaches a fixed point.

$F_{1, b}$ is the digit sum. The only perfect digital invariants are the single-digit numbers in base $b$, and there are no periodic points with prime period greater than 1.

$F_{p, 2}$ reduces to $F_{1, 2}$, as for any power $p$, $0^p = 0$ and $1^p = 1$.

For every natural number $k > 1$, if $p < b$, $(b - 1) \equiv 0 \bmod k$ and $(p - 1) \equiv 0 \bmod \phi(k)$, then for every natural number $n$, if $n \equiv m \bmod k$, then $F_{p, b}(n) \equiv m \bmod k$, where $\phi(k)$ is Euler's totient function.

Proof

Let

$$n = \sum_{i = 0}^j d_i b^i$$

be a natural number with $j$ digits, where $0 \leq d_i < b$, and $(b - 1) \equiv 0 \bmod k$, where $k$ is a natural number greater than 1.

According to the divisibility rules of base $b$, if $b - 1 \equiv 0 \bmod k$, then if $n \equiv m \bmod k$, then the digit sum

$$F_{1, b}(n) = \sum_{i = 0}^j d_i \equiv m \bmod k$$

If a digit $d_i \equiv m \bmod k$, then $d_i^p \equiv m^p \bmod k$. According to Euler's theorem, if $(p - 1) \equiv 0 \bmod \phi(k)$, $m^p \bmod k = m \bmod k$. Thus, if the digit sum $F_{1, b}(n) \equiv m \bmod k$, then $F_{p, b}(n) \equiv m \bmod k$.

Therefore, for any natural number $k$, if $p < b$, $(b - 1) \equiv 0 \bmod k$ and $(p - 1) \equiv 0 \bmod \phi(k)$, then for every natural number $n$, if $n \equiv m \bmod k$, then $F_{p, b}(n) \equiv m \bmod k$.

No upper bound can be determined for the size of perfect digital invariants in a given base and arbitrary power, and it is not currently known whether or not the number of perfect digital invariants for an arbitrary base is finite or infinite.

== F_{2,b} ==
By definition, any three-digit perfect digital invariant $n = d_2 d_1 d_0$ for $F_{2, b}$ with natural number digits $0 \leq d_0 < b$, $0 \leq d_1 < b$, $0 \leq d_2 < b$ has to satisfy the cubic Diophantine equation $d_0^2 + d_1^2 + d_2^2 = d_2 b^2 + d_1 b + d_0$. $d_2$ has to be equal to 0 or 1 for any $b > 2$, because the maximum value $n$ can take is $n = (2 - 1)^2 + 2 (b - 1)^2 = 1 + 2 (b - 1)^2 < 2 b^2$. As a result, there are actually two related quadratic Diophantine equations to solve:

$d_0^2 + d_1^2 = d_1 b + d_0$ when $d_2 = 0$, and
$d_0^2 + d_1^2 + 1 = b^2 + d_1 b + d_0$ when $d_2 = 1$.

The two-digit natural number $n = d_1 d_0$ is a perfect digital invariant in base

$$b = d_1 + \frac{d_0 (d_0 - 1)}{d_1}.$$

This can be proven by taking the first case, where $d_2 = 0$, and solving for $b$. This means that for some values of $d_0$ and $d_1$, $n$ is not a perfect digital invariant in any base, as $d_1$ is not a divisor of $d_0 (d_0 - 1)$. Moreover, $d_0 > 1$, because if $d_0 = 0$ or $d_0 = 1$, then $b = d_1$, which contradicts the earlier statement that $0 \leq d_1 < b$.

There are no three-digit perfect digital invariants for $F_{2, b}$, which can be proven by taking the second case, where $d_2 = 1$, and letting $d_0 = b - a_0$ and $d_1 = b - a_1$. Then the Diophantine equation for the three-digit perfect digital invariant becomes

$$(b - a_0)^2 + (b - a_1)^2 + 1 = b^2 + (b - a_1) b + (b - a_0)$$
$$b^2 - 2 a_0 b + a_0^2 + b^2 - 2 a_1 b + a_1^2 + 1 = b^2 + (b - a_1) b + (b - a_0)$$
$$2 b^2 - 2 (a_0 + a_1) b + a_0^2 + a_1^2 + 1 = b^2 + (b - a_1) b + (b - a_0)$$
$$b^2 + (b - 2 (a_0 + a_1)) b + a_0^2 + a_1^2 + 1 = b^2 + (b - a_1) b + (b - a_0)$$

$2 (a_0 + a_1) > a_1$ for all values of $0 < a_1 \leq b$. Thus, there are no solutions to the Diophantine equation, and there are no three-digit perfect digital invariants for $F_{2, b}$.

== F_{3,b} ==
There are just four numbers, after unity, which are the sums of the cubes of their digits:

$$153=1^3+5^3+3^3$$
$$370=3^3+7^3+0^3$$
$$371=3^3+7^3+1^3$$
$$407=4^3+0^3+7^3.$$

These are odd facts, very suitable for puzzle columns and likely to amuse amateurs, but there is nothing in them which appeals to the mathematician. (sequence A046197 in the OEIS)
— G. H. Hardy, A Mathematician's Apology

By definition, any four-digit perfect digital invariant $n$ for $F_{3, b}$ with natural number digits $0 \leq d_0 < b$, $0 \leq d_1 < b$, $0 \leq d_2 < b$, $0 \leq d_3 < b$ has to satisfy the quartic Diophantine equation $d_0^3 + d_1^3 + d_2^3 + d_3^3 = d_3 b^3 + d_2 b^2 + d_1 b + d_0$. $d_3$ has to be equal to 0, 1, 2 for any $b > 3$, because the maximum value $n$ can take is $n = (3 - 2)^3 + 3 (b - 1)^3 = 1 + 3 (b - 1)^3 < 3 b^3$. As a result, there are actually three related cubic Diophantine equations to solve

$d_0^3 + d_1^3 + d_2^3 = d_2 b^2 + d_1 b + d_0$ when $d_3 = 0$
$d_0^3 + d_1^3 + d_2^3 + 1 = b^3 + d_2 b^2 + d_1 b + d_0$ when $d_3 = 1$
$d_0^3 + d_1^3 + d_2^3 + 8 = 2 b^3 + d_2 b^2 + d_1 b + d_0$ when $d_3 = 2$

We take the first case, where $d_3 = 0$.

=== b = 3k + 1 ===
Let $k$ be a positive integer and the number base $b = 3 k + 1$. Then:

- $n_1 = kb^2 + (2k + 1)b$ is a perfect digital invariant for $F_{3, b}$ for all $k$.
Proof

Let the digits of $n_1 = d_2 b^2 + d_1 b + d_0$ be $d_2 = k$, $d_1 = 2k + 1$, and $d_0 = 0$. Then

$$\begin{align}
F_{3, b}(n_1) & = d_0^3 + d_1^3 + d_2^3 \\
& = k^3 + (2k + 1)^3 + 0^3 \\
& = (k^2 - k(2k + 1) + (2k + 1)^2)(k + (2k + 1)) \\
& = (k^2 - 2k^2 - k + 4k^2 + 4k + 1)(3k + 1) \\
& = (3k^2 + 3k + 1)(3k + 1) \\
& = (3k^2 + 4k + 1)(3k + 1) - k(3k + 1) \\
& = (k + 1)(3k + 1)(3k + 1) - k(3k + 1) \\
& = k(3k + 1)(3k + 1) + (3k + 1)(3k + 1) - k(3k + 1) \\
& = k(3k + 1)^2 + (2k + 1)(3k + 1) + 0 \\
& = d_2 b^2 + d_1 b + d_0 \\
& = n_1
\end{align}$$

Thus $n_1$ is a perfect digital invariant for $F_{3, b}$ for all $k$.

- $n_2 = kb^2 + (2k + 1)b + 1$ is a perfect digital invariant for $F_{3, b}$ for all $k$.
Proof

Let the digits of $n_2 = d_2 b^2 + d_1 b + d_0$ be $d_2 = k$, $d_1 = 2k + 1$, and $d_0 = 1$. Then

$$\begin{align}
F_{3, b}(n_2) & = d_0^3 + d_1^3 + d_2^3 \\
& = k^3 + (2k + 1)^3 + 1^3 \\
& = (k^2 - k(2k + 1) + (2k + 1)^2)(k + (2k + 1)) + 1 \\
& = (k^2 - 2k^2 - k + 4k^2 + 4k + 1)(3k + 1) + 1 \\
& = (3k^2 + 3k + 1)(3k + 1) + 1 \\
& = (3k^2 + 4k + 1)(3k + 1) - k(3k + 1) + 1 \\
& = (k + 1)(3k + 1)(3k + 1) - k(3k + 1) + 1 \\
& = k(3k + 1)(3k + 1) + (3k + 1)(3k + 1) - k(3k + 1) + 1 \\
& = k(3k + 1)^2 + (2k + 1)(3k + 1) + 1 \\
& = d_2 b^2 + d_1 b + d_0 \\
& = n_2
\end{align}$$

Thus $n_2$ is a perfect digital invariant for $F_{3, b}$ for all $k$.

- $n_3 = (k + 1)b^2 + (2k + 1)$ is a perfect digital invariant for $F_{3, b}$ for all $k$.
Proof

Let the digits of $n_3 = d_2 b^2 + d_1 b + d_0$ be $d_2 = k + 1$, $d_1 = 0$, and $d_0 = 2k + 1$. Then

$$\begin{align}
F_{3, b}(n_3) & = d_0^3 + d_1^3 + d_2^3 \\
& = (k + 1)^3 + 0^3 + (2k + 1)^3 \\
& = ((k + 1)^2 - (k + 1)(2k + 1) + (2k + 1)^2)((k + 1) + (2k + 1)) \\
& = ((k + 1)^2 + k(2k + 1)(3k + 2) \\
& = (k^2 + 2k + 1 + 2k^2 + k)(3k + 2) \\
& = (3k^2 + 3k + 1)(3k + 2) \\
& = (3k^2 + 3k)(3k + 2) + (3k + 2) \\
& = 3k(k + 1)(3k + 2) + (3k + 2) \\
& = (k + 1)((3k + 1)^2 - 1) + (3k + 2) \\
& = (k + 1)(3k + 1)^2 - (k + 1) + (3k + 2) \\
& = (k + 1)(3k + 1)^2 + 0(3k + 1) + (2k + 1) \\
& = d_2 b^2 + d_1 b + d_0 \\
& = n_3
\end{align}$$

Thus $n_3$ is a perfect digital invariant for $F_{3, b}$ for all $k$.

Perfect digital invariants
$k$	$b$	$n_1$	$n_2$	$n_3$
1	4	130	131	203
2	7	250	251	305
3	10	370	371	407
4	13	490	491	509
5	16	5B0	5B1	60B
6	19	6D0	6D1	70D
7	22	7F0	7F1	80F
8	25	8H0	8H1	90H
9	28	9J0	9J1	A0J

=== b = 3k + 2 ===
Let $k$ be a positive integer and the number base $b = 3 k + 2$. Then:

- $n_1 = kb^2 + (2k + 1)$ is a perfect digital invariant for $F_{3, b}$ for all $k$.
Proof

Let the digits of $n_1 = d_2 b^2 + d_1 b + d_0$ be $d_2 = k$, $d_1 = 2k + 1$, and $d_0 = 0$. Then

$F_{3, b}(n_1) = d_0^3 + d_1^3 + d_2^3$

$$= k^3 + 0^3 + (2k + 1)^3$$
$$= (k^2 - k(2k + 1) + (2k + 1)^2)(k + (2k + 1))$$
$$= (k^2 - 2k^2 - k + 4k^2 + 4k + 1)(3k + 1)$$
$$= (3k^2 + 3k + 1)(3k + 1)$$
$$= (3k^2 + 3k + 1)(3k + 2) - (3k^2 + 3k + 1)$$
$$= (3k^2 + 3k + 1)(3k + 2) - (3k^2 + 2k + k + 1)$$
$$= (3k^2 + 3k + 1)(3k + 2) - k(3k + 2) - (k + 1)$$
$$= (3k^2 + 2k + 1)(3k + 2) - (k + 1)$$
$$= (3k^2 + 2k)(3k + 2) + (3k + 2) - (k + 1)$$
$$= k(3k + 2)^2 + (2k + 1)$$
$$= d_2 b^2 + d_1 b + d_0$$
$$= n_1$$

Thus $n_1$ is a perfect digital invariant for $F_{3, b}$ for all $k$.

Perfect digital invariants
$k$	$b$	$n_1$
1	5	103
2	8	205
3	11	307
4	14	409
5	17	50B
6	20	60D
7	23	70F
8	26	80H
9	29	90J

=== b = 6k + 4 ===
Let $k$ be a positive integer and the number base $b = 6 k + 4$. Then:

- $n_4 = kb^2 + (3k + 2)b + (2k + 1)$ is a perfect digital invariant for $F_{3, b}$ for all $k$.
Proof

Let the digits of $n_4 = d_2 b^2 + d_1 b + d_0$ be $d_2 = k + 1$, $d_1 = 3k + 2$, and $d_0 = 2k + 1$. Then

$F_{3, b}(n_3) = d_0^3 + d_1^3 + d_2^3$

$$= (k)^3 + (3k + 2)^3 + (2k + 1)^3$$
$$= k^3 + ((3k + 2)^2 - (3k + 2)(2k + 1) + (2k + 1)^2)((3k + 2) + (2k + 1))$$
$$= k^3 + ((3k + 2)(k + 1) + (2k + 1)^2)(5k + 3)$$
$$= k^3 + (3k^2 + 5k + 2 + 4k^2 + 4k + 1)(5k + 3)$$
$$= k^3 + (7k^2 + 9k + 3)(5k + 3)$$
$$= k^3 + 5k(7k^2 + 9k + 3) + 3(7k^2 + 9k + 3)$$
$$= k^3 + 35k^3 + 45k^2 + 15k + 21k^2 + 27k + 9$$
$$= 36k^3 + 66k^2 + 42k + 9$$
$$= (6k + 4)(6k^2) + 42k^2 + 42k + 9$$
$$= (6k + 4)(6k^2) + (6k + 4)(4k^2) + 18k^2 + 26k + 9$$
$$= (6k + 4)(6k^2 + 4k) + 18k^2 + 26k + 9$$
$$= k(6k + 4)^2 + (6k + 4)(3k) + 14k + 9$$
$$= k(6k + 4)^2 + (3k + 2)(6k + 4) + 2k + 1$$
$$= d_2 b^2 + d_1 b + d_0$$
$$= n_4$$

Thus $n_4$ is a perfect digital invariant for $F_{3, b}$ for all $k$.

Perfect digital invariants
$k$	$b$	$n_4$
0	4	021
1	10	153
2	16	285
3	22	3B7
4	28	4E9

== F_{p,b} ==
All numbers are represented in base $b$.

$p$	$b$	Nontrivial perfect digital invariants	Cycles
2	3	12, 22	2 → 11 → 2
2	4	$\varnothing$	$\varnothing$
2	5	23, 33	4 → 31 → 20 → 4
2	6	$\varnothing$	5 → 41 → 25 → 45 → 105 → 42 → 32 → 21 → 5
2	7	13, 34, 44, 63	2 → 4 → 22 → 11 → 2 16 → 52 → 41 → 23 → 16
2	8	24, 64	4 → 20 → 4 5 → 31 → 12 → 5 15 → 32 → 15
2	9	45, 55	58 → 108 → 72 → 58 75 → 82 → 75
2	10	$\varnothing$	4 → 16 → 37 → 58 → 89 → 145 → 42 → 20 → 4
2	11	56, 66	5 → 23 → 12 → 5 68 → 91 → 75 → 68
2	12	25, A5	5 → 21 → 5 8 → 54 → 35 → 2A → 88 → A8 → 118 → 56 → 51 → 22 → 8 18 → 55 → 42 → 18 68 → 84 → 68
2	13	14, 36, 67, 77, A6, C4	28 → 53 → 28 79 → A0 → 79 98 → B2 → 98
2	14	$\varnothing$	1B → 8A → BA → 11B → 8B → D3 → CA → 136 → 34 → 1B 29 → 61 → 29
2	15	78, 88	2 → 4 → 11 → 2 8 → 44 → 22 → 8 15 → 1B → 82 → 48 → 55 → 35 → 24 → 15 2B → 85 → 5E → EB → 162 → 2B 4E → E2 → D5 → CE → 17A → A0 → 6A → 91 → 57 → 4E 9A → C1 → 9A D6 → DA → 12E → D6
2	16	$\varnothing$	D → A9 → B5 → 92 → 55 → 32 → D
3	3	122	2 → 22 → 121 → 101 → 2
3	4	20, 21, 130, 131, 203, 223, 313, 332	$\varnothing$
3	5	103, 433	14 → 230 → 120 → 14
3	6	243, 514, 1055	13 → 44 → 332 → 142 → 201 → 13
3	7	12, 22, 250, 251, 305, 505	2 → 11 → 2 13 → 40 → 121 → 13 23 → 50 → 236 → 506 → 665 → 1424 → 254 → 401 → 122 → 23 51 → 240 → 132 → 51 160 → 430 → 160 161 → 431 → 161 466 → 1306 → 466 516 → 666 → 1614 → 552 → 516
3	8	134, 205, 463, 660, 661	662 → 670 → 1057 → 725 → 734 → 662
3	9	30, 31, 150, 151, 570, 571, 1388	38 → 658 → 1147 → 504 → 230 → 38 152 → 158 → 778 → 1571 → 572 → 578 → 1308 → 660 → 530 → 178 → 1151 → 152 638 → 1028 → 638 818 → 1358 → 818
3	10	153, 370, 371, 407	55 → 250 → 133 → 55 136 → 244 → 136 160 → 217 → 352 → 160 919 → 1459 → 919
3	11	32, 105, 307, 708, 966, A06, A64	3 → 25 → 111 → 3 9 → 603 → 201 → 9 A → 82A → 1162 → 196 → 790 → 895 → 1032 → 33 → 4A → 888 → 1177 → 576 → 5723 → A3 → 8793 → 1210 → A 25A → 940 → 661 → 364 → 25A 366 → 388 → 876 → 894 → A87 → 1437 → 366 49A → 1390 → 629 → 797 → 1077 → 575 → 49A
3	12	577, 668, A83, 11AA	
3	13	490, 491, 509, B85	13 → 22 → 13
3	14	136, 409	
3	15	C3A, D87	
3	16	23, 40, 41, 156, 173, 208, 248, 285, 4A5, 580, 581, 60B, 64B, 8C0, 8C1, 99A, AA9, AC3, CA8, E69, EA0, EA1	
4	3	$\varnothing$	121 → 200 → 121 122 → 1020 → 122
4	4	1103, 3303	3 → 1101 → 3
4	5	2124, 2403, 3134	1234 → 2404 → 4103 → 2323 → 1234 2324 → 2434 → 4414 → 11034 → 2324 3444 → 11344 → 4340 → 4333 → 3444
4	6	$\varnothing$	
4	7	$\varnothing$	
4	8	20, 21, 400, 401, 420, 421	
4	9	432, 2466	
5	3	1020, 1021, 2102, 10121	$\varnothing$
5	4	200	3 → 3303 → 23121 → 10311 → 3312 → 20013 → 10110 → 3 3311 → 13220 → 10310 → 3311

== Extension to negative integers ==
Perfect digital invariants can be extended to the negative integers by use of a signed-digit representation to represent each integer.

=== Balanced ternary ===
In balanced ternary, the digits are 1, −1 and 0. This results in the following:

- With odd powers $p \equiv 1 \bmod 2$, $F_{p, \text{bal}3}$ reduces down to digit sum iteration, as $(-1)^p = -1$, $0^p = 0$ and $1^p = 1$.
- With even powers $p \equiv 0 \bmod 2$, $F_{p, \text{bal}3}$ indicates whether the number is even or odd, as the sum of each digit will indicate divisibility by 2 if and only if the sum of digits ends in 0. As $0^p = 0$ and $(-1)^p = 1^p = 1$, for every pair of digits 1 or −1, their sum is 0 and the sum of their squares is 2.

== Relation to happy numbers ==
A happy number $n$ for a given base $b$ and a given power $p$ is a preperiodic point for the perfect digital invariant function $F_{p, b}$ such that the $m$-th iteration of $F_{p, b}$ is equal to the trivial perfect digital invariant $1$, and an unhappy number is one such that there exists no such $m$.

== Programming example ==
The example below implements the perfect digital invariant function described in the definition above to search for perfect digital invariants and cycles in Python. This can be used to find happy numbers.

def pdif(x: int, p: int, b: int) -> int:
    """Perfect digital invariant function."""
    total = 0
    while x > 0:
        total = total + pow(x % b, p)
        x = x // b
    return total

def pdif_cycle(x: int, p: int, b: int) -> list[int]:
    seen = []
    while x not in seen:
        seen.append(x)
        x = pdif(x, p, b)
    cycle = []
    while x not in cycle:
        cycle.append(x)
        x = pdif(x, p, b)
    return cycle

== See also ==
- Arithmetic dynamics
- Dudeney number
- Factorion
- Happy number
- Kaprekar's constant
- Kaprekar number
- Meertens number
- Narcissistic number
- Perfect digit-to-digit invariant
- Sum-product number
