= Quartal =

Quartal may refer to:

- Quartal harmony, music featuring chords built from fourths
- Quaternary numeral system, a system for representing numbers based on powers of four
- a quarter of a calendar year (e.g. Q1-4)
