= Persistence of a number =

Property of a number

In mathematics, the persistence of a number is the number of times one must apply a given operation to an integer before reaching a fixed point at which the operation no longer alters the number.

Usually, this involves additive or multiplicative persistence of a non-negative integer, which is how often one has to replace the number by the sum or product of its digits until one reaches a single digit. Because the numbers are broken down into their digits, the additive or multiplicative persistence depends on the radix. In the remainder of this article, base ten is assumed.

The single-digit final state reached in the process of calculating an integer's additive persistence is its digital root. Put another way, a number's additive persistence counts how many times we must sum its digits to arrive at its digital root.

== Examples ==
The additive persistence of 2718 is 2: first we find that 2 + 7 + 1 + 8 = 18, and then that 1 + 8 = 9. The multiplicative persistence of 39 is 3, because it takes three steps to reduce 39 to a single digit: 39 → 27 → 14 → 4. Also, 39 is the smallest number of multiplicative persistence 3.

== Smallest numbers of a given multiplicative persistence ==
In base 10, there is thought to be no number with a multiplicative persistence greater than 11; this is known to be true for numbers up to 2.67×10^{30000}. The smallest numbers with persistence 0, 1, 2, ... are:

0, 10, 25, 39, 77, 679, 6788, 68889, 2677889, 26888999, 3778888999, 277777788888899. (sequence A003001 in the OEIS)

The search for these numbers can be sped up by using additional properties of the decimal digits of these record-breaking numbers. These digits must be in increasing order (with the exception of the second number, 10), and – except for the first two digits – all digits must be 7, 8, or 9. There are also additional restrictions on the first two digits. Based on these restrictions, the number of candidates for n-digit numbers with record-breaking persistence is only proportional to the square of n, a tiny fraction of all possible n-digit numbers. However, any number that is missing from the sequence above would have multiplicative persistence > 11; such numbers are believed not to exist, and would need to have over 30,000 digits if they do exist.

== Properties of additive persistence ==
- The additive persistence of a number is smaller than or equal to the number itself, with equality only when the number is zero.
- For base $b$ and natural numbers $k$ and $n>9$ the numbers $n$ and $n \cdot b^k$ have the same additive persistence.

More about the additive persistence of a number can be found here.

== Smallest numbers of a given additive persistence ==
The additive persistence of a number, however, can become arbitrarily large (proof: for a given number $n$, the persistence of the number consisting of $n$ repetitions of the digit 1 is 1 higher than that of $n$). The smallest numbers of additive persistence 0, 1, 2, ... are:

0, 10, 19, 199, 19999999999999999999999, ... (sequence A006050 in the OEIS)

The next number in the sequence (the smallest number of additive persistence 5) is 2 × 10^{2×(10^{22} − 1)/9} − 1 (that is, 1 followed by 2222222222222222222222 9's). For any fixed base, the sum of the digits of a number is at most proportional to its logarithm; therefore, the additive persistence is at most proportional to the iterated logarithm, and the smallest number of a given additive persistence grows tetrationally.

== Functions with limited persistence ==
Some functions only allow persistence up to a certain degree.

For example, the function which takes the minimal digit only allows for persistence 0 or 1, as you either start with or step to a single-digit number.

== Literature ==
- Guy, Richard K. (2004). Unsolved problems in number theory (3rd ed.). Springer-Verlag. pp. 398–399. ISBN 978-0-387-20860-2. Zbl 1058.11001.
- Meimaris, Antonios (2015). On the additive persistence of a number in base p. Preprint.
