= Periodic sequence =

Sequence for which the same terms are repeated over and over

In mathematics, a periodic sequence (sometimes called a cycle or orbit) is a sequence for which the same terms are repeated over and over:

a_{1}, a_{2}, ..., a_{p}, a_{1}, a_{2}, ..., a_{p}, a_{1}, a_{2}, ..., a_{p}, ...

The number p of repeated terms is called the period (period).

== Definition ==
A (purely) periodic sequence (with period p), or a p-periodic sequence, is a sequence a_{1}, a_{2}, a_{3}, ... satisfying

a_{n+p} = a_{n}

for all values of n. If a sequence is regarded as a function whose domain is the set of natural numbers, then a periodic sequence is simply a special type of periodic function. The smallest p for which a periodic sequence is p-periodic is called its least period or exact period.

== Examples ==
Every constant function is 1-periodic.

The sequence $1,2,1,2,1,2\dots$ is periodic with least period 2.

The sequence of digits in the decimal expansion of 1/7 is periodic with period 6:

$$\frac{1}{7} = 0.142857\,142857\,142857\,\ldots$$

More generally, the sequence of digits in the decimal expansion of any rational number is eventually periodic (see below).

The sequence of powers of −1 is periodic with period two:

$$-1,1,-1,1,-1,1,\ldots$$

More generally, the sequence of powers of any root of unity is periodic. The same holds true for the powers of any element of finite order in a group. Every periodic sequence of numbers can be written as a polynomial $p(x)$, evaluated at the powers of a root of unity: $a_i=p(z^i)$ where $z$ is a root of unity whose order is the period of the sequence.

A periodic point for a function f : X → X is a point x whose orbit

$$x,\, f(x),\, f(f(x)),\, f^3(x),\, f^4(x),\, \ldots$$

is a periodic sequence. Here, $f^n(x)$ means the n-fold composition of f applied to x. Periodic points are important in the theory of dynamical systems. Every function from a finite set to itself has a periodic point; cycle detection is the algorithmic problem of finding such a point.

== Partial sums and products ==
$$\sum_{n=1}^{kp+m} a_{n} = k*\sum_{n=1}^{p} a_{n} + \sum_{n=1}^{m} a_{n}, \qquad \prod_{n=1}^{kp+m} a_{n} = \biggl({\prod_{n=1}^{p} a_{n}}\biggr)^k \cdot \prod_{n=1}^{m} a_{n}$$,

where $m < p$ and $k$ are positive integers.

== Periodic 0, 1 sequences ==
Any periodic sequence can be constructed by element-wise addition, subtraction, multiplication and division of periodic sequences consisting of zeros and ones. Periodic zero and one sequences can be expressed as sums of trigonometric functions:

$$\sum_{k=0}^0 \cos \left(2\pi\frac{nk}{1}\right)/1 = 1,1,1,1,1,1,1,1,1, \cdots$$

$$\sum_{k=0}^{1} \cos \left(2\pi\frac{nk}{2}\right)/2 = 1,0,1,0,1,0,1,0,1,0, \cdots$$

$$\sum_{k=0}^{2} \cos \left(2\pi\frac{nk}{3}\right)/3 = 1, 0,0,1,0,0,1,0,0,1,0,0,1,0,0, \cdots$$

$$\cdots$$

$$\sum_{k=0}^{N-1} \cos \left(2\pi\frac{nk}{N}\right)/N = 1,0,0,0,\cdots,1, \cdots
\quad \text{sequence with period } N$$

One standard approach for proving these identities is to apply De Moivre's formula to the corresponding root of unity. Such sequences are foundational in the study of number theory.

== Generalizations ==
A sequence is eventually periodic or ultimately periodic if it can be made periodic by dropping some finite number of terms from the beginning. Equivalently, the last condition can be stated as $a_{k+r} = a_k$ for some r and sufficiently large k. For example, the sequence of digits in the decimal expansion of 1/56 is eventually periodic:

1 / 56 = 0 . 0 1 7 8 5 7 1 4 2 8 5 7 1 4 2 8 5 7 1 4 2 ...

A sequence is asymptotically periodic if its terms approach those of a periodic sequence. That is, the sequence x_{1}, x_{2}, x_{3}, ... is asymptotically periodic if there exists a periodic sequence a_{1}, a_{2}, a_{3}, ... for which

$\lim_{n\rightarrow\infty} x_n - a_n = 0.$

For example, the sequence

1 / 3, 2 / 3, 1 / 4, 3 / 4, 1 / 5, 4 / 5, ...

is asymptotically periodic, since its terms approach those of the periodic sequence 0, 1, 0, 1, 0, 1, ....
