= Quaternary numeral system =

Base-4 numeral system

Quaternary /kwəˈtɜːrnəri/ is a numeral system with four as its base. It uses the digits 0, 1, 2, and 3 to represent any real number. Conversion from binary is straightforward.

Four is the largest number within the subitizing range and one of two numbers that is both a square and a highly composite number (the other being thirty-six), making quaternary a convenient choice for a base at this scale. Despite being twice as large, its radix economy is equal to that of binary. However, it fares no better in the localization of prime numbers (the smallest better base being the primorial base six, senary).

Quaternary shares with all fixed-radix numeral systems many properties, such as the ability to represent any real number with a canonical representation (almost unique) and the characteristics of the representations of rational numbers and irrational numbers. See decimal and binary for a discussion of these properties.

== Relation to other positional number systems ==
Numbers zero to sixty-four in standard quaternary (0 to 1000)
Decimal	0	1	2	3	4	5	6	7	8	9	10	11	12	13	14	15
Binary	0	1	10	11	100	101	110	111	1,000	1,001	1,010	1,011	1,100	1,101	1,110	1,111
Quaternary	0	1	2	3	10	11	12	13	20	21	22	23	30	31	32	33
Octal	0	1	2	3	4	5	6	7	10	11	12	13	14	15	16	17
Hexadecimal	0	1	2	3	4	5	6	7	8	9	A	B	C	D	E	F
Decimal	16	17	18	19	20	21	22	23	24	25	26	27	28	29	30	31
Binary	10,000	10,001	10,010	10,011	10,100	10,101	10,110	10,111	11,000	11,001	11,010	11,011	11,100	11,101	11,110	11,111
Quaternary	100	101	102	103	110	111	112	113	120	121	122	123	130	131	132	133
Octal	20	21	22	23	24	25	26	27	30	31	32	33	34	35	36	37
Hexadecimal	10	11	12	13	14	15	16	17	18	19	1A	1B	1C	1D	1E	1F
Decimal	32	33	34	35	36	37	38	39	40	41	42	43	44	45	46	47
Binary	100,000	100,001	100,010	100,011	100,100	100,101	100,110	100,111	101,000	101,001	101,010	101,011	101,100	101,101	101,110	101,111
Quaternary	200	201	202	203	210	211	212	213	220	221	222	223	230	231	232	233
Octal	40	41	42	43	44	45	46	47	50	51	52	53	54	55	56	57
Hexadecimal	20	21	22	23	24	25	26	27	28	29	2A	2B	2C	2D	2E	2F
Decimal	48	49	50	51	52	53	54	55	56	57	58	59	60	61	62	63
Binary	110,000	110,001	110,010	110,011	110,100	110,101	110,110	110,111	111,000	111,001	111,010	111,011	111,100	111,101	111,110	111,111
Quaternary	300	301	302	303	310	311	312	313	320	321	322	323	330	331	332	333
Octal	60	61	62	63	64	65	66	67	70	71	72	73	74	75	76	77
Hexadecimal	30	31	32	33	34	35	36	37	38	39	3A	3B	3C	3D	3E	3F
Decimal	64															
Binary	1,000,000															
Quaternary	1,000															
Octal	100															
Hexadecimal	40															

=== Relation to binary and hexadecimal ===
addition table
+	0	1	2	3
0	0	1	2	3
1	1	2	3	10
2	2	3	10	11
3	3	10	11	12

As with the octal and hexadecimal numeral systems, quaternary has a special relation to the binary numeral system. Each radix four, eight, and sixteen is a power of two, so the conversion to and from binary is implemented by matching each digit with two, three, or four binary digits, or bits. For example, in quaternary,

230210_{4} = 10 11 00 10 01 00_{2}.

Since sixteen is a power of four, conversion between these bases can be implemented by matching each hexadecimal digit with two quaternary digits. In the above example,

23 02 10_{4} = B24_{16}

multiplication table
×	0	1	2	3
0	0	0	0	0
1	0	1	2	3
2	0	2	10	12
3	0	3	12	21

Although octal and hexadecimal are widely used in computing and computer programming in the discussion and analysis of binary arithmetic and logic, quaternary does not enjoy the same status.

Although quaternary has limited practical use, it can be helpful if it is ever necessary to perform hexadecimal arithmetic without a calculator. Each hexadecimal digit can be turned into a pair of quaternary digits. Then, arithmetic can be performed relatively easily before converting the end result back to hexadecimal. Quaternary is convenient for this purpose, since numbers have only half the digit length compared to binary, while still having very simple multiplication and addition tables with only three unique non-trivial elements.

By analogy with byte and nybble, a quaternary digit is sometimes called a crumb.

== Fractions ==
Due to having only factors of two, many quaternary fractions have repeating digits, although these tend to be fairly simple:

Decimal base Prime factors of the base: 2, 5 Prime factors of one below the base: 3 Prime factors of one above the base: 11; Other prime factors: 7 13 17 19 23 29 31			Quaternary base Prime factors of the base: 2 Prime factors of one below the base: 3 Prime factors of one above the base: 5 (=11_{4}); Other prime factors: 13 23 31 101 103 113 131 133		
Fraction	Prime factors of the denominator	Positional representation	Positional representation	Prime factors of the denominator	Fraction
1/2	2	0.5	0.2	2	1/2
1/3	3	0.3333... = 0.3̅	0.1111... = 0.1̅	3	1/3
1/4	2	0.25	0.1	2	1/10
1/5	5	0.2	0.0̅3̅	11	1/11
1/6	2, 3	0.16̅	0.02̅	2, 3	1/12
1/7	7	0.1̅4̅2̅8̅5̅7̅	0.0̅2̅1̅	13	1/13
1/8	2	0.125	0.02	2	1/20
1/9	3	0.1̅	0.0̅1̅3̅	3	1/21
1/10	2, 5	0.1	0.01̅2̅	2, 11	1/22
1/11	11	0.0̅9̅	0.0̅1̅1̅3̅1̅	23	1/23
1/12	2, 3	0.083̅	0.01̅	2, 3	1/30
1/13	13	0.0̅7̅6̅9̅2̅3̅	0.0̅1̅0̅3̅2̅3̅	31	1/31
1/14	2, 7	0.07̅1̅4̅2̅8̅5̅	0.01̅0̅2̅	2, 13	1/32
1/15	3, 5	0.06̅	0.0̅1̅	3, 11	1/33
1/16	2	0.0625	0.01	2	1/100
1/17	17	0.0̅5̅8̅8̅2̅3̅5̅2̅9̅4̅1̅1̅7̅6̅4̅7̅	0.0̅0̅3̅3̅	101	1/101
1/18	2, 3	0.05̅	0.00̅3̅2̅	2, 3	1/102
1/19	19	0.0̅5̅2̅6̅3̅1̅5̅7̅8̅9̅4̅7̅3̅6̅8̅4̅2̅1̅	0.0̅0̅3̅1̅1̅3̅2̅1̅1̅	103	1/103
1/20	2, 5	0.05	0.00̅3̅	2, 11	1/110
1/21	3, 7	0.0̅4̅7̅6̅1̅9̅	0.0̅0̅3̅	3, 13	1/111
1/22	2, 11	0.04̅5̅	0.00̅2̅3̅2̅2̅	2, 23	1/112
1/23	23	0.0̅4̅3̅4̅7̅8̅2̅6̅0̅8̅6̅9̅5̅6̅5̅2̅1̅7̅3̅9̅1̅3̅	0.0̅0̅2̅3̅0̅2̅0̅1̅1̅2̅1̅	113	1/113
1/24	2, 3	0.0416̅	0.002̅	2, 3	1/120
1/25	5	0.04	0.0̅0̅2̅2̅0̅3̅3̅1̅1̅3̅	11	1/121
1/26	2, 13	0.03̅8̅4̅6̅1̅5̅	0.00̅2̅1̅3̅1̅2̅	2, 31	1/122
1/27	3	0.0̅3̅7̅	0.0̅0̅2̅1̅1̅3̅2̅3̅1̅	3	1/123
1/28	2, 7	0.035̅7̅1̅4̅2̅8̅	0.00̅2̅1̅	2, 13	1/130
1/29	29	0.0̅3̅4̅4̅8̅2̅7̅5̅8̅6̅2̅0̅6̅8̅9̅6̅5̅5̅1̅7̅2̅4̅1̅3̅7̅9̅3̅1̅	0.0̅0̅2̅0̅3̅1̅0̅3̅3̅1̅3̅0̅2̅3̅	131	1/131
1/30	2, 3, 5	0.03̅	0.00̅2̅	2, 3, 11	1/132
1/31	31	0.0̅3̅2̅2̅5̅8̅0̅6̅4̅5̅1̅6̅1̅2̅9̅	0.0̅0̅2̅0̅1̅	133	1/133
1/32	2	0.03125	0.002	2	1/200
1/33	3, 11	0.0̅3̅	0.0̅0̅1̅3̅3̅	3, 23	1/201
1/34	2, 17	0.02̅9̅4̅1̅1̅7̅6̅4̅7̅0̅5̅8̅8̅2̅3̅5̅	0.00̅1̅3̅2̅	2, 101	1/202
1/35	5, 7	0.02̅8̅5̅7̅1̅4̅	0.0̅0̅1̅3̅1̅1̅	11, 13	1/203
1/36	2, 3	0.027̅	0.00̅1̅3̅	2, 3	1/210

== Occurrence in human languages ==
Many or all of the Chumashan languages (spoken by the Native American Chumash peoples) originally used a quaternary numeral system, in which the names for numbers were structured according to multiples of four and sixteen, instead of ten. There is a surviving list of Ventureño language number words up to thirty-two written down by a Spanish priest ca. 1819.

The Kharosthi numerals (from the languages of the tribes of Pakistan and Afghanistan) have a partial quaternary numeral system from one to ten.

== Hilbert curves ==
Quaternary numbers are used in the representation of 2D Hilbert curves. Here, a real number between 0 and 1 is converted into the quaternary system. Every single digit now indicates in which of the respective four sub-quadrants the number will be projected.

== Genetics ==
Parallels can be drawn between quaternary numerals and the way genetic code is represented by DNA. The four DNA nucleotides in alphabetical order, abbreviated A, C, G, and T, can be taken to represent the quaternary digits in numerical order 0, 1, 2, and 3. With this encoding, the complementary digit pairs 0↔3, and 1↔2 (binary 00↔11 and 01↔10) match the complementation of the base pairs: A↔T and C↔G and can be stored as data in DNA sequence. For example, the nucleotide sequence GATTACA can be represented by the quaternary number 2033010 (= decimal 9156 or binary 10 00 11 11 00 01 00). The human genome is 3.2 billion base pairs in length.

== Data transmission ==
Quaternary line codes have been used for transmission, from the invention of the telegraph to the 2B1Q code used in modern ISDN circuits.

The GDDR6X standard, developed by Nvidia and Micron, uses quaternary bits to transmit data.

== Computing ==
Some computers have used quaternary floating point arithmetic including the Illinois ILLIAC II (1962) and the Digital Field System DFS IV and DFS V high-resolution site survey systems.

== See also ==
- Conversion between bases
- Moser–de Bruijn sequence, the numbers that have only 0 or 1 as their base-4 digits
