= Arithmetic dynamics =

Field of mathematics

Arithmetic dynamics is a field that amalgamates two areas of mathematics, dynamical systems and number theory. Part of the inspiration comes from complex dynamics, the study of the iteration of self-maps of the complex plane or other complex algebraic varieties. Arithmetic dynamics is the study of the number-theoretic properties of integer, rational, p-adic, or algebraic points under repeated application of a polynomial or rational function. A fundamental goal is to describe arithmetic properties in terms of underlying geometric structures.

Global arithmetic dynamics is the study of analogues of classical diophantine geometry in the setting of discrete dynamical systems, while local arithmetic dynamics, also called p-adic or nonarchimedean dynamics, is an analogue of complex dynamics in which one replaces the complex numbers C by a p-adic field such as Q_{p} or C_{p} and studies chaotic behavior and the Fatou and Julia sets.

The following table describes a rough correspondence between Diophantine equations, especially abelian varieties, and dynamical systems:

Diophantine equations	Dynamical systems
Rational and integer points on a variety	Rational and integer points in an orbit
Points of finite order on an abelian variety	Preperiodic points of a rational function

== Definitions and notation from discrete dynamics ==
Let S be a set and let F : S → S be a map from S to itself. The iterate of F with itself n times is denoted

$$F^{(n)} = F \circ F \circ \cdots \circ F.$$

A point P ∈ S is periodic if F^{(n)}(P) = P for some n ≥ 1.

The point is preperiodic if F^{(k)}(P) is periodic for some k ≥ 1.

The (forward) orbit of P is the set

$$O_F(P) = \left \{ P, F(P), F^{(2)}(P), F^{(3)}(P), \cdots\right\}.$$

Thus P is preperiodic if and only if its orbit O_{F}(P) is finite.

== Number theoretic properties of preperiodic points ==
Let F(x) be a rational function of degree at least two with coefficients in Q. A theorem of Douglas Northcott says that F has only finitely many Q-rational preperiodic points, i.e., F has only finitely many preperiodic points in P^{1}(Q). The uniform boundedness conjecture for preperiodic points of Patrick Morton and Joseph Silverman says that the number of preperiodic points of F in P^{1}(Q) is bounded by a constant that depends only on the degree of F.

More generally, let F : P^{N} → P^{N} be a morphism of degree at least two defined over a number field K. Northcott's theorem says that F has only finitely many preperiodic points in P^{N}(K), and the general Uniform Boundedness Conjecture says that the number of preperiodic points in P^{N}(K) may be bounded solely in terms of N, the degree of F, and the degree of K over Q.

The Uniform Boundedness Conjecture is not known even for quadratic polynomials F_{c}(x) = x^{2} + c over the rational numbers Q. It is known in this case that F_{c}(x) cannot have periodic points of period four, five, or six, although the result for period six is contingent on the validity of the conjecture of Birch and Swinnerton-Dyer. Bjorn Poonen has conjectured that F_{c}(x) cannot have rational periodic points of any period strictly larger than three.

== Integer points in orbits ==
The orbit of a rational map may contain infinitely many integers. For example, if F(x) is a polynomial with integer coefficients and if a is an integer, then it is clear that the entire orbit O_{F}(a) consists of integers. Similarly, if F(x) is a rational map and some iterate F^{(n)}(x) is a polynomial with integer coefficients, then every n-th entry in the orbit is an integer. An example of this phenomenon is the map F(x) = x^{−d}, whose second iterate is a polynomial. It turns out that this is the only way that an orbit can contain infinitely many integers.

Theorem. Let F(x) ∈ Q(x) be a rational function of degree at least two, and assume that no iterate of F is a polynomial. Let a ∈ Q. Then the orbit O_{F}(a) contains only finitely many integers.

== Dynamically defined points lying on subvarieties ==
There are general conjectures due to Shouwu Zhang and others concerning subvarieties that contain infinitely many periodic points or that intersect an orbit in infinitely many points. These are dynamical analogues of, respectively, the Manin–Mumford conjecture, proven by Michel Raynaud, and the Mordell–Lang conjecture, proven by Gerd Faltings. The following conjectures illustrate the general theory in the case that the subvariety is a curve.

Conjecture. Let F : P^{N} → P^{N} be a morphism and let C ⊂ P^{N} be an irreducible algebraic curve. Suppose that there is a point P ∈ P^{N} such that C contains infinitely many points in the orbit O_{F}(P). Then C is periodic for F in the sense that there is some iterate F^{(k)} of F that maps C to itself.

== p-adic dynamics ==
The field of p-adic (or nonarchimedean) dynamics is the study of classical dynamical questions over a field K that is complete with respect to a nonarchimedean absolute value. Examples of such fields are the field of p-adic rationals Q_{p} and the completion of its algebraic closure C_{p}. The metric on K and the standard definition of equicontinuity leads to the usual definition of the Fatou and Julia sets of a rational map F(x) ∈ K(x). There are many similarities between the complex and the nonarchimedean theories, but also many differences. A striking difference is that in the nonarchimedean setting, the Fatou set is always nonempty, but the Julia set may be empty. This is the reverse of what is true over the complex numbers. Nonarchimedean dynamics has been extended to Berkovich space, which is a compact connected space that contains the totally disconnected non-locally compact field C_{p}.

== Generalizations ==
There are natural generalizations of arithmetic dynamics in which Q and Q_{p} are replaced by number fields and their p-adic completions. Another natural generalization is to replace self-maps of P^{1} or P^{N} with self-maps (morphisms) V → V of other affine or projective varieties.

== Other areas in which number theory and dynamics interact ==
There are many other problems of a number theoretic nature that appear in the setting of dynamical systems, including:

- dynamics over finite fields.
- dynamics over function fields such as C(x).
- iteration of formal and p-adic power series.
- dynamics on Lie groups.
- arithmetic properties of dynamically defined moduli spaces.
- equidistribution and invariant measures, especially on p-adic spaces.
- dynamics on Drinfeld modules.
- number-theoretic iteration problems that are not described by rational maps on varieties, for example, the Collatz problem.
- symbolic codings of dynamical systems based on explicit arithmetic expansions of real numbers.

The Arithmetic Dynamics Reference List gives an extensive list of articles and books covering a wide range of arithmetical dynamical topics.

== See also ==
- Arithmetic geometry
- Arithmetic topology
- Combinatorics and dynamical systems
- Arboreal Galois representation
