= Periodic point =

Point which a function/system returns to after some time or iterations

In mathematics, in the study of iterated functions and dynamical systems, a periodic point of a function is a point which the system returns to after a certain number of function iterations or a certain amount of time.

== Iterated functions ==
Given a mapping f from a set X into itself,

$$f: X \to X,$$

a point x in X is called periodic point if there exists an n>0 so that

$$\ f_n(x) = x$$

where f_{n} is the nth iterate of f. The smallest positive integer n satisfying the above is called the prime period or least period of the point x. If every point in X is a periodic point with the same period n, then f is called periodic with period n (this is not to be confused with the notion of a periodic function).

If there exist distinct n and m such that

$$f_n(x) = f_m(x)$$

then x is called a preperiodic point. All periodic points are preperiodic.

If f is a diffeomorphism of a differentiable manifold, so that the derivative $f_n^\prime$ is defined, then one says that a periodic point is hyperbolic if

$$|f_n^\prime|\ne 1,$$

that it is attractive if

$$|f_n^\prime|< 1,$$

and it is repelling if

$$|f_n^\prime|> 1.$$

If the dimension of the stable manifold of a periodic point or fixed point is zero, the point is called a source; if the dimension of its unstable manifold is zero, it is called a sink; and if both the stable and unstable manifold have nonzero dimension, it is called a saddle or saddle point.

=== Examples ===
A period-one point is called a fixed point.

The logistic map

$x_{t+1}=rx_t(1-x_t), \qquad 0 \leq x_t \leq 1, \qquad 0 \leq r \leq 4$

exhibits periodicity for various values of the parameter r. For r between 0 and 1, 0 is the sole periodic point, with period 1 (giving the sequence 0, 0, 0, …, which attracts all orbits). For r between 1 and 3, the value 0 is still periodic but is not attracting, while the value $\tfrac{r-1}{r}$ is an attracting periodic point of period 1. With r greater than 3 but less than $1 + \sqrt 6,$ there are a pair of period-2 points which together form an attracting sequence, as well as the non-attracting period-1 points 0 and $\tfrac{r-1}{r}.$ As the value of parameter r rises toward 4, there arise groups of periodic points with any positive integer for the period; for some values of r one of these repeating sequences is attracting while for others none of them are (with almost all orbits being chaotic).

== Dynamical system ==
Given a real global dynamical system $(\R, X, \Phi),$ with X the phase space and Φ the evolution function,

$$\Phi: \R \times X \to X$$

a point x in X is called periodic with period T if

$$\Phi(T, x) = x\,$$

The smallest positive T with this property is called prime period of the point x.

=== Properties ===
- Given a periodic point x with period T, then $\Phi(t,x) = \Phi(t+T,x)$ for all t in $\R.$
- Given a periodic point x then all points on the orbit γ_{x} through x are periodic with the same prime period.

== See also ==
- Limit cycle
- Limit set
- Stable set
- Sharkovsky's theorem
- Stationary point
- Periodic points of complex quadratic mappings
