= Centered polyhedral number =

Type of figurate number

In mathematics, the centered polyhedral numbers are a class of figurate numbers, each formed by a central dot, surrounded by polyhedral layers with a constant number of edges. The length of the edges increases by one in each additional layer.

== Examples ==
- Centered tetrahedral numbers
- Centered cube numbers
- Centered octahedral numbers
- Centered dodecahedral numbers
- Centered icosahedral numbers
- Stella octangula numbers
