= Centered nonagonal number =

Centered figurate number that represents a nonagon with a dot in the center

A centered nonagonal number, (or centered enneagonal number), is a centered figurate number that represents a nonagon with a dot in the center and all other dots surrounding the center dot in successive nonagonal layers. The centered nonagonal number for n layers is given by the formula

$$Nc(n) = \frac{(3n-2)(3n-1)}{2}.$$

Proof without words that nonagonal numbers are triangular

Multiplying the (n − 1)th triangular number by 9 and then adding 1 yields the nth centered nonagonal number, but centered nonagonal numbers have an even simpler relation to triangular numbers: every third triangular number (the 1st, 4th, 7th, etc.) is also a centered nonagonal number.

Thus, the first few centered nonagonal numbers are

1, 10, 28, 55, 91, 136, 190, 253, 325, 406, 496, 595, 703, 820, 946.

The list above includes the perfect numbers 28 and 496. All even perfect numbers are triangular numbers whose index is an odd Mersenne prime. Since every Mersenne prime greater than 3 is congruent to 1 modulo 3, it follows that every even perfect number greater than 6 is a centered nonagonal number.

In 1850, Sir Frederick Pollock conjectured that every natural number is the sum of at most eleven centered nonagonal numbers. Pollock's conjecture was confirmed as true in 2023.

== Congruence Relations ==
- All centered nonagonal numbers are congruent to 1 mod 3.
  - Therefore the sum of any 3 centered nonagonal numbers and the difference of any two centered nonagonal numbers are divisible by 3.

== See also ==
- Nonagonal number
