= Gnomon =

Part of a sundial that casts a shadow

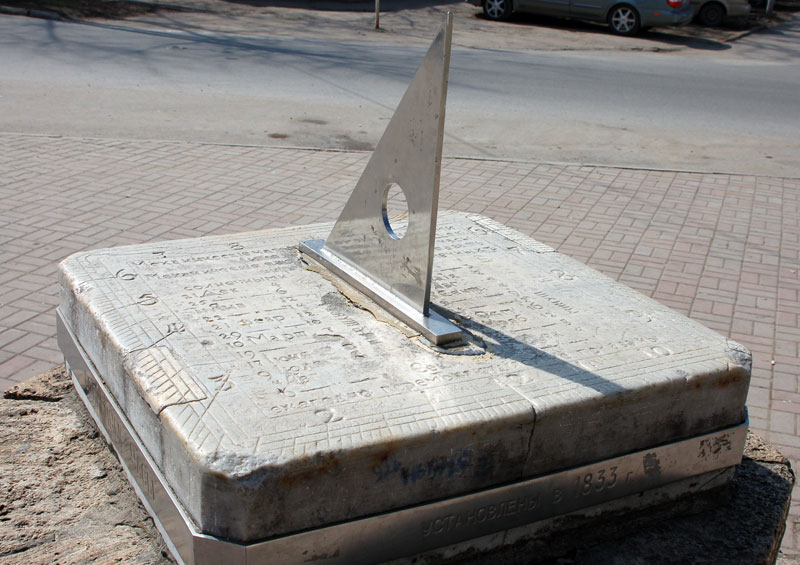
The gnomon is the triangular blade in this sundial.

A gnomon (/ˈnoʊˌmɒn, -mən/; from Ancient Greek γνώμων (gnṓmōn) 'one that knows or examines'), or stylus, is the stationary part of a sundial that casts a shadow. The term is used for a variety of purposes in mathematics and other fields, typically to measure directions, position, or time.

== History ==
A gnomon as in Euclid book II

Invariant snail in the subtraction of gnomons (Hero's definition)

A painted stick dating from 2300 BC that was excavated at the archeological site of Taosi is the oldest gnomon known in China. The gnomon was widely used in ancient China from the second millennium BC onward in order to determine the changes in seasons, orientation, and geographical latitude. The ancient Chinese used shadow measurements for creating calendars that are mentioned in several ancient texts.

According to the collection of Zhou Chinese poetic anthologies Classic of Poetry, one of the distant ancestors of King Wen of the Zhou dynasty used to measure gnomon shadow lengths to determine the orientation around the 14th century BC. The ancient Greek philosopher Anaximander (610–546 BC) is credited with introducing this Babylonian instrument to the Ancient Greeks.

The ancient Greek mathematician and astronomer Oenopides used the phrase drawn gnomon-wise to describe a line drawn perpendicular to another. Later, the term was used for an L-shaped instrument like a steel square used to draw right angles. This shape may explain its use to describe a shape formed by cutting a smaller square from a larger one. Euclid extended the term to the plane figure formed by removing a similar parallelogram from a corner of a larger parallelogram. Indeed, the gnomon is the increment between two successive figurate numbers, including square and triangular numbers.

=== Definition of Hero of Alexandria ===
The ancient Greek mathematician and engineer Hero of Alexandria defined a gnomon as that which, when added or subtracted to an entity (number or shape), makes a new entity similar to the starting entity. In this sense Theon of Smyrna used it to describe a number which added to a polygonal number produces the next one of the same type. The most common use in this sense is an odd integer especially when seen as a figurate number between square numbers.

=== Vitruvius ===
Vitruvius mentions the gnomon as "gnonomice" in the first sentence of chapter 3 in volume 1 of his book De Architectura. That Latin term "gnonomice" leaves room for interpretation. Despite its similarity to "γνωμονικός" (or its feminine form "γνωμονική"), it appears unlikely that Vitruvius refers to judgement on the one hand or to the design of sundials on the other. It appears to be more appropriate to assume that he refers to geometry, a science upon which gnomons rely heavily. In those days, calculations were carried out geometrically, in contrast to the algebraic methods in use today. Thus, it seems that he indirectly refers to mathematics and geodesy.

== Pinhole gnomons ==
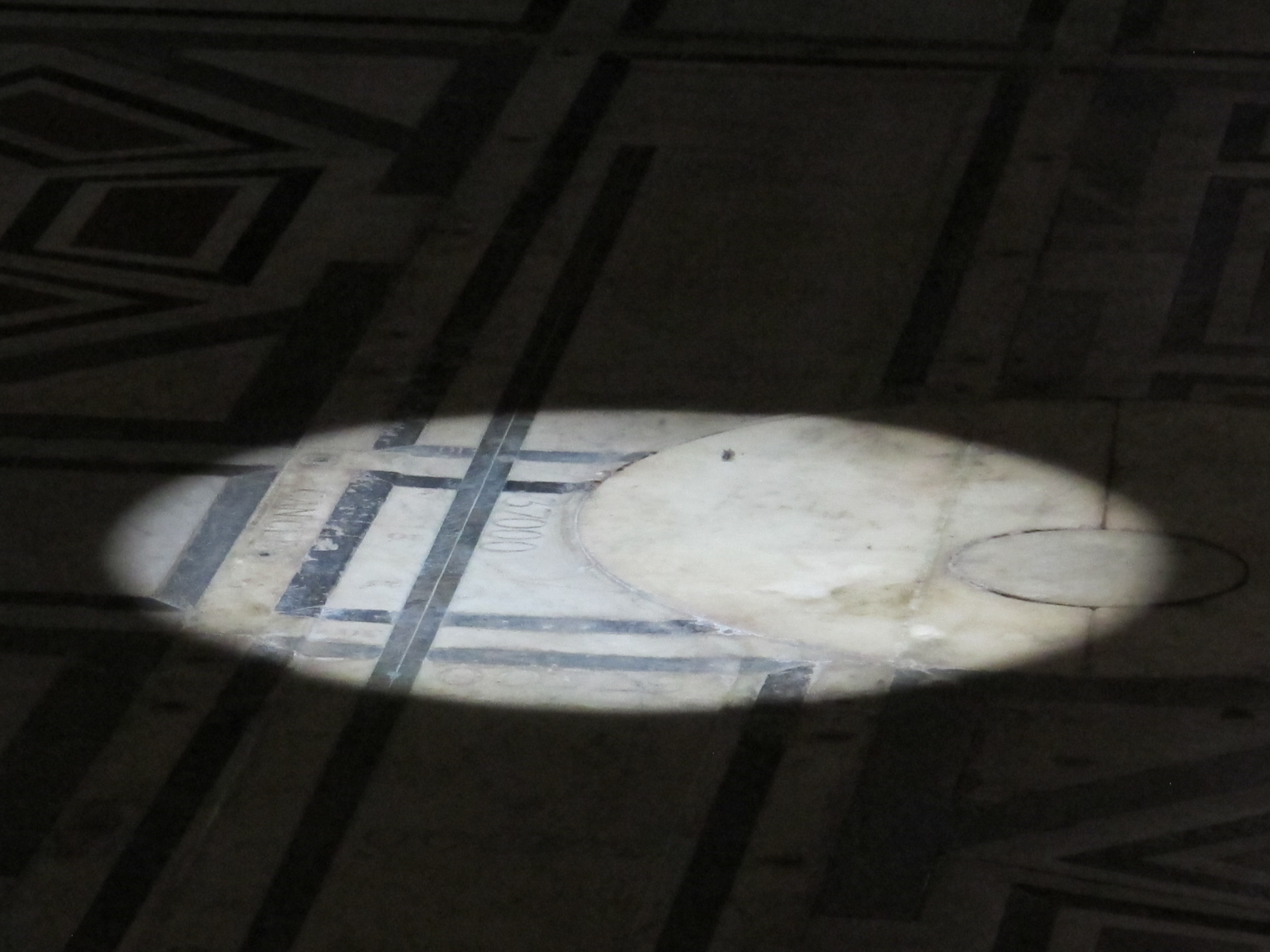
The gnomon projection on the floor of the Santa Maria del Fiore Cathedral during the solstice on 21 June 2012

Perforated gnomons projecting a pinhole image of the Sun, which results in a larger image due to the camera obscura effect. Projecting a larger image of the sun onto a flat surface makes astronomical observations more practical and thus of value to astronomers.

The earliest recorded use of pinhole gnomons comes from the Chinese Zhoubi Suanjing, possibly dating as early as the early Zhou (11th century BC). However, the oldest known surviving forms found in the middle east date to the Eastern Han (3rd century).

In the Middle East and Europe, it was separately credited to the Egyptian astronomer and mathematician Ibn Yunus around AD 1000. The Italian astronomer, mathematician and cosmographer Paolo Toscanelli is associated with the 1475 placement of a bronze plate with a round hole in the dome of the Cathedral of Santa Maria del Fiore in Florence to project an image of the Sun on the cathedral's floor. With markings on the floor it tells the exact time of each midday (reportedly to within half a second) as well as the date of the summer solstice. Italian mathematician, engineer, astronomer and geographer Leonardo Ximenes reconstructed the gnomon according to his new measurements in 1756.

== Orientation ==
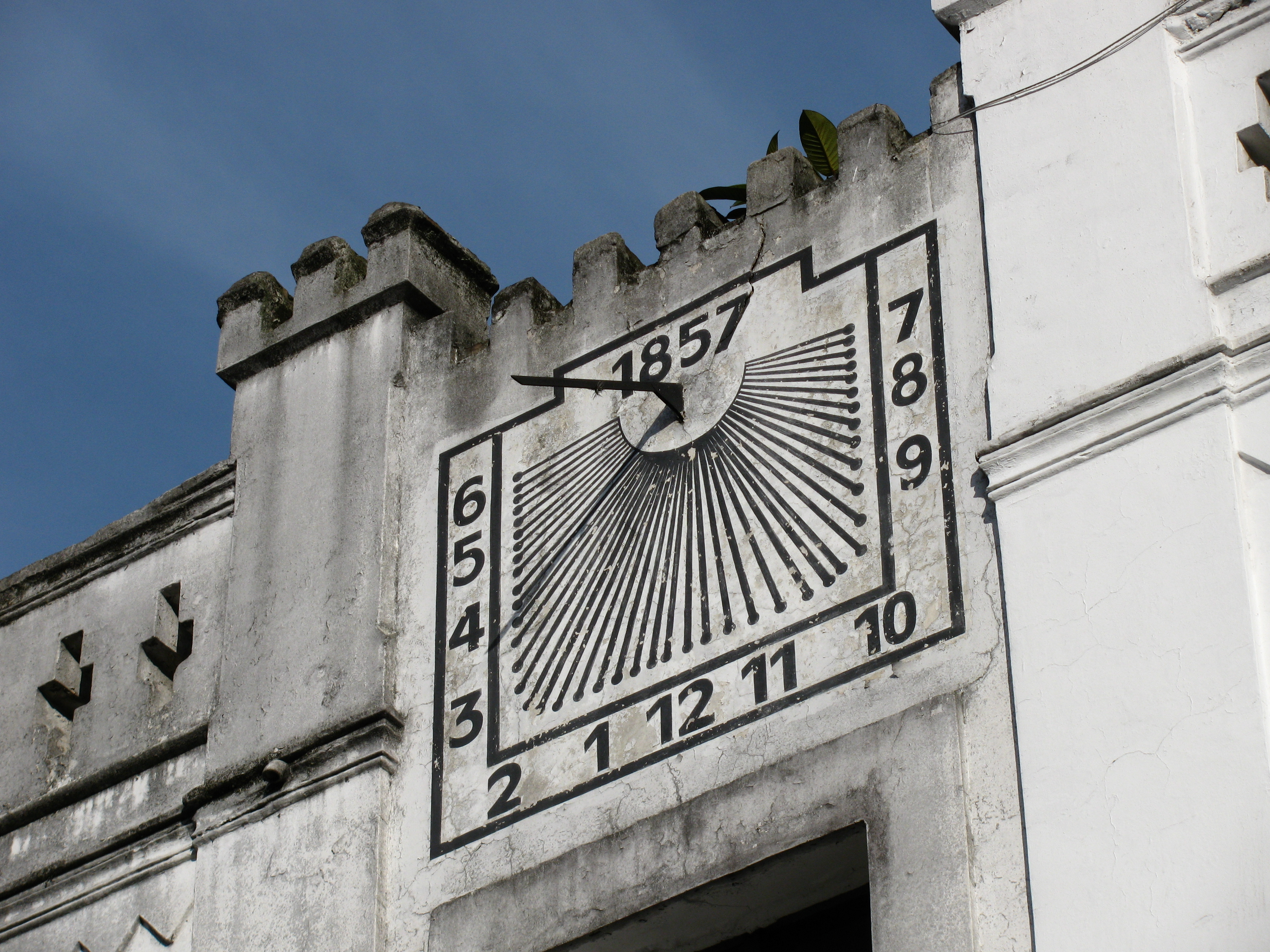
Gnomon situated on the wall of a building facing Tiradentes Square, Curitiba, Brazil

In the Northern Hemisphere, the shadow-casting edge of a sundial gnomon is normally oriented so that it points due northward and is parallel to the rotational axis of Earth. That is, it is inclined to the northern horizon at an angle that equals the latitude of the sundial's location. At present, such a gnomon should thus point almost precisely at Polaris, as this is within 1° of the north celestial pole.

On some sundials, the gnomon is vertical. These were usually used in former times for observing the altitude of the Sun, especially when on the meridian.

=== Style ===
The style is the part of the gnomon that casts the shadow. This can change as the Sun moves. For example, the upper west edge of the gnomon might be the style in the morning and the upper east edge might be the style in the afternoon.

== Modern uses ==
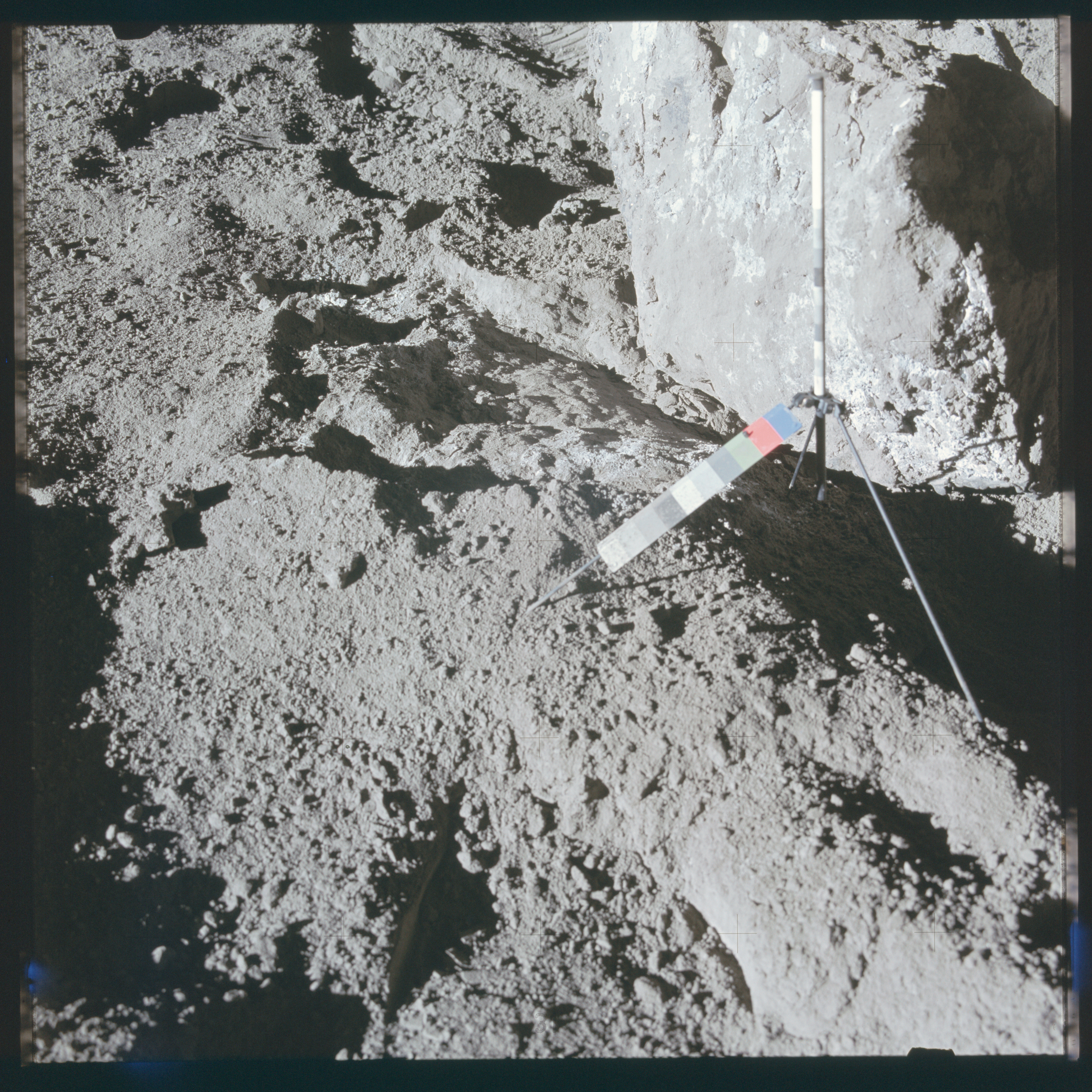
Gnomon in use on the moon during Apollo 15

Gnomons have been used in space missions to the Moon and Mars. The gnomon used by the Apollo astronauts was a gimballed stadia rod mounted on a tripod. While the rod's shadow indicated the direction of the Sun, the grayscale paints of varying reflectivity and the red, green and blue patches facilitated proper photography on the surface on the Moon. MarsDials have been used on Mars Exploration Rovers.

== In computer graphics ==
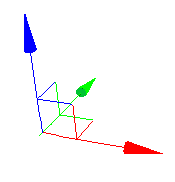
A gnomon in computer graphics

A three-dimensional gnomon is commonly used in CAD and computer graphics as an aid to positioning objects in the virtual world. By convention, the x-axis direction is colored red, the y-axis green and the z-axis blue.

== In popular culture ==
The Gnomon of Saint-Sulpice inside the Parisian church, Église Saint-Sulpice, built to assist in determining the date of Easter, was fictionalized as a "Rose Line" in the novel The Da Vinci Code.

== Literary uses ==
In modern literary and theoretical thought, the gnomon has been reappropriated as an epistemological and aesthetic figure, extending beyond its classical astronomical or geometrical uses. Within the contexts of modernism and postmodernism, the gnomon appears in the work of authors and thinkers such as James Joyce, Paul Valéry, Julia Kristeva, Fernand Deligny, and Michel Deguy, where it functions as a mediation between the sensible and the conceptual. Drawing on the literary work of French novelist Nathalie Sarraute, the feminist writer Monique Wittig proposed the concept of the “modern gnomon” to describe the relationship between knowledge and poetic invention.
