= Tetrahedral number =

Polyhedral number representing a tetrahedron

A pyramid with side length 5 contains 35 spheres. Each layer represents one of the first five triangular numbers.

A tetrahedral number, or triangular pyramidal number, is a figurate number that represents a pyramid with a triangular base and three sides, called a tetrahedron. The nth tetrahedral number, Te_{n}, is the sum of the first n triangular numbers, that is,

$$Te_n = \sum_{k=1}^n T_k = \sum_{k=1}^n \frac{k(k+1)}{2} = \sum_{k=1}^n \left(\sum_{i=1}^k i\right)$$

The tetrahedral numbers are:

1, 4, 10, 20, 35, 56, 84, 120, 165, 220, ... (sequence A000292 in the OEIS)

== Formula ==
Derivation of Tetrahedral number from a left-justified Pascal's triangle. Natural numbers Triangular numbers Tetrahedral numbers Pentatope numbers 5-simplex numbers 6-simplex numbers 7-simplex numbers

The formula for the nth tetrahedral number is represented by the 3rd rising factorial of n divided by the factorial of 3:

$$Te_n= \sum_{k=1}^n T_k = \sum_{k=1}^n \frac{k(k+1)}{2} = \sum_{k=1}^n \left(\sum_{i=1}^k i\right)=\frac{n(n+1)(n+2)}{6} = \frac{n^{\overline 3}}{3!}$$

The tetrahedral numbers can also be represented as binomial coefficients:

$$Te_n=\binom{n+2}{3}.$$

Tetrahedral numbers can therefore be found in the fourth position either from left or right in Pascal's triangle.

=== Proofs of formula ===
Six copies of a triangular pyramid with n steps can fit in a cuboid of size n(n + 1)(n + 2)

This proof uses the fact that the nth triangular number is given by

$$T_n=\frac{n(n+1)}{2}.$$

It proceeds by induction.

Base case
$$Te_1 = 1 = \frac{1\cdot 2\cdot 3}{6}.$$

Inductive step
$$\begin{align}
Te_{n+1} \quad
&= Te_n + T_{n+1} \\
&= \frac{n(n+1)(n+2)}{6} + \frac{(n+1)(n+2)}{2}  \\
&= (n+1)(n+2)\left(\frac{n}{6}+\frac{1}{2}\right) \\
&= \frac{(n+1)(n+2)(n+3)}{6}.
\end{align}$$

The formula can also be proved by Gosper's algorithm.

=== Recursive relation ===
Tetrahedral and triangular numbers are related through the recursive formulas

$$\begin{align}
& Te_n = Te_{n-1} + T_n &(1)\\
& T_n = T_{n-1} + n &(2)
\end{align}$$

The equation $(1)$ becomes

$$\begin{align}
& Te_n = Te_{n-1} + T_{n-1} + n
\end{align}$$

Substituting $n-1$ for $n$ in equation $(1)$

$$\begin{align}
& Te_{n-1} = Te_{n-2} + T_{n-1}
\end{align}$$

Thus, the $n$th tetrahedral number satisfies the following recursive equation

$$\begin{align}
& Te_{n} = 2Te_{n-1} - Te_{n-2} + n
\end{align}$$

== Generalization ==
The pattern found for triangular numbers $\sum_{n_1=1}^{n_2}n_1=\binom{n_2+1}{2}$ and for tetrahedral numbers $\sum_{n_2=1}^{n_3}\sum_{n_1=1}^{n_2}n_1=\binom{n_3+2}{3}$ can be generalized. This leads to the formula:
$$\sum_{n_{k-1}=1}^{n_k}\sum_{n_{k-2}=1}^{n_{k-1}}\ldots\sum_{n_2=1}^{n_3}\sum_{n_1=1}^{n_2}n_1=\binom{n_k+k-1}{k} = \frac{n_k^{\overline k}}{k!}$$

== Primality ==
Due to the factorization $n(n+1)(n+2)$, it is impossible for a tetrahedral number to be a prime number. The only case where 4 of the factors are 1 is at n=2 $2*3*4/6=1*1*4$ but 4 is a composite number $(2*2)$. So a tetrahedral number cannot be prime.

== Geometric interpretation ==
Tetrahedral numbers can be modelled by stacking spheres. For example, the fifth tetrahedral number (Te_{5} = 35) can be modelled with 35 billiard balls and the standard triangular billiards ball frame that holds 15 balls in place. Then 10 more balls are stacked on top of those, then another 6, then another three and one ball at the top completes the tetrahedron.

When order-n tetrahedra built from Te_{n} spheres are used as a unit, it can be shown that a space tiling with such units can achieve a densest sphere packing as long as n ≤ 4.

== Tetrahedral roots and tests for tetrahedral numbers ==
By analogy with the cube root of x, one can define the (real) tetrahedral root of x as the number n such that Te_{n} = x:
$$n = \sqrt[3]{3x+\sqrt{9{x^2}-\frac{1}{27}}} +\sqrt[3]{3x-\sqrt{9{x^2}-\frac{1}{27}}} -1$$

which follows from Cardano's formula. Equivalently, if the real tetrahedral root n of x is an integer, x is the nth tetrahedral number.

== Properties ==
- Te_{n} + Te_{n−1} = 1^{2} + 2^{2} + 3^{2} ... + n^{2}, the square pyramidal numbers.
  Te_{2n+1} = 1^{2} + 3^{2} ... + (2n+1)^{2}, sum of odd squares.
  Te_{2n} = 2^{2} + 4^{2} ... + (2n)^{2} , sum of even squares.
- A. J. Meyl proved in 1878 that only three tetrahedral numbers are also perfect squares, namely:
  Te_{1} = 1^{2} = 1
  Te_{2} = 2^{2} = 4
  Te_{48} = 140^{2} = 19600.
- Like square numbers are congruent to 0, 1, or 4 (mod 8), similarly tetrahedral numbers are congruent to 0, 1, or 4 (mod 5)
- Sir Frederick Pollock conjectured that every positive integer is the sum of at most 5 tetrahedral numbers: see Pollock tetrahedral numbers conjecture.
- The only tetrahedral number that is also a square pyramidal number is 1 (Beukers, 1988), and the only tetrahedral number that is also a perfect cube is 1.
- The infinite sum of tetrahedral numbers' reciprocals is 3/2, which can be derived using telescoping series:
  $$\sum_{n=1}^{\infty} \frac{6}{n(n+1)(n+2)} = \frac{3}{2}.$$
- The parity of tetrahedral numbers follows the repeating pattern odd-even-even-even.
- An observation of tetrahedral numbers:
  Te_{5} = Te_{4} + Te_{3} + Te_{2} + Te_{1}
- Numbers that are both triangular and tetrahedral must satisfy the binomial coefficient equation:
  $$T_n=\binom{n+1}{2}=\binom{m+2}{3}=Te_m.$$

The third tetrahedral number equals the fourth triangular number as the nth k-simplex number equals the kth n-simplex number due to the symmetry of Pascal's triangle, and its diagonals being simplex numbers; similarly, the fifth tetrahedral number (35) equals the fourth pentatope number, and so forth

The only numbers that are both tetrahedral and triangular numbers are (sequence A027568 in the OEIS):

Te_{1} = T_{1} = 1
Te_{3} = T_{4} = 10
Te_{8} = T_{15} = 120
Te_{20} = T_{55} = 1540
Te_{34} = T_{119} = 7140

- Te_{n} is the sum of all products p × q where (p, q) are ordered pairs and p + q = n + 1
- Te_{n} is the number of (n + 2)-bit numbers that contain two runs of 1's in their binary expansion.
- The largest tetrahedral number of the form $2^a+3^b+1$ for some integers $a$ and $b$ is 8436.

== Popular culture ==
Number of gifts of each type and number received each day and their relationship to figurate numbers

Te_{12} = 364 is the total number of gifts "my true love sent to me" during the course of all 12 verses of the carol, "The Twelve Days of Christmas". The cumulative total number of gifts after each verse is also Te_{n} for verse n.

The number of possible KeyForge three-house combinations is also a tetrahedral number, Te_{n−2} where n is the number of houses.

== See also ==
- Centered triangular number
- Simplex number
