= Factoriangular number =

Sum of a factorial number and a triangular number

In number theory, a factoriangular number is an integer formed by adding a factorial and a triangular number with the same index.

== Definition ==
For $n \ge 1$, the $n$th factoriangular number, denoted $\operatorname{Ft}_n$, is defined as the sum of the $n$th factorial and the $n$th triangular number:

$$\operatorname{Ft}_n = n! + T_n = n! + \frac{n(n+1)}{2}$$.

The first few factoriangular numbers are:

$n$	$n!$	$T_n$	$\operatorname{Ft}_n = n! + T_n$
1	1	1	2
2	2	3	5
3	6	6	12
4	24	10	34
5	120	15	135
6	720	21	741
7	5,040	28	5,068
8	40,320	36	40,356
9	362,880	45	362,925
10	3,628,800	55	3,628,855

These numbers form the integer sequence A101292 in the Online Encyclopedia of Integer Sequences (OEIS).

== Properties ==
=== Recurrence relations ===
Factoriangular numbers satisfy several recurrence relations. For $n \geq 1$,

$$\operatorname{Ft}_{n+1} = (n+1)\left(\operatorname{Ft}_n - \frac{n^2-2}{2}\right)$$

And for $n \geq 2$,

$$\operatorname{Ft}_n = n\left(\operatorname{Ft}_{n-1} - \frac{n^2-2n-1}{2}\right)$$

These are linear non-homogeneous recurrence relations with variable coefficients of order 1.

=== Generating functions ===
The exponential generating function $E(x) = \sum_{n=0}^\infty \operatorname{Ft}_n \tfrac{x^n}{n!}$ for factoriangular numbers is (for $-1 < x < 1$)

$$E(x) =  \frac{2 + (2-5x^2+2x^3+x^4)e^x}{2(1-x)^2}$$

If the sequence is extended to include $\operatorname{Ft}_0 = 1$, then the exponential generating function becomes

$$E(x) = \frac{2 + (2x-x^2-x^3)e^x}{2(1-x)}$$.

=== Representations as sums of triangular numbers ===
Factoriangular numbers can sometimes be expressed as sums of two triangular numbers:

- $\operatorname{Ft}_n = 2T_n$ if and only if $n = 1$ or $n = 3$.
- $\operatorname{Ft}_n = T_x + T_n$ if and only if $8n! + 1$ is a perfect square. For $n \neq x$, the only known solution is $(\operatorname{Ft}_5, T_{15}) = (135, 120)$, giving $\operatorname{Ft}_5 = T_5 + T_{15}$.
- $\operatorname{Ft}_n = T_x + T_y$ if and only if $8\operatorname{Ft}_n + 2$ is a sum of two squares.

=== Representations as sums of squares ===
Some factoriangular numbers can be expressed as the sum of two squares. For $n \leq 20$, the factoriangular numbers that can be written as $a^2 + b^2$ for some integers $a$ and $b$ include:

- $\operatorname{Ft}_1 = 2 = 1^2 + 1^2$
- $\operatorname{Ft}_2 = 5 = 1^2 + 2^2$
- $\operatorname{Ft}_4 = 34 = 3^2 + 5^2$
- $\operatorname{Ft}_9 = 362,925 = 195^2 + 570^2$

This result is related to the sum of two squares theorem, which states that a positive integer can be expressed as a sum of two squares if and only if its prime factorization contains no prime factor of the form $4k+3$ raised to an odd power.

=== Fibonacci factoriangular numbers ===
A Fibonacci factoriangular number is a number that is both a Fibonacci number and a factoriangular number. There are exactly three such numbers:

- $\operatorname{Ft}_1 = 2 = F_3$
- $\operatorname{Ft}_2 = 5 = F_5$
- $\operatorname{Ft}_4 = 34 = F_9$

This result was conjectured by Romer Castillo and later proved by Ruiz and Luca.

=== Pell factoriangular numbers ===
A Pell factoriangular number is a number that is both a Pell number and a factoriangular number. Luca and Gómez-Ruiz proved that there are exactly three such numbers: $\operatorname{Ft}_1 = 2$, $\operatorname{Ft}_2 = 5$, and $\operatorname{Ft}_3 = 12$.

=== Catalan factoriangular numbers ===
A Catalan factoriangular number is a number that is both a Catalan number and a factoriangular number. The only such numbers are 1, 2 and 5. They also proved in the same paper that the only central binomial coefficients which are also factoriangular numbers are 1 and 2.

== Generalizations ==
The concept of factoriangular numbers can be generalized to $(n,k)$-factoriangular numbers, defined as $\operatorname{Ft}_{n,k} = n! + T_k$ where $n$ and $k$ are positive integers. The original factoriangular numbers correspond to the case where $n = k$. This generalization gives rise to factoriangular triangles, which are Pascal-like triangular arrays of numbers. Two such triangles can be formed:

- A triangle with entries $\operatorname{Ft}_{n,k}$ where $k \leq n$, yielding the sequence: 2, 3, 5, 7, 9, 12, 25, 27, 30, 34, ...
- A triangle with entries $\operatorname{Ft}_{n,k}$ where $k \geq n$, yielding the sequence: 2, 4, 5, 7, 8, 12, 11, 12, 16, 34, ...

In both cases, the diagonal entries (where $n = k$) correspond to the original factoriangular numbers.

== See also ==
- Doubly triangular number
- Factorial prime
- Fibonacci number
- Lazy caterer's sequence
- Square triangular number
