= Dodecagonal number =

Figurate number representing a dodecagon

In mathematics, a dodecagonal number is a figurate number that represents a dodecagon. The dodecagonal number for n is given by the formula

$$D_{n}=5n^2 - 4n$$

The first few dodecagonal numbers are:

0, 1, 12, 33, 64, 105, 156, 217, 288, 369, 460, 561, 672, 793, 924, 1065, 1216, 1377, 1548, 1729, ... (sequence A051624 in the OEIS)

== Properties ==
- The dodecagonal number for n can be calculated by adding the square of n to four times the (n - 1)th pronic number, or to put it algebraically, $D_n = n^2 + 4(n^2 - n)$.
- Dodecagonal numbers consistently alternate parity, and in base 10, their units place digits follow the pattern 1, 2, 3, 4, 5, 6, 7, 8, 9, 0.
- By the Fermat polygonal number theorem, every number is the sum of at most 12 dodecagonal numbers.
- $D_n$ is the sum of the first n natural numbers congruent to 1 mod 10.
- $D_{n+1}$ is the sum of all odd numbers from 4n+1 to 6n+1.

== Sum of reciprocals ==
A formula for the sum of the reciprocals of the dodecagonal numbers is given by
$$\sum_{n=1}^{\infty}\frac{1}{5n^{2}-4n}=\frac{5}{16}\ln\left(5\right)+\frac{\sqrt{5}}{8}\ln\left(\frac{1+\sqrt{5}}{2}\right)+\frac{\pi}{8}\sqrt{1+\frac{2}{\sqrt{5}}}.$$

== See also ==
- Polygonal number
- Figurate number
- Dodecagon
