= 365 =

365 may refer to:

- 365 (number), an integer
- a common year, consisting of 365 calendar days
- AD 365, a year of the Julian calendar
- 365 BC, a year of the 4th century BC

== Media outlets ==
- 365 (media corporation), Icelandic TV company
- 365 Media Group, UK sports betting company

== Music ==
- 365 (album), a 2012 album by Taiwanese Mandopop trio boyband JPM
- "365" (Zedd and Katy Perry song), 2019
- "365" (Loona song), 2019
- "365", by Amaranthe, 2018
- "365", by Aṣa from Lucid, 2019
- 365 (Charli XCX song), 2024
- "365", by Itzy from Checkmate, 2022
- "365", by Nicole C. Mullen from Christmas in Black and White, 2002
- "365", by Tiara Andini from Tiara Andini, 2021
- "3.6.5", by Exo from XOXO, 2013
- K.365, Concerto for 2 pianos & orchestra in E flat major ("Concerto No. 10"), K. 365 (K. 316a) by Wolfgang Amadeus Mozart
- "365", a song by DJ Khaled featuring Kent Jones, Ace Hood and Vado, made for the soundtrack of NBA 2K16

== Software ==
- Microsoft 365, a line of subscription services for office software
- Microsoft Dynamics 365, a product line of enterprise resource planning and customer relationship management
- Windows 365, a cross-platform usage subscriptions to virtualized Windows desktops

== Other uses ==
- Ferrari 365, a grand tourer produced by Ferrari

== See also ==
- 365th (disambiguation)
- 365 days (disambiguation)
