= Decagonal number =

Figurate number representing a decagon

In mathematics, a decagonal number is a figurate number that extends the concept of triangular and square numbers to the decagon (a ten-sided polygon). However, unlike the triangular and square numbers, the patterns involved in the construction of decagonal numbers are not rotationally symmetrical. Specifically, the n-th decagonal numbers counts the dots in a pattern of n nested decagons, all sharing a common corner, where the ith decagon in the pattern has sides made of i dots spaced one unit apart from each other. The n-th decagonal number is given by the following formula

$d_n = 4n^2 - 3n$.

The first few decagonal numbers are:

0, 1, 10, 27, 52, 85, 126, 175, 232, 297, 370, 451, 540, 637, 742, 855, 976, 1105, 1242, 1387, 1540, 1701, 1870, 2047, 2232, 2425, 2626, 2835, 3052, 3277, 3510, 3751, 4000, 4257, 4522, 4795, 5076, 5365, 5662, 5967, 6280, 6601, 6930, 7267, 7612, 7965, 8326 (sequence A001107 in the OEIS).

The nth decagonal number can also be calculated by adding the square of n to thrice the (n−1)th pronic number or, to put it algebraically, as

$$D_n = n^2 + 3\left(n^2 - n\right)$$.

== Properties ==
- Decagonal numbers consistently alternate parity.
- $D_n$ is the sum of the first $n$ natural numbers congruent to 1 mod 8.
- $D_n$ is number of divisors of $48^{n-1}$.
- The only decagonal numbers that are square numbers are 0 and 1.
- The decagonal numbers follow the following recurrence relations:

$$D_n=D_{n-1}+8n-7 , D_0=0$$
$$D_n=2D_{n-1}-D_{n-2}+8, D_0=0,D_1=1$$
$$D_n=3D_{n-1}-3D_{n-2}+D_{n-3}, D_0=0, D_1=1, D_2=10$$

== Sum of reciprocals ==
The sum of the reciprocals of the decagonal numbers admits a simple closed form:
$$\sum_{n=1}^{\infty}\frac{1}{4n^{2}-3n}+\sum_{n=1}^{\infty}\frac{1}{n\left(4n-3\right)}=\ln\left(2\right)+\frac{\pi}{6}.$$

=== Proof ===
This derivation rests upon the method of adding a "constructive zero":
$$\begin{align}
\sum_{n=1}^{\infty}\frac{1}{n\left(4n-3\right)} & {} =\frac{4}{3}\sum_{n=1}^{\infty}\left(\frac{1}{4n-3}-\frac{1}{4n}\right) \\
&=\frac{2}{3}\sum_{n=1}^{\infty}\left(\frac{2}{4n-3}-\frac{2}{4n}+\left(\frac{1}{4n-1}-\frac{1}{4n-2}\right)-\left(\frac{1}{4n-1}-\frac{1}{4n-2}\right)\right)
\end{align}$$
Rearranging and considering the individual sums:
$$\begin{align}
&= \frac{2}{3} \sum_{n=1}^{\infty} \left[ \left(\frac{1}{4n-3} - \frac{1}{4n-2} + \frac{1}{4n-1} - \frac{1}{4n} \right) + \left(\frac{1}{4n-2} - \frac{1}{4n} \right) + \left(\frac{1}{4n-3} - \frac{1}{4n-1} \right) \right] \\
&= \frac{2}{3} \sum_{n=1}^{\infty} \left( \frac{1}{4n-3} - \frac{1}{4n-2} + \frac{1}{4n-1} - \frac{1}{4n} \right) + \frac{1}{3} \sum_{n=1}^{\infty} \left( \frac{1}{2n-1} - \frac{1}{2n} \right) + \frac{2}{3} \sum_{n=1}^{\infty} \left( \frac{1}{2(2n-1)-1} - \frac{1}{2(2n)-1} \right) \\
&= \frac{2}{3} \sum_{n=1}^{\infty} \frac{(-1)^{n+1}}{n} + \frac{1}{3} \sum_{n=1}^{\infty} \frac{(-1)^{n+1}}{n} + \frac{2}{3} \sum_{n=1}^{\infty} \frac{(-1)^{n+1}}{2n-1} \\
&= \ln\left(2\right)+\frac{\pi}{6}.
\end{align}$$

== Test for decagonal numbers ==
To test whether a given positive integer x is a decagonal number, one can compute
$$n= \frac{\sqrt{16x+9}+3}{8}.$$
If n is an integer, then x is the n-th decagonal number. If n is not an integer, then x is not decagonal.
