= Heptagonal number =

Type of figurate number constructed by combining heptagons

In mathematics, a heptagonal number is a figurate number that is constructed by combining heptagons with ascending size. The n-th heptagonal number is given by the formula

$$H_n=\frac{5n^2 - 3n}{2}$$.

The first five heptagonal numbers.

The first few heptagonal numbers are:

0, 1, 7, 18, 34, 55, 81, 112, 148, 189, 235, 286, 342, 403, 469, 540, 616, 697, 783, 874, 970, 1071, 1177, 1288, 1404, 1525, 1651, 1782, … (sequence A000566 in the OEIS)

== Parity ==
The parity of heptagonal numbers follows the pattern odd-odd-even-even. Like square numbers, the digital root in base 10 of a heptagonal number can only be 1, 4, 7 or 9. Five times a heptagonal number, plus 1 equals a triangular number.

== Additional properties ==
- The heptagonal numbers have several notable formulas:

$$H_{m+n}=H_m+H_n+5mn$$
$$H_{m-n}=H_m+H_n-5mn+3n$$
$$H_m-H_n=\frac{(5(m+n)-3)(m-n)}{2}$$
$$40H_n+9=(10n-3)^2$$

== Sum of reciprocals ==
A formula for the sum of the reciprocals of the heptagonal numbers is given by:

$$\begin{align}\sum_{n=1}^\infty \frac{2}{n(5n-3)}
&= \frac{1}{15}{\pi}{\sqrt{25-10\sqrt{5}}}+\frac{2}{3}\ln(5)+\frac{{1}+\sqrt{5}}{3}\ln\left(\frac{1}{2}\sqrt{10-2\sqrt{5}}\right)+\frac{{1}-\sqrt{5}}{3}\ln\left(\frac{1}{2}\sqrt{10+2\sqrt{5}}\right)\\
&=\frac13\left(\frac{\pi}{\sqrt[4]{5\,\phi^6}}+\frac52\ln(5) -\sqrt5 \ln(\phi)\right)\\
&=1.3227792531223888567\dots
\end{align}$$

with golden ratio $\phi = \tfrac{1+\sqrt5}2$.

== Heptagonal roots ==
In analogy to the square root of x, one can calculate the heptagonal root of x, meaning the number of terms in the sequence up to and including x.

The heptagonal root of x is given by the formula

$$n = \frac{\sqrt{40x + 9} + 3}{10},$$

which is obtained by using the quadratic formula to solve $x = \frac{5n^2 - 3n}{2}$ for its unique positive root n.
