= Centered dodecahedral number =

Centered figurate number representing a dodecahedron

- Total no. of terms: Infinity
- Subsequence of: Polyhedral numbers
- Formula: $(2n+1)\,(5n^2+5n+1)$
- First terms: 1, 33, 155, 427, 909, 1661
- OEIS index: A005904; Centered dodecahedral

In mathematics, a centered dodecahedral number is a centered figurate number that represents a dodecahedron. The centered dodecahedral number for a specific n is given by

$$(2n+1)\left(5n^2+5n+1\right)$$

The first such numbers are: 1, 33, 155, 427, 909, 1661, 2743, 4215, 6137, 8569, … (sequence A005904 in the OEIS).

== Congruence Relations ==
- $CDC(n) \equiv 1 \pmod{2}$
- $CDC(n) \equiv 1-n \pmod{3}$
- $CDC(n) \equiv 2n+1 \pmod{3,5,6,10}$
