= 1105 (number) =

← 1104	1105	1106 →
- List of numbers; Integers; ← 0 1k 2k 3k 4k 5k 6k 7k 8k 9k →
- Cardinal: one thousand one hundred five
- Ordinal: 1105th (one thousand one hundred fifth)
- Factorization: 5 × 13 × 17
- Divisors: 1, 5, 13, 17, 65, 85, 221, 1105
- Greek numeral: ,ΑΡΕ´
- Roman numeral: MCV, mcv
- Binary: 10001010001_{2}
- Ternary: 1111221_{3}
- Senary: 5041_{6}
- Octal: 2121_{8}
- Duodecimal: 781_{12}
- Hexadecimal: 451_{16}

1105 (eleven hundred [and] five, or one thousand one hundred [and] five) is the natural number following 1104 and preceding 1106.

== Mathematical properties ==
1105 is the smallest positive integer that is a sum of two positive squares in exactly four different ways, a property that can be connected (via the sum of two squares theorem) to its factorization 5 × 13 × 17 as the product of the three smallest prime numbers that are congruent to 1 modulo 4. It is also the second-smallest Carmichael number, after 561, one of the first four Carmichael numbers identified by R. D. Carmichael in his 1910 paper introducing this concept. It is also a Fermat pseudoprime, a decagonal number, and a centered square number.

It is a member of the Moser–de Bruijn sequence of sums of distinct powers of four.
