= 365th Division =

365th Division may refer to:

- 365th Infantry Division, Wehrmacht, Germany
- 365th Rifle Division, Soviet Union

== See also ==
- List of military divisions by number
- 365th (disambiguation)
