= 496 (number) =

← 495	496	497 →
- List of numbers; Integers; ← 0 100 200 300 400 500 600 700 800 900 →
- Cardinal: four hundred ninety-six
- Ordinal: 496th (four hundred ninety-sixth)
- Factorization: 2^{4} × 31
- Divisors: 1, 2, 4, 8, 16, 31, 62, 124, 248, 496
- Greek numeral: ΥϞϚ´
- Roman numeral: CDXCVI, cdxcvi
- Binary: 111110000_{2}
- Ternary: 200101_{3}
- Senary: 2144_{6}
- Octal: 760_{8}
- Duodecimal: 354_{12}
- Hexadecimal: 1F0_{16}

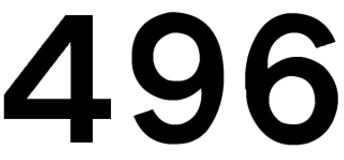
Representation of the number

496 (four hundred [and] ninety-six) is the natural number following 495 and preceding 497.

== In mathematics ==
496 is most notable for being the third perfect number, and one of the earliest numbers to be recognized as such; its factors (1, 2, 4, 8, 16, 31, 62, 124, 248) sum to 496.

It is also a triangular and a hexagonal number. and a centered nonagonal number. Being the 31st triangular number, 496 is the smallest counterexample to the hypothesis that one more than an even triangular prime-indexed number is a prime number. It is the largest happy number less than 500.

496 is also a harmonic divisor number.

The group E_{8} has real dimension 496.

== In physics ==
The number 496 is a very important number in superstring theory. In 1984 (coincidentally 4 times 496), Michael Green and John H. Schwarz realized that one of the necessary conditions for a superstring theory to make sense is that the dimension of the gauge group of type I string theory must be 496. The group is therefore SO(32). Their discovery started the first superstring revolution. It was realized in 1985 that the heterotic string can admit another possible gauge group, namely E_{8} x E_{8}.

== Telephone numbers ==
The UK's Ofcom reserves telephone numbers in many dialing areas in the 496 local block for fictional purposes, such as 0114 496-1234.

== See also ==
- AD 496
