= Centered icosahedral number =

Three-dimensional figurate centered icosahedral numbers

- Total no. of terms: Infinity
- Subsequence of: Polyhedral numbers
- Formula: $\frac{(2n+1)\,(5n^2+5n+3)}{3}$
- First terms: 1, 13, 55, 147, 309, 561, 923
- OEIS index: A005902; Centered icosahedral

In mathematics, the centered icosahedral numbers also known as cuboctahedral numbers are a sequence of numbers, describing two different representations for these numbers as three-dimensional figurate numbers. As centered icosahedral numbers, they are centered numbers representing points arranged in the shape of a regular icosahedron. As cuboctahedral numbers, they represent points arranged in the shape of a cuboctahedron, and are a magic number for the face-centered cubic lattice. The centered icosahedral number for a specific $n$ is given by $\frac{(2n+1)\left(5n^2+5n+3\right)}{3}.$

The first such numbers are

1, 13, 55, 147, 309, 561, 923, 1415, 2057, 2869, 3871, 5083, 6525, 8217, ... (sequence A005902 in the OEIS).
