= 1002 (number) =

← 1001	1002	1003 →
- List of numbers; Integers; ← 0 1k 2k 3k 4k 5k 6k 7k 8k 9k →
- Cardinal: one thousand [and] two
- Ordinal: 1002nd (one thousand [and] second)
- Factorization: 2 × 3 × 167
- Divisors: 1, 2, 6, 167, 334, 501, 1002
- Greek numeral: ,ΑΒ´
- Roman numeral: MII, mii
- Binary: 1111101010_{2}
- Ternary: 1101010_{3}
- Senary: 4350_{6}
- Octal: 1752_{8}
- Duodecimal: 6B6_{12}
- Hexadecimal: 3EA_{16}
- Tamil: ௲௨
- Chinese: 一千零二 (standard) 壹仟零貳 (formal)
- Punjabi: ੧੦੦੨

1002 (one thousand [and] two) is the natural number following 1001 and preceding 1003.

== In mathematics ==
The prime factorization of 1002 is 2 * 3 * 167, meaning that 1002 is a composite number with 7 divisors. It is also the number of partitions of the number 22, a generalized pentadecagonal number, a generalized heptadecagonal number, and the smallest number (not including 1) such that its binary representation ends with its ternary representation.

1002 is a number written in base of triangular numbers

It is the ternary numeral system representation of the number 29.

In November 2005, J. K. Andersen discovered a sexy quadruplet that has 1002 digits in total.

== In reading and writing ==
The number 1002 is used primarily as an example to analyze how young children read and write 4-digit numbers containing embedded zeros. In reading, children commonly mistook 1002 as 102. (Note: Children often treat zero as something that can be ignored instead of understanding its formal role as a placeholder. Alternatively, it could simply be an attempt to interpret an unfamiliar 4-digit number using a familiar 3-digit format.) And in writing, first grade children frequently wrote the 3-digit number "one hundred two" as 1002. (Note: This is a common mistake that happens since children tries spelling numbers phonetically based on how it sounds (one hundred = 100, and two = 2).) They treat the phrase as two separate entities rather than grasping the overall place value rules of the written numeration system.
