= 1001 (number) =

| ← 1000 | 1001 | 1002 → |
- List of numbers; Integers; ← 0 1k 2k 3k 4k 5k 6k 7k 8k 9k →
- Cardinal: one thousand [and] one
- Ordinal: 1001st (one thousand [and] first)
- Factorization: 7 × 11 × 13
- Divisors: 1, 7, 11, 13, 77, 91, 143, 1001
- Greek numeral: ,ΑΑ´
- Roman numeral: MI, mi
- Roman numeral (unicode): MI, mi, ↀI
- Unicode symbol: ↀI
- Greek prefix: chilia-ena-
- Binary: 1111101001_{2}
- Ternary: 1101002_{3}
- Senary: 4345_{6}
- Octal: 1751_{8}
- Duodecimal: 6B5_{12}
- Hexadecimal: 3E9_{16}
- Tamil: ௲௧
- Chinese: 千一
- Punjabi: ੧੦੦੧

1001 (one thousand [and] one) is the natural number following 1000 and preceding 1002.

== In mathematics ==
1001 is a sphenic number, a pentagonal number, a pentatope number, the 14th number $k$ such as that $k|(10^{k + 1} - 1)$, and the first four-digit palindromic number. Scheherazade numbers always have 1001 as a factor.

=== Divisibility by 7, 11 and 13 ===
Two properties of 1001 are the basis of a divisibility test for 7, 11 and 13. The method is along the same lines as the divisibility rule for 11 using the property 10 ≡ -1 (mod 11). The two properties of 1001 are

1001 = 7 × 11 × 13 in prime factors
103 ≡ -1 (mod 1001)

The method simultaneously tests for divisibility by any of the factors of 1001. First, the digits of the number being tested are grouped in blocks of three. The odd numbered groups are summed. The sum of the even numbered groups is then subtracted from the sum of the odd numbered groups. The test number is divisible by 7, 11 or 13 iff the result of the summation is divisible by 7, 11 or 13 respectively.

Example:

Number under test, N = 22 872 563 219
Sum of odd groups, So = 219 + 872 = 1091
Sum of even groups, Se = 563 + 22 = 585
Total sum, S = So - Se = 1091 - 585 = 506
506 = 46 × 11

Since 506 is divisible by 11 then N is also divisible by 11. If the total sum is still too large to conveniently test for divisibility, and is longer than three digits, then the algorithm can be repeated to obtain a smaller number.

On the Windows calculator, 1001 is the smallest positive integer whose reciprocal is automatically displayed in scientific notation. On Windows Calculator, numbers larger than 10^{32} and non-terminating decimals smaller than 0.001 or 10^{−3} are always displayed exponentially.

Any three-digit number multiplied by 1001 will replicate itself alongside resulting in a six-digit number (for example 382 multiplied by 1001 gives 382382). Any such six-digit number will always be divisible by 7, 11 and 13, although it is not obvious if one does not know the factors of 1001. This forms the basis of a common arithmetic trick.

== In other fields ==
In The Book of One Thousand and One Nights, Scheherazade tells her husband the king a new story every night for 1,001 nights, staving off her execution. From this, 1001 is sometimes used as a generic term for "a very large number", starting with a large number (1000) and going beyond it:

1001 uses for...
1001 ways to...

In Arabic, this is usually phrased as "one thousand things and one thing", e.g.:

The Book of One Thousand and One Nights, in Arabic Alf layla wa layla (Arabic: ألف ليلة و ليلة), literally "One thousand nights and a night".

1001 was the name of a popular British detergent in the 1960s, supposedly with "1001 uses".

In the Mawlawiyyah order of Sufi Islam, a novice must complete 1001 days of prayer before becoming a dada, or junior teacher of the faith.

In many cases, including the title "Thousand and One Nights", 1001 is meant to indicate a "big number", and need not be taken literally. A book published in 2007 titled 40 Days & 1001 Nights describes a journey through the Islamic world.

Among them are recent books aiming to introduce significant works in various fields:

1001 Books You Must Read Before You Die
1001 Movies You Must See Before You Die
1001 Albums You Must Hear Before You Die

There are also many film titles starting with 1001. For example:

Bugs Bunny's 3rd Movie: 1001 Rabbit Tales

The NBA draft lottery uses a lottery with 1,001 combinations by selecting four balls out of 14, then disregards the combination 11, 12, 13 and 14 to produce 1,000 outcomes.

"1001" was a hidden track on the Australian release of Two Shoes, the second album by the Cat Empire.

Buckminster Fuller called 1001 a Scheherazade number in his book Synergetics, since Scheherazade was the name of the story-telling wife in The Book of One Thousand and One Nights.
