= 366 (number) =

| ← 365 | 366 | 367 → |
- List of numbers; Integers; ← 0 100 200 300 400 500 600 700 800 900 →
- Cardinal: three hundred sixty-six
- Ordinal: 366th (three hundred sixty-sixth)
- Factorization: 2 × 3 × 61
- Divisors: 1, 2, 3, 6, 61, 122, 183, 366
- Greek numeral: ΤΞϚ´
- Roman numeral: CCCLXVI, ccclxvi
- Binary: 101101110_{2}
- Ternary: 111120_{3}
- Senary: 1410_{6}
- Octal: 556_{8}
- Duodecimal: 266_{12}
- Hexadecimal: 16E_{16}

366 (three hundred [and] sixty six) is the natural number following 365 and preceding 367. In Roman numerals, it is written as CCCLXVI.

== In mathematics ==
The prime factorizations of 366 are 2 × 3 × 61, meaning it is a composite number. 366 is also a sphenic number.

The value of p(366) is prime.

366 is the number of unimodular 2 X 2 matrices having all terms in {0,1,...,12} and inverses with all terms integers.

== In timekeeping ==
A leap year is a calendar year that contains 366 days, one additional day than a common year which is February 29. The 366th day (or 13th month) is added to keep the calendar year synced with the astronomical year or seasonal year.
