= Centered triangular number =

Centered figurate number that represents a triangle with a dot in the center

A centered (or centred) triangular number is a centered figurate number that represents an equilateral triangle with a dot in the center and all its other dots surrounding the center in successive equilateral triangular layers.

This is also the number of points of a hexagonal lattice with nearest-neighbor coupling whose distance from a given point is less than or equal to $n$.

The following image shows the building of the centered triangular numbers by using the associated figures: at each step, the previous triangle (shown in red) is surrounded by a triangular layer of new dots (in blue).

The first eight centered triangular numbers on a hex grid

== Properties ==
- The gnomon of the n-th centered triangular number, corresponding to the (n + 1)-th triangular layer, is:

$$C_{3,n+1} - C_{3,n} = 3(n+1).$$

- The n-th centered triangular number, corresponding to n layers plus the center, is given by the formula:

$$C_{3,n} = 1 + 3 \frac{n(n+1)}{2} = \frac{3n^2 + 3n + 2}{2}.$$

- Each centered triangular number has a remainder of 1 when divided by 3, and the quotient (if positive) is the previous regular triangular number.
- Each centered triangular number from 10 onwards is the sum of three consecutive regular triangular numbers.
- For n > 2, the sum of the first n centered triangular numbers is the magic constant for an n by n normal magic square.
- It is the difference of two tetrahedral numbers given by the formula:
  $$\begin{align}
& C_{3,n} = Te_{n} - Te_{n-3}, n>3
\end{align}$$

=== Relationship with centered square numbers ===
The centered triangular numbers can be expressed in terms of the centered square numbers:

$$C_{3,n} = \frac{3C_{4,n} + 1}{4},$$

where

$$C_{4,n} = n^{2} + (n+1)^{2}.$$

== Lists of centered triangular numbers ==
The first centered triangular numbers (C_{3,n} < 3000) are:

1, 4, 10, 19, 31, 46, 64, 85, 109, 136, 166, 199, 235, 274, 316, 361, 409, 460, 514, 571, 631, 694, 760, 829, 901, 976, 1054, 1135, 1219, 1306, 1396, 1489, 1585, 1684, 1786, 1891, 1999, 2110, 2224, 2341, 2461, 2584, 2710, 2839, 2971, … (sequence A005448 in the OEIS).

The first simultaneously triangular and centered triangular numbers (C_{3,n} = T_{N} < 10^{9}) are:

1, 10, 136, 1 891, 26 335, 366 796, 5 108 806, 71 156 485, 991 081 981, … (sequence A128862 in the OEIS).

== The generating function ==
If the centered triangular numbers are treated as the coefficients of the McLaurin series of a function, that function converges for all $|x| < 1$, in which case it can be expressed as the meromorphic generating function

$$1 + 4x + 10x^2 + 19x^3 + 31x^4 +~... = \frac{1-x^3}{(1-x)^4} = \frac{x^2+x+1}{(1-x)^3} ~.$$
