= 495 (number) =

Natural number

← 494	495	496 →
- List of numbers; Integers; ← 0 100 200 300 400 500 600 700 800 900 →
- Cardinal: four hundred ninety-five
- Ordinal: 495th (four hundred ninety-fifth)
- Factorization: 3^{2} × 5 × 11
- Divisors: 1, 3, 5, 9, 11, 15, 33, 45, 55, 99, 165, 495
- Greek numeral: ΥϞΕ´
- Roman numeral: CDXCV, cdxcv
- Binary: 111101111_{2}
- Ternary: 200100_{3}
- Senary: 2143_{6}
- Octal: 757_{8}
- Duodecimal: 353_{12}
- Hexadecimal: 1EF_{16}

495 (four hundred [and] ninety-five) is the natural number following 494 and preceding 496.

== Mathematics ==
- It is a composite number, with the divisors being 1, 3, 5, 9, 11, 15, 33, 45, 55, 99, 165, and 495.
- It is a generalized pentagonal number.
- It is a pentatope number.

=== Kaprekar's routine ===
The Kaprekar's routine algorithm is defined as follows for three-digit numbers:

1. Take any three-digit number, other than repdigits such as 111. Leading zeros are allowed.
2. Arrange the digits in descending and then in ascending order to get two three-digit numbers, adding leading zeros if necessary.
3. Subtract the smaller number from the bigger number.
4. Go back to step 2 and repeat.

Repeating this process will always reach 495 in a few steps. Once 495 is reached, the process stops because 954 – 459 = 495.

The number 6174 has the same property for the four-digit numbers, albeit has a much greater percentage of workable numbers.

== See also ==
- Collatz conjecture — sequence of unarranged-digit numbers always ends with the number 1.
