= 365th =

365th may refer to:

- 365th Bombardment Squadron, inactive United States Air Force unit
- 365th Electronic Warfare Group previously 1st Search Attack Group, United States Army Air Forces unit that served during World War II. 365 EWG was a 'paper' designation given to the unit when it did not have physical form, equipment, or personnel.
- 365th Fighter Group or 132nd Fighter Wing (132d W), United States Air Force unit assigned to the Iowa Air National Guard
- 365th Fighter Squadron or 163rd Fighter Squadron, unit of the Indiana Air National Guard 122nd Fighter Wing

== See also ==
- 365 (number)
- 365 (disambiguation)
- 365, the year 365 (CCCLXV) of the Julian calendar
- 365 BC
