= Pentatope number =

Number in the 5th cell of any row of Pascal's triangle

Derivation of pentatope numbers from a left-justified Pascal's triangle. Natural numbers Triangular numbers Tetrahedral numbers Pentatope numbers 5-simplex numbers 6-simplex numbers 7-simplex numbers

In number theory, a pentatope number (or hypertetrahedral number or triangulo-triangular number) is a number in the fifth cell of any row of Pascal's triangle starting with the 5-term row 1 4 6 4 1, either from left to right or from right to left. It is named because it represents the number of 3-dimensional unit spheres which can be packed into a pentatope (a 4-dimensional tetrahedron) of increasing side lengths.

The first few numbers of this kind are:

1, 5, 15, 35, 70, 126, 210, 330, 495, 715, 1001, 1365 (sequence A000332 in the OEIS)

A pentatope with side length 5 contains 70 3-spheres. Each layer represents one of the first five tetrahedral numbers. For example, the bottom (green) layer has 35 spheres in total.

Pentatope numbers belong to the class of figurate numbers, which can be represented as regular, discrete geometric patterns.

== Formula ==
The formula for the nth pentatope number is represented by the 4th rising factorial of n divided by the factorial of 4:

$$P_n = \frac{n^{\overline 4}}{4!} = \frac{n(n+1)(n+2)(n+3)}{24} .$$

The pentatope numbers can also be represented as binomial coefficients:

$$P_n = \binom{n + 3}{4} ,$$

which is the number of distinct quadruples that can be selected from n + 3 objects, and it is read aloud as "n plus three choose four".

== Properties ==
Two of every three pentatope numbers are also pentagonal numbers. To be precise, the (3k − 2)th pentatope number is always the $\left(\tfrac{3k^2 - k}{2}\right)$th pentagonal number and the (3k − 1)th pentatope number is always the $\left(\tfrac{3k^2 + k}{2}\right)$th pentagonal number. The (3k)th pentatope number is the generalized pentagonal number obtained by taking the negative index $-\tfrac{3k^2 + k}{2}$ in the formula for pentagonal numbers. (These expressions always give integers).

The infinite sum of the reciprocals of all pentatope numbers is 4/3. This can be derived using telescoping series.

$$\sum_{n=1}^\infty \frac{4!}{n(n+1)(n+2)(n+3)} = \frac{4}{3}.$$

Pentatope numbers can be represented as the sum of the first n tetrahedral numbers:

$$P_n = \sum_{ k =1}^n \mathrm{Te}_k,$$

and are also related to tetrahedral numbers themselves:

$$P_n = \tfrac{1}{4}(n+3) \mathrm{Te}_n.$$

No prime number is the predecessor of a pentatope number (it needs to check only −1 and 4 = 2^{2}), and the largest semiprime which is the predecessor of a pentatope number is 1819.

Similarly, the only primes preceding a 6-simplex number are 83 and 461.

== Test for pentatope numbers ==
We can derive this test from the formula for the nth pentatope number.

Given a positive integer x, to test whether it is a pentatope number we can compute the positive root using Ferrari's method:

$$n = \frac{\sqrt{5+4\sqrt{24x+1}} - 3}{2}.$$

The number x is pentatope if and only if n is a natural number. In that case x is the nth pentatope number.

== Generating function ==
The generating function for pentatope numbers is

$$\frac{x}{(1-x)^5} = x + 5x^2 + 15x^3 + 35x^4 + \dots .$$

== Applications ==
In biochemistry, the pentatope numbers represent the number of possible arrangements of n different polypeptide subunits in a tetrameric (tetrahedral) protein.
