= Centered polygonal number =

Class of series of figurate numbers, each having a central dot

Proof without words that each centered k-gonal number is k times the previous triangular number, plus 1

In mathematics, the centered polygonal numbers are a class of series of figurate numbers, each formed by a central dot, surrounded by polygonal layers of dots with a constant number of sides. Each side of a polygonal layer contains one more dot than each side in the previous layer; so starting from the second polygonal layer, each layer of a centered k-gonal number contains k more dots than the previous layer.

== Examples ==
Each centered k-gonal number in the series is k times the previous triangular number, plus 1. This can be formalized by the expression $\frac{kn(n+1)}{2} +1$, where n is the series rank, starting with 0 for the initial 1. For example, each centered square number in the series is four times the previous triangular number, plus 1. This can be formalized by the expression $\frac{4n(n+1)}{2} +1$.

These series consist of the

- centered triangular numbers 1, 4, 10, 19, 31, 46, 64, 85, 109, 136, 166, 199, ... (OEIS: A005448),
- centered square numbers 1, 5, 13, 25, 41, 61, 85, 113, 145, 181, 221, 265, ... (OEIS: A001844), which are exactly the sum of consecutive squares, i.e., n^{2} + (n − 1)^{2}.
- centered pentagonal numbers 1, 6, 16, 31, 51, 76, 106, 141, 181, 226, 276, 331, ... (OEIS: A005891),
- centered hexagonal numbers 1, 7, 19, 37, 61, 91, 127, 169, 217, 271, 331, 397, ... (OEIS: A003215), which are exactly the difference of consecutive cubes, i.e. n^{3} − (n − 1)^{3},
- centered heptagonal numbers 1, 8, 22, 43, 71, 106, 148, 197, 253, 316, 386, 463, ... (OEIS: A069099),
- centered octagonal numbers 1, 9, 25, 49, 81, 121, 169, 225, 289, 361, 441, 529, ... (OEIS: A016754), which are exactly the odd squares,
- centered nonagonal numbers 1, 10, 28, 55, 91, 136, 190, 253, 325, 406, 496, 595, ... (OEIS: A060544), which include all even perfect numbers except 6,
- centered decagonal numbers 1, 11, 31, 61, 101, 151, 211, 281, 361, 451, 551, 661, ... (OEIS: A062786),
- centered hendecagonal numbers 1, 12, 34, 67, 111, 166, 232, 309, 397, 496, 606, 727, ... (OEIS: A069125),
- centered dodecagonal numbers 1, 13, 37, 73, 121, 181, 253, 337, 433, 541, 661, 793, ... (OEIS: A003154), which are also the star numbers,

and so on.

The following diagrams show a few examples of centered polygonal numbers and their geometric construction. Compare these diagrams with the diagrams in Polygonal number.

centered triangular number	centered square number	centered pentagonal number	centered hexagonal number

=== Centered square numbers ===
1	5	13	25

=== Centered hexagonal numbers ===
1	7	19	37
*	*	*	*

As the sum of the first n hex numbers is n^{3}, the n-th hex number is n^{3} − (n−1)^{3}

== Formulas ==
As can be seen in the above diagrams, the nth centered k-gonal number can be obtained by placing k copies of the (n−1)th triangular number around a central point; therefore, the nth centered k-gonal number is equal to

$$C_{k,n} =\frac{kn}{2}(n-1)+1.$$

The difference of the n-th and the (n+1)-th consecutive centered k-gonal numbers is k(2n+1).

The n-th centered k-gonal number is equal to the n-th regular k-gonal number plus (n−1)^{2}.

Just as is the case with regular polygonal numbers, the first centered k-gonal number is 1. Thus, for any k, 1 is both k-gonal and centered k-gonal. The next number to be both k-gonal and centered k-gonal can be found using the formula:

$$\frac{k^2}{2}(k-1)+1$$

which tells us that 10 is both triangular and centered triangular, 25 is both square and centered square, etc.

Whereas a prime number p cannot be a polygonal number (except the trivial case, i.e. each p is the second p-gonal number), many centered polygonal numbers are primes. In fact, if k ≥ 3, k ≠ 8, k ≠ 9, then there are infinitely many centered k-gonal numbers which are primes (assuming the Bunyakovsky conjecture). Since all centered octagonal numbers are also square numbers, and all centered nonagonal numbers are also triangular numbers (and not equal to 3), thus both of them cannot be prime numbers.

== Sum of reciprocals ==
The sum of reciprocals for the centered k-gonal numbers is

$\frac{2\pi}{k\sqrt{1-\frac{8}{k}}}\tan\left(\frac{\pi}{2}\sqrt{1-\frac{8}{k}}\right)$, if k ≠ 8

$\frac{\pi^2}{8}$, if k = 8
