= 1003 (number) =

← 1002	1003	1004 →
- List of numbers; Integers; ← 0 1k 2k 3k 4k 5k 6k 7k 8k 9k →
- Cardinal: one thousand three
- Ordinal: 1003rd (one thousand third)
- Factorization: 17 × 59
- Divisors: 1, 17, 59, 1003
- Greek numeral: ,ΑΓ´
- Roman numeral: MIII, miii
- Binary: 1111101011_{2}
- Ternary: 1101011_{3}
- Senary: 4351_{6}
- Octal: 1753_{8}
- Duodecimal: 6B7_{12}
- Hexadecimal: 3EB_{16}

1003 (one thousand [and] three) is the natural number following 1002 and preceding 1004.

== In mathematics ==
1003 is an odd composite number. It is also a happy number, the smallest 4-digit brilliant number, and a Lucas 8-step number. 1003 is the 33rd term representing the vertex number of a square spiral whose first two edge lengths are the legs of the [3, 4, 5] primitive Pythagorean triple.

The number of times the digit 5 appears in the first 10^{4} digits of Catalan's constant is 1003. The number of symmetric polynomial functions of degree 4 of a symmetric matrix of indefinitely large size under joint row and column permutations is also 1003. Also, 1003 is the number of fusenes that possess 22 hexagons and C_{3h} symmetry containing 87 carbon atoms.

The term $\sum_{n=0}^{10}{1003}^{n}$ is prime.

=== Prime factorization ===
The prime factorization of 1003 is:

1003 = 17 × 59

This means that the divisors of 1003 are 1, 17, 59 and 1003.

Since the prime factorization of 1003 is the product of two distinct prime numbers, 1003 is a semiprime. It is also a square-free number, since no square divides it.

1003 is the smallest 4-digit brilliant number whose prime factorizations are concatenated in some order, is also brilliant, in other words, 5917 = 61 × 97.

== See also ==
- List of numbers
