= 365 (number) =

← 364	365	366 →
- List of numbers; Integers; ← 0 100 200 300 400 500 600 700 800 900 →
- Cardinal: three hundred sixty-five
- Ordinal: 365th (three hundred sixty-fifth)
- Factorization: 5 × 73
- Divisors: 1, 5, 73, 365
- Greek numeral: ΤΞΕ´
- Roman numeral: CCCLXV, ccclxv
- Binary: 101101101_{2}
- Ternary: 111112_{3}
- Senary: 1405_{6}
- Octal: 555_{8}
- Duodecimal: 265_{12}
- Hexadecimal: 16D_{16}

365 (three hundred [and] sixty-five) is the natural number following 364 and preceding 366.

== Mathematics ==
365 is a semiprime centered square number. It is also the fifth 38-gonal number.

It is the smallest number that has more than one expression as a sum of consecutive square numbers:

$$365 = 13^2 + 14^2$$
$$365 = 10^2 + 11^2 + 12^2$$

== Timekeeping ==
There are 365.2422 solar days in the mean tropical year. Several solar calendars have a year containing 365 days. Related to this, in Ontario, the driver's license learner's permit used to be called "365" because it was valid for only 366 days. Financial and scientific calculations often use a 365-day calendar to simplify daily rates.
