= Galileo's law of odd numbers =

Mechanical law describing falling objects

In classical mechanics and kinematics, Galileo's law of odd numbers states that the distance covered by a falling object in successive equal time intervals is linearly proportional to the odd numbers. That is, if a body falling from rest covers a certain distance during an arbitrary time interval, it will cover 1, 3, 5, 7, etc. times that distance in the subsequent time intervals of the same length. This mathematical model is accurate if the body is not subject to any forces besides uniform gravity (for example, it is falling in a vacuum in a uniform gravitational field). This law was established by Galileo Galilei who was the first to make quantitative studies of free fall.

== Explanation ==
Derivation of Galileo's law of odd numbers

=== Using a speed-time graph ===
The graph in the figure is a plot of speed versus time. Distance covered is the area under the line. Each time interval is coloured differently. The distance covered in the second and subsequent intervals is the area of its trapezium, which can be subdivided into triangles as shown. As each triangle has the same base and height, they have the same area as the triangle in the first interval. It can be observed that every interval has two more triangles than the previous one. Since the first interval has one triangle, this leads to the odd numbers.

=== Using the sum of first n odd numbers ===
From the equation for uniform linear acceleration, the distance covered
$$s = u t + \tfrac{1}{2} a t^2$$
for initial speed $u = 0,$ constant acceleration $a$ (acceleration due to gravity without air resistance), and time elapsed $t,$ it follows that the distance $s$ is proportional to $t^2$ (in symbols, $s \propto t^2$), thus the distance from the starting point are consecutive squares for integer values of time elapsed. The middle figure in the diagram is a visual proof that the sum of the first $n$ odd numbers is $n^2.$ In equations:

1	= 1	= 1^{2}
1 + 3	= 4	= 2^{2}
1 + 3 + 5	= 9	= 3^{2}
1 + 3 + 5 + 7	= 16	= 4^{2}
1 + 3 + 5 + 7 + 9	= 25	= 5^{2}

That the pattern continues forever can also be proven algebraically:
$$\begin{align}
\sum_{k=1}^n (2\,k-1)&= \frac{1}{2}\,\left( \sum_{k=1}^n (2\,k-1)+ \sum_{k=1}^n (2\,(n-k+1)-1) \right)\\
&= \frac{1}{2}\,\sum_{k=1}^n (2\,(n+1)-1-1)\\
&= n^2
\end{align}$$

To clarify this proof, since the $n$^{th} odd positive integer is $m \,\colon=\, 2 n - 1,$ if $S \,\colon=\, \sum_{k=1}^n (2\,k-1) \,=\, 1 + 3 + \cdots + (m-2) + m$ denotes the sum of the first $n$ odd integers then
$$\begin{alignat}{4}
S + S
&=\;\; 1     &&+\;\; 3  &&\;+ \cdots + (m-2) &&+\;\; m \\
&+\;\; m     &&+ (m-2)  &&\;+ \cdots +\;\; 3 &&+\;\; 1 \\
&=\; (m+1)   &&+ (m+1)  &&\;+ \cdots + (m+1) &&+ (m+1) \quad \text{ (} n \text{ terms)}\\
&=\; n \, (m+1) && && && && \\
\end{alignat}$$
so that $S = \tfrac{1}{2} \, n \, (m+1).$ Substituting $n = \tfrac{1}{2} (m + 1)$ and $m + 1 = 2 \, n$ gives, respectively, the formulas
$$1 + 3 + \cdots + m \;=\; \tfrac{1}{4} (m+1)^2 \quad \text{ and } \quad 1 + 3 + \cdots + (2 \, n - 1) \;=\; n^2$$
where the first formula expresses the sum entirely in terms of the odd integer $m$ while the second expresses it entirely in terms of $n,$ which is $m$'s ordinal position in the list of odd integers $1, 3, 5, \ldots.$

== See also ==
- Equations of motion – Equations that describe the behavior of a physical system
- Square numbers – Product of an integer with itself
