= 561 (number) =

| ← 560 | 561 | 562 → |
- List of numbers; Integers; ← 0 100 200 300 400 500 600 700 800 900 →
- Cardinal: five hundred sixty-one
- Ordinal: 561st (five hundred sixty-first)
- Factorization: 3 × 11 × 17
- Divisors: 1, 3, 11, 17, 33, 51, 187, 561
- Greek numeral: ΦΞΑ´
- Roman numeral: DLXI, dlxi
- Binary: 1000110001_{2}
- Ternary: 202210_{3}
- Senary: 2333_{6}
- Octal: 1061_{8}
- Duodecimal: 3A9_{12}
- Hexadecimal: 231_{16}

561 (five hundred [and] sixty-one) is the natural number following 560 and preceding 562.

== In mathematics ==
561 is a Fermat pseudoprime to base 2, a centered icosahedral number, the 33rd triangular number, and the 17th hexagonal number. It is a composite number, with the divisors being 1, 3, 11, 17, 33, 51, 187, and 561. Its prime factorization is 3 * 11 * 17.

=== Carmichael number ===
561 is most notable for being the first, and smallest Carmichael number. 561 is considered one since it satisfies the Korselt’s Criterion. A number satisfies the criterion if the number is an odd number, consists of a product of distinct primes, and satisfies (p − 1) | (n − 1) for every prime p dividing the number. It was first discovered by Václav Šimerka along with six more other numbers. (Note: The seven Carmichael numbers that Václav Šimerka discovered are 561, 1105, 1729, 2465, 2821, 6601, and 8911.)
