= 365 days =

365 days usually refers to the length of a common year.

It may also refer to:

== Cinema and television ==
- 365 Days (2015 film), a Telugu film
- 365 Days (2020 film), a Polish film
  - 365 Days: This Day, a 2022 sequel to the above
    - The Next 365 Days, a 2022 sequel to the above
- "365 Days", an episode in season 6 of The West Wing

== Music ==
- "365 Days", a 1977 song by Gary Glitter, B-side of "Oh What a Fool I've Been"
- "365 Days", a song by Lutricia McNeal
- "365 Days", a song by Song I-han
- "365 Days", a song by Victorious
- "365 Days", a song by ZZ Ward
- 365 Días, a 2012 album by Los Tucanes de Tijuana
