= Doubly triangular number =

Type of triangular number

Summing up to the n-th row of Floyd's triangle yields the n-th doubly triangular number

There are 21 colorings of the four corners of a square using three colors (up to symmetry), a doubly triangular number, formed by combining two of the six colorings of two opposite corners

In mathematics, the doubly triangular numbers are the numbers that appear within the sequence of triangular numbers, in positions that are also triangular numbers. That is, if $T_n=n(n+1)/2$ denotes the $n$th triangular number, then the doubly triangular numbers are the numbers of the form $T_{T_n}$.

== Sequence and formula ==
The doubly triangular numbers form the sequence

0, 1, 6, 21, 55, 120, 231, 406, 666, 1035, 1540, 2211, ...

The $n$th doubly triangular number is given by the quartic expression
$$T_{T_n} = \frac{n(n+1)(n^2+n+2)}{8}.$$

The sums of row sums of Floyd's triangle give the doubly triangular numbers. Another way of expressing this fact is that the sum of all of the numbers in the first $n$ rows of Floyd's triangle is the $n$th doubly triangular number.

== Sum of reciprocals ==
A formula for the sum of the reciprocals of the doubly triangular numbers is given by
$$\sum_{n=1}^{\infty}\frac{1}{T_{T_{n}}}=\sum_{n=1}^{\infty}\frac{8}{n\left(n+1\right)\left(n^{2}+n+2\right)}=6-\frac{4\pi}{\sqrt{7}}\tanh\left(\frac{\pi\sqrt{7}}{2}\right) = 1.252690...$$

== In combinatorial enumeration ==
Doubly triangular numbers arise naturally as numbers of unordered pairs of unordered pairs of objects, including pairs where both objects are the same:

- An example from mathematical chemistry is given by the numbers of overlap integrals between Slater-type orbitals.
- Another example of this phenomenon from combinatorics is that the doubly-triangular numbers count the number of two-edge undirected multigraphs on $n$ labeled vertices. In this setting, an edge is an unordered pair of vertices, and a two-edge graph is an unordered pair of edges. The number of possible edges is a triangular number, and the number of pairs of edges (allowing both edges to connect the same two vertices) is a doubly triangular number.
- In the same way, the doubly triangular numbers also count the number of distinct ways of coloring the four corners or the four edges of a square with $n$ colors, allowing some colors to be unused and counting two colorings as being the same when they differ from each other only by rotation or reflection of the square. The number of choices of colors for any two opposite features of the square is a triangular number, and a coloring of the whole square combines two of these colorings of pairs of opposite features.

When pairs with both objects the same are excluded, a different sequence arises, the tritriangular numbers $3,15,45,105,\dots$ which are given by the formula $\binom{\binom{n}{2}}{2}$.

== In numerology ==
Some numerologists and biblical studies scholars consider it significant that 666, the number of the beast, is a doubly triangular number.
