= Square triangular number =

Integer that is both a perfect square and a triangular number

Square triangular number 36 depicted as a triangular number and as a square number.

In mathematics, a square triangular number (or triangular square number) is a number which is both a triangular number and a square number, in other words, the sum of all integers from $1$ to $n$ has a square root that is an integer. There are infinitely many square triangular numbers; the first few are:

0, 1, 36, 1225, 41616, 1413721, 48024900, 1631432881, 55420693056, 1882672131025 (sequence A001110 in the OEIS)

N A001110	s^{2} = N A001109	t(t+1)/2 = N A001108
0	0	0
1	1	1
36	6	8
1225	35	49
41616	204	288
1413721	1189	1681
48024900	6930	9800

== Solution as a Pell equation ==
Write $N_k$ for the $k$th square triangular number, and write $s_k$ and $t_k$ for the sides of the corresponding square and triangle, so that

$\displaystyle N_k = s_k^2 = \frac{t_k(t_k+1)}{2}.$

Define the triangular root of a triangular number $N=\tfrac{n(n+1)}{2}$ to be $n$. In the form of the quadratic equation, $n^2 + n - 2N = 0$. From the quadratic formula,

$\displaystyle n = \frac{\sqrt{8N + 1} - 1}{2}.$

Therefore, $N$ is triangular ($n$ is an integer) if and only if $8N+1$ is square. Consequently, a square number $M^2$ is also triangular if and only if $8M^2+1$ is square, that is, there are numbers $x$ and $y$ such that $x^2-8y^2=1$. This is an instance of the Pell equation $x^2-ny^2=1$ with $n=8$. All Pell equations have the trivial solution $x=1,y=0$ for any $n$; this is called the zeroth solution, and indexed as $(x_0,y_0)=(1,0)$. If $(x_k,y_k)$ denotes the $k$th nontrivial solution to any Pell equation for a particular $n$, it can be shown by the method of descent that the next solution is

$$\displaystyle \begin{align}
x_{k+1} &= 2x_k x_1 - x_{k-1}, \\
y_{k+1} &= 2y_k x_1 - y_{k-1}.
\end{align}$$

Hence there are infinitely many solutions to any Pell equation for which there is one non-trivial one, which is true whenever $n$ is not a square. The first non-trivial solution when $n=8$ is easy to find: it is $(3,1)$. A solution $(x_k,y_k)$ to the Pell equation for $n=8$ yields a square triangular number and its square and triangular roots as follows:

$\displaystyle s_k = y_k , \quad t_k = \frac{x_k - 1}{2}, \quad N_k = y_k^2.$

Hence, the first square triangular number, derived from $(3,1)$, is $1$, and the next, derived from $6\cdot (3,1)-(1,0)=(17,6)$, is $36$.

The sequences $N_k$, $s_k$ and $t_k$ are the OEIS sequences OEIS: A001110, OEIS: A001109, and OEIS: A001108 respectively.

== Explicit formula ==
In 1778 Leonhard Euler determined the explicit formula

$\displaystyle N_k = \left( \frac{\left(3 + 2\sqrt{2}\right)^k - \left(3 - 2\sqrt{2}\right)^k}{4\sqrt{2}} \right)^2.$

Other equivalent formulas (obtained by expanding this formula) that may be convenient include

$$\displaystyle \begin{align}
N_k &= \tfrac{1}{32} \left( \left( 1 + \sqrt{2} \right)^{2k} - \left( 1 - \sqrt{2} \right)^{2k} \right)^2 \\
&= \tfrac{1}{32} \left( \left( 1 + \sqrt{2} \right)^{4k}-2 + \left( 1 - \sqrt{2} \right)^{4k} \right) \\
&= \tfrac{1}{32} \left( \left( 17 + 12\sqrt{2} \right)^k -2 + \left( 17 - 12\sqrt{2} \right)^k \right).
\end{align}$$

The corresponding explicit formulas for $s_k$ and $t_k$ are:

$$\displaystyle \begin{align}
s_k &= \frac{\left(3 + 2\sqrt{2}\right)^k - \left(3 - 2\sqrt{2}\right)^k}{4\sqrt{2}}, \\
t_k &= \frac{\left(3 + 2\sqrt{2}\right)^k + \left(3 - 2\sqrt{2}\right)^k - 2}{4}.
\end{align}$$

== Recurrence relations ==
The solution to the Pell equation can be expressed as a recurrence relation for the equation's solutions. This can be translated into recurrence equations that directly express the square triangular numbers, as well as the sides of the square and triangle involved. We have

$$\displaystyle \begin{align}
N_k &= 34N_{k-1} - N_{k-2} + 2,& \text{with }N_0 &= 0\text{ and }N_1 = 1; \\
N_k &= \left(6\sqrt{N_{k-1}} - \sqrt{N_{k-2}}\right)^2,& \text{with }N_0 &= 0\text{ and }N_1 = 1.
\end{align}$$

We have

$$\displaystyle \begin{align}
s_k &= 6s_{k-1} - s_{k-2},& \text{with }s_0 &= 0\text{ and }s_1 = 1; \\
t_k &= 6t_{k-1} - t_{k-2} + 2,& \text{with }t_0 &= 0\text{ and }t_1 = 1.
\end{align}$$

== Other characterizations ==
All square triangular numbers have the form $b^2c^2$, where $\tfrac{b}{c}$ is a convergent to the continued fraction expansion of $\sqrt2$, the square root of 2.

A. V. Sylwester gave a short proof that there are infinitely many square triangular numbers: If the $n$th triangular number $\tfrac{n(n+1)}{2}$ is square, then so is the larger $4n(n+1)$th triangular number, since:

$\displaystyle\frac{\bigl( 4n(n+1) \bigr) \bigl( 4n(n+1)+1 \bigr)}{2} = 4 \, \frac{n(n+1)}{2} \,\left(2n+1\right)^2.$

The left hand side of this equation is in the form of a triangular number, and as the product of three squares, the right hand side is square.

The generating function for the square triangular numbers is:

$$\frac{1+z}{(1-z)\left(z^2 - 34z + 1\right)} = 1 + 36z + 1225 z^2 + \cdots$$

== See also ==
- Cannonball problem, on numbers that are simultaneously square and square pyramidal
- Sixth power, numbers that are simultaneously square and cubical
