= Figurate number =

Size of a geometric arrangement of points

Derivation of hyperpyramidal figurate numbers from a left-justified Pascal's triangle. Natural numbers Triangular numbers Tetrahedral numbers Pentatope numbers 5-simplex numbers 6-simplex numbers 7-simplex numbers

The term figurate number is used by different writers for members of different sets of numbers, generalizing from triangular numbers to different shapes (polygonal numbers) and different dimensions (polyhedral numbers). The ancient Greek mathematicians already considered triangular numbers, polygonal numbers, tetrahedral numbers, and pyramidal numbers, and subsequent mathematicians have included other classes of these numbers including numbers defined from other types of polyhedra and from their analogs in other dimensions.

== Terminology ==
Some kinds of figurate number were discussed in the 16th and 17th centuries under the name "figural number".

In historical works about Greek mathematics the preferred term used to be figured number.

In a use going back to Jacob Bernoulli's Ars Conjectandi, the term figurate number is used for triangular numbers made up of successive integers, tetrahedral numbers made up of successive triangular numbers, etc. These turn out to be the binomial coefficients. In this usage the square numbers (4, 9, 16, 25, ...) would not be considered figurate numbers when viewed as arranged in a square.

A number of other sources use the term figurate number as synonymous for the polygonal numbers, either just the usual kind or both those and the centered polygonal numbers.

== History ==
The mathematical study of figurate numbers is said to have originated with Pythagoras, possibly based on Babylonian or Egyptian precursors. Generating whichever class of figurate numbers the Pythagoreans studied using gnomons is also attributed to Pythagoras. Unfortunately, there is no trustworthy source for these claims, because all surviving writings about the Pythagoreans are from centuries later. Speusippus is the earliest source to expose the view that ten, as the fourth triangular number, was in fact the tetractys, supposed to be of great importance for Pythagoreanism. Figurate numbers were a concern of the Pythagorean worldview. It was well understood that some numbers could have many figurations, e.g. 36 is a both a square and a triangle and also various rectangles.

The modern study of figurate numbers goes back to Pierre de Fermat, specifically the Fermat polygonal number theorem. Later, it became a significant topic for Euler, who gave an explicit formula for all triangular numbers that are also perfect squares, among many other discoveries relating to figurate numbers.

Figurate numbers have played a significant role in modern recreational mathematics. In research mathematics, figurate numbers are studied by way of the Ehrhart polynomials, polynomials that count the number of integer points in a polygon or polyhedron when it is expanded by a given factor.

== Triangular numbers and their analogs in higher dimensions ==
The triangular numbers for n = 1, 2, 3, ... are the result of the juxtaposition of the linear numbers (linear gnomons) for n = 1, 2, 3, ...:

*	*	*	*	*	*

These are the binomial coefficients $\textstyle \binom{n+1}{2}$. This is the case r = 2 of the fact that the rth diagonal of Pascal's triangle for r ≥ 0 consists of the figurate numbers for the r-dimensional analogs of triangles (r-dimensional simplices).

The simplicial polytopic numbers for r = 1, 2, 3, 4, ... are:

- $P_1(n) = \frac{n}{1} = \binom{n+0}{1}=\binom{n}{1}$ (linear numbers),
- $P_2(n) = \frac{n(n+1)}{2} = \binom{n+1}{2}$ (triangular numbers),
- $P_3(n) = \frac{n(n+1)(n+2)}{6} = \binom{n+2}{3}$ (tetrahedral numbers),
- $P_4(n) = \frac{n(n+1)(n+2)(n+3)}{24} = \binom{n+3}{4}$ (pentachoric numbers, pentatopic numbers, 4-simplex numbers),

$\qquad\vdots$

- $P_r(n) = \frac{n(n+1)(n+2)\cdots(n+r-1)}{r!} = \binom{n+(r-1)}{r}$ (r-topic numbers, r-simplex numbers).

The terms square number and cubic number derive from their geometric representation as a square or cube. The difference of two positive triangular numbers is a trapezoidal number.

== Gnomon ==
The gnomon is the piece added to a figurate number to transform it to the next larger one.

For example, the gnomon of the square number is the odd number, of the general form 2n + 1, n = 0, 1, 2, 3, .... The square of size 8 composed of gnomons looks like this:

$$\begin{matrix}1&2&3&4&5&6&7&8\\2&2&3&4&5&6&7&8\\3&3&3&4&5&6&7&8\\4&4&4&4&5&6&7&8\\5&5&5&5&5&6&7&8\\6&6&6&6&6&6&7&8\\7&7&7&7&7&7&7&8\\8&8&8&8&8&8&8&8\end{matrix}$$

To transform from the n-square (the square of size n) to the (n + 1)-square, one adjoins 2n + 1 elements: one to the end of each row (n elements), one to the end of each column (n elements), and a single one to the corner. For example, when transforming the 7-square to the 8-square, we add 15 elements; these adjunctions are the 8s in the above figure.

This gnomonic technique also provides a mathematical proof that the sum of the first n odd numbers is n^{2}; the figure illustrates 1 + 3 + 5 + 7 + 9 + 11 + 13 + 15 = 64 = 8^{2}.

There is a similar gnomon with centered hexagonal numbers adding up to make cubes of each integer number.
