= 302 (number) =

← 301	302	303 →
- List of numbers; Integers; ← 0 100 200 300 400 500 600 700 800 900 →
- Cardinal: three hundred two
- Ordinal: 302nd (three hundred second)
- Factorization: 2 × 151
- Divisors: 1, 2, 151, 302
- Greek numeral: ΤΒ´
- Roman numeral: CCCII, cccii
- Binary: 100101110_{2}
- Ternary: 102012_{3}
- Senary: 1222_{6}
- Octal: 456_{8}
- Duodecimal: 212_{12}
- Hexadecimal: 12E_{16}

302 (three hundred [and] two) is the natural number following 301 and preceding 303.

== In mathematics ==
- 302 is a happy number because repeatedly taking the sum of the squares of the digits of 302 will eventually result in 1.
- 302 is a nontotient number because it is an even number and phi(x)=302 has no solutions.
- There are 302 prime partitions of 40 meaning that there are 302 ways to separate 40 into the sum of prime parts.
- 302 is a Eulerian number, denoted as $A(n, k)$, which also appears twice in the collum for $n = 6$ as $A(6, 3)$, and $A(6, 4)$.
- 302 is the number of acyclic digraphs in 5 vertices.

== In other fields ==
An adult nematode worm has exactly 302 cells in its nervous system.
