= 210 (number) =

← 209	210	211 →
- ← 210 211 212 213 214 215 216 217 218 219 →: List of numbers; Integers; ← 0 100 200 300 400 500 600 700 800 900 →
- Cardinal: two hundred ten
- Ordinal: 210th (two hundred tenth)
- Factorization: 2 × 3 × 5 × 7
- Divisors: 1, 2, 3, 5, 6, 7, 10, 14, 15, 21, 30, 35, 42, 70, 105, 210
- Greek numeral: ΣΙ´
- Roman numeral: CCX, ccx
- Binary: 11010010_{2}
- Ternary: 21210_{3}
- Senary: 550_{6}
- Octal: 322_{8}
- Duodecimal: 156_{12}
- Hexadecimal: D2_{16}

210 (two hundred [and] ten) is the natural number following 209 and preceding 211.

== Mathematics ==
210 is an abundant number, and Harshad number. It is the product of the first four prime numbers (2, 3, 5, and 7), and thus a primorial, where it is the least common multiple of these four prime numbers. 210 is the first primorial number greater than 2 which is not adjacent to 2 primes (211 is prime, but 209 is not).

It is the sum of eight consecutive prime numbers, between 13 and the thirteenth prime number: 13 + 17 + 19 + 23 + 29 + 31 + 37 + 41 = 210.

It is the 20th triangular number (following 190 and preceding 231), a pentagonal number (following 176 and preceding 247), and the second smallest to be both triangular and pentagonal (the first is 1; the third is 40755). It is also a pentatope number.

It is also an idoneal number, a pronic number, and an untouchable number.

210 is index n = 7 in the number of ways to pair up {1, ..., 2n} so that the sum of each pair is prime; i.e., in {1, ..., 14}.

It is the largest number n where the number of distinct representations of n as the sum of two primes is at most the number of primes in the interval [n/2 , n − 2].
