= 216 (number) =

← 215	216	217 →
- ← 210 211 212 213 214 215 216 217 218 219 →: List of numbers; Integers; ← 0 100 200 300 400 500 600 700 800 900 →
- Cardinal: two hundred sixteen
- Ordinal: 216th (two hundred sixteenth)
- Factorization: 2^{3} × 3^{3}
- Divisors: 1, 2, 3, 4, 6, 8, 9, 12, 18, 24, 27, 36, 54, 72, 108, 216
- Greek numeral: ΣΙϚ´
- Roman numeral: CCXVI, ccxvi
- Binary: 11011000_{2}
- Ternary: 22000_{3}
- Senary: 1000_{6}
- Octal: 330_{8}
- Duodecimal: 160_{12}
- Hexadecimal: D8_{16}

216 (two hundred [and] sixteen) is the natural number following 215 and preceding 217. It is a cube, and is often called Plato's number, although it is not certain that this is the number intended by Plato.

== In mathematics ==
Visual proof that 3^{3} + 4^{3} + 5^{3} = 6^{3}

216 is the cube of 6, and the sum of three cubes:
$$216=6^3=3^3+4^3+5^3.$$
It is the smallest cube that can be represented as a sum of three positive cubes, making it the first nontrivial example for Euler's sum of powers conjecture. It is, moreover, the smallest number that can be represented as a sum of any number of distinct positive cubes in more than one way. It is a highly powerful number: the product $3\times 3$ of the exponents in its prime factorization $216 = 2^3\times 3^3$ is larger than the product of exponents of any smaller number.

Because there is no way to express it as the sum of the proper divisors of any other integer, it is an untouchable number. Although it is not a semiprime, the three closest numbers on either side of it are, making it the middle number between twin semiprime-triples, the smallest number with this property. Sun Zhiwei has conjectured that each natural number not equal to 216 can be written as either a triangular number, a prime number or as a triangular number plus a prime number; however, this is not possible for 216. If the conjecture is true, 216 would be the only number for which this is not possible.

There are 216 ordered pairs of four-element permutations whose products generate all the other permutations on four elements. There are also 216 fixed hexominoes, the polyominoes made from 6 squares, joined edge-to-edge. Here "fixed" means that rotations or mirror reflections of hexominoes are considered to be distinct shapes.

== In other fields ==
216 is one common interpretation of Plato's number, a number described in vague terms by Plato in the Republic. Other interpretations include 3600 and 12960000.

There are 216 colors in the web-safe color palette, a $6\times 6\times 6$ color cube.
