= 212 (number) =

← 211	212	213 →
- ← 210 211 212 213 214 215 216 217 218 219 →: List of numbers; Integers; ← 0 100 200 300 400 500 600 700 800 900 →
- Cardinal: two hundred twelve
- Ordinal: 212th (two hundred twelfth)
- Factorization: 2^{2} × 53
- Divisors: 1, 2, 4, 53, 106, 212
- Greek numeral: ΣΙΒ´
- Roman numeral: CCXII, ccxii
- Binary: 11010100_{2}
- Ternary: 21212_{3}
- Senary: 552_{6}
- Octal: 324_{8}
- Duodecimal: 158_{12}
- Hexadecimal: D4_{16}

212 (two hundred [and] twelve) is the natural number following 211 and preceding 213.

== In mathematics ==
212 is the sum for the first 26 totient integers.

It is the smallest 3-digit number where $\frac{XYZ}{\bigl(X \times Y \times Z\bigr)}$ is also a prime number.

== In other fields ==
On the Fahrenheit scale of temperature, 212° is the boiling point of water under standard pressure at sea level.
