= 217 (number) =

← 216	217	218 →
- ← 210 211 212 213 214 215 216 217 218 219 →: List of numbers; Integers; ← 0 100 200 300 400 500 600 700 800 900 →
- Cardinal: two hundred seventeen
- Ordinal: 217th (two hundred seventeenth)
- Factorization: 7 × 31
- Divisors: 1, 7, 31, 217
- Greek numeral: ΣΙΖ´
- Roman numeral: CCXVII, ccxvii
- Binary: 11011001_{2}
- Ternary: 22001_{3}
- Senary: 1001_{6}
- Octal: 331_{8}
- Duodecimal: 161_{12}
- Hexadecimal: D9_{16}

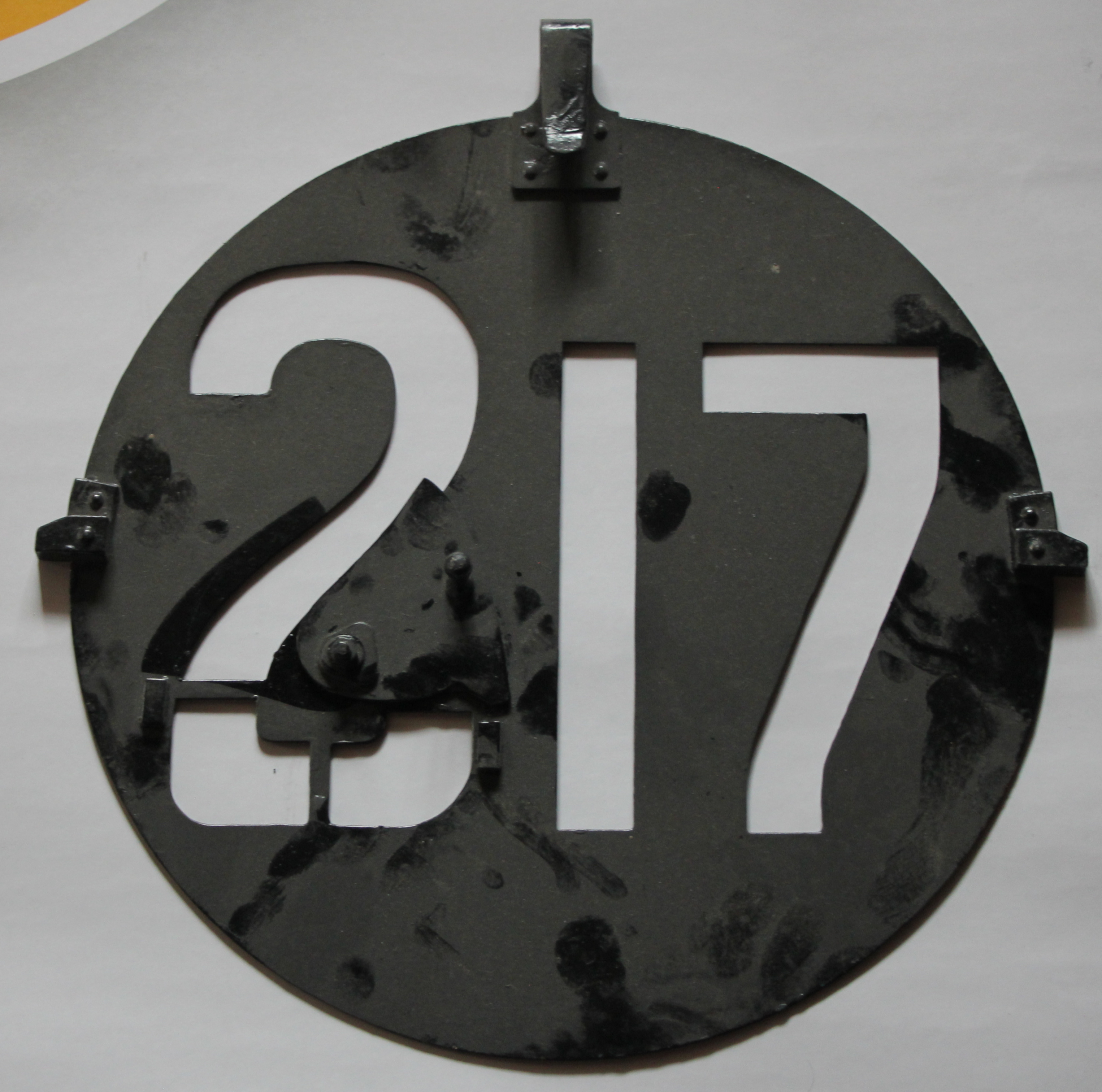

217 (two hundred [and] seventeen) is the natural number following 216 and preceding 218.

== In mathematics ==
217 is a centered hexagonal number, a 12-gonal number, a centered 36-gonal number, a Fermat pseudoprime to base 5, and a Blum integer. It is both the sum of two positive cubes and the difference of two positive consecutive cubes in exactly one way: $217 = 6^3 + 1^3 = 9^3 - 8^3$. When written in binary, it is a non-repetitive Kaprekar number. It is also the sum of all the divisors of 100 and the number of week-month combinations in the Gregorian calendar (Monday the 1st, Tuesday the 2nd, Wednesday the 3rd, etc.).

== See also ==
- 217, the year
