= 303 (number) =

← 302	303	304 →
- List of numbers; Integers; ← 0 100 200 300 400 500 600 700 800 900 →
- Cardinal: three hundred three
- Ordinal: 303rd (three hundred third)
- Factorization: 3 × 101
- Divisors: 1, 3, 101, 303
- Greek numeral: ΤΓ´
- Roman numeral: CCCIII, ccciii
- Binary: 100101111_{2}
- Ternary: 102020_{3}
- Senary: 1223_{6}
- Octal: 457_{8}
- Duodecimal: 213_{12}
- Hexadecimal: 12F_{16}

303 (three hundred [and] three) is the natural number following 302 and preceding 304.

== In mathematics ==
- 303 is a semiprime since it is the product of two prime numbers: 3 × 101
- 303 is a lucky number.
- 303 is a member of the Toothpick sequence, in other words, 303 is the number of toothpicks in stage 24 of the toothpick structure.
- 303 is a palindromic number, and all of its divisors are palindromes.
- There are 303 compositions of 10 where they cannot be viewed as a stack.
- There are 303 non-isomorphic simple bipartite graphs with 8 vertices.
- In the American system, a centillion has a exponent of 303 (10^{303}), in other words, a centillion has 303 digits of zero.
- The ninth number k such that $k|(10^{k+1}-1)$. In other words, 303 is able to divide $(10^{303+1}-1)$.
