= 218 (number) =

← 217	218	219 →
- ← 210 211 212 213 214 215 216 217 218 219 →: List of numbers; Integers; ← 0 100 200 300 400 500 600 700 800 900 →
- Cardinal: two hundred eighteen
- Ordinal: 218th (two hundred eighteenth)
- Factorization: 2 × 109
- Divisors: 1, 2, 109, 218
- Greek numeral: ΣΙΗ´
- Roman numeral: CCXVIII, ccxviii
- Binary: 11011010_{2}
- Ternary: 22002_{3}
- Senary: 1002_{6}
- Octal: 332_{8}
- Duodecimal: 162_{12}
- Hexadecimal: DA_{16}

218 (two hundred [and] eighteen) is the natural number following 217 and preceding 219.

== In mathematics ==
- Mertens function (218) = 3, a record high.
- 218 is nontotient and also noncototient.
- 218 is the number of inequivalent ways to color the 12 edges of a cube using at most 2 colors, where two colorings are equivalent if they differ only by a rotation of the cube.
- There are 218 nondegenerate Boolean functions of 3 variables.
- The number of surface points on a 7^{3} cube.

== See also ==
- The years 218 and 218 BC
