= 211 (number) =

← 210	211	212 →
- ← 210 211 212 213 214 215 216 217 218 219 →: List of numbers; Integers; ← 0 100 200 300 400 500 600 700 800 900 →
- Cardinal: two hundred eleven
- Ordinal: 211th (two hundred eleventh)
- Factorization: prime
- Prime: 47th
- Divisors: 1, 211
- Greek numeral: ΣΙΑ´
- Roman numeral: CCXI, ccxi
- Binary: 11010011_{2}
- Ternary: 21211_{3}
- Senary: 551_{6}
- Octal: 323_{8}
- Duodecimal: 157_{12}
- Hexadecimal: D3_{16}

211 (two hundred [and] eleven) is the natural number following 210 and preceding 212. It is also a prime number.

== In mathematics ==
- 211 is the sum of three consecutive primes ($67+71+73$), a Chen prime, a centered decagonal prime, and a self prime.
- 211 is the smallest prime separated by 12 from the nearest primes (199 and 223). It is thus a balanced prime and an isolated prime.
- 211 is a repdigit in tetradecimal (111).
- 211 is the 47th prime number and therefore it is a super-prime.
- 211 is the fourth Euclid number, being $2\times 3\times 5\times 7 + 1$.
