= 215 (number) =

Natural number

← 214	215	216 →
- ← 210 211 212 213 214 215 216 217 218 219 →: List of numbers; Integers; ← 0 100 200 300 400 500 600 700 800 900 →
- Cardinal: two hundred fifteen
- Ordinal: 215th (two hundred fifteenth)
- Factorization: 5 × 43
- Divisors: 1, 5, 43, 215
- Greek numeral: ΣΙΕ´
- Roman numeral: CCXV, ccxv
- Binary: 11010111_{2}
- Ternary: 21222_{3}
- Senary: 555_{6}
- Octal: 327_{8}
- Duodecimal: 15B_{12}
- Hexadecimal: D7_{16}

215 (two hundred [and] fifteen) is the natural number following 214 and preceding 216.

== In mathematics ==
- 215 is a semiprime.
- .
- 215 is the coefficient of the quadratic term in the Maclaurin series for $x*(5 + 215*x - 1253*x^2 - 23*x^3)/((1 + 34*x + x^2)*(1 - 34*x + x^2))$.
- 215 is a vertically symmetric number on a calculator display (sequence A053701 in the OEIS).

== In other fields ==
- California Proposition 215 legalized Marijuana for medical use for the first time in the United States.
