= 219 (number) =

← 218	219	220 →
- ← 210 211 212 213 214 215 216 217 218 219 →: List of numbers; Integers; ← 0 100 200 300 400 500 600 700 800 900 →
- Cardinal: two hundred nineteen
- Ordinal: 219th (two hundred nineteenth)
- Factorization: 3 × 73
- Divisors: 1, 3, 73, 219
- Greek numeral: ΣΙΘ´
- Roman numeral: CCXIX, ccxix
- Binary: 11011011_{2}
- Ternary: 22010_{3}
- Senary: 1003_{6}
- Octal: 333_{8}
- Duodecimal: 163_{12}
- Hexadecimal: DB_{16}

219 (two hundred [and] nineteen) is the natural number following 218 and preceding 220.

== In mathematics ==
- 219 is a happy number.
- Mertens function (219) = 4, a record high.
- There are 219 partially ordered sets on four labeled elements.
- 219 is the smallest number that can be represented as a sum of four positive cubes in two different ways.
- There are 219 different space groups, discrete and full-dimensional sets of symmetries of three-dimensional space or of crystal structures.
