= 213 (number) =

← 212	213	214 →
- ← 210 211 212 213 214 215 216 217 218 219 →: List of numbers; Integers; ← 0 100 200 300 400 500 600 700 800 900 →
- Cardinal: two hundred thirteen
- Ordinal: 213th (two hundred thirteenth)
- Factorization: 3 × 71
- Divisors: 1, 3, 71, 213
- Greek numeral: ΣΙΓ´
- Roman numeral: CCXIII, ccxiii
- Binary: 11010101_{2}
- Ternary: 21220_{3}
- Senary: 553_{6}
- Octal: 325_{8}
- Duodecimal: 159_{12}
- Hexadecimal: D5_{16}

213 (two hundred [and] thirteen) is the number following 212 and preceding 214.

== In mathematics ==
213 and the other permutations of its digits are the only three-digit number whose digit sums and digit products are equal. It is a member of the quickly-growing Levine sequence, constructed from a triangle of numbers in which each row counts the copies of each value in the row below it.

As the product of the two distinct prime numbers 3 and 71, it is a semiprime, the first of a triple of three consecutive semiprimes 213, 214, and 215. Its square, 213^{2} = 45369, is one of only 15 known squares that can be represented as a sum of distinct factorials.

== See also ==
- 213 (disambiguation)
