= 214 (number) =

← 213	214	215 →
- ← 210 211 212 213 214 215 216 217 218 219 →: List of numbers; Integers; ← 0 100 200 300 400 500 600 700 800 900 →
- Cardinal: two hundred fourteen
- Ordinal: 214th (two hundred fourteenth)
- Factorization: 2 × 107
- Divisors: 1, 2, 107, 214
- Greek numeral: ΣΙΔ´
- Roman numeral: CCXIV, ccxiv
- Binary: 11010110_{2}
- Ternary: 21221_{3}
- Senary: 554_{6}
- Octal: 326_{8}
- Duodecimal: 15A_{12}
- Hexadecimal: D6_{16}

214 (two hundred [and] fourteen) is the natural number following 213 and preceding 215.

== In mathematics ==
- 214 is a semiprime, and a 37-gonal number (37-gonal number).
- 214!! − 1 is a 205-digit prime number.
- Number of regions into which a figure made up of a row of 5 adjacent congruent rectangles is divided upon drawing diagonals of all possible rectangles.
