= 501 (number) =

← 500	501	502 →
- List of numbers; Integers; ← 0 100 200 300 400 500 600 700 800 900 →
- Cardinal: five hundred one
- Ordinal: 501st (five hundred first)
- Factorization: 3 × 167
- Divisors: 1, 3, 167, 501
- Greek numeral: ΦΑ´
- Roman numeral: DI, di
- Binary: 111110101_{2}
- Ternary: 200120_{3}
- Senary: 2153_{6}
- Octal: 765_{8}
- Duodecimal: 359_{12}
- Hexadecimal: 1F5_{16}

501 (five hundred [and] one) is the natural number following 500 and preceding 502.

== In mathematics ==
501 is the sum of the first eighteen primes. 501 is palindromic in bases 9 (616_{9}) and 20 (151_{20}). There are 501 degree-8 polynomials with integer coefficients, all of whose roots are in the unit disk. There are 501 ways of partitioning the digits from 0 to 9 into two sets, each of which contains at least two digits, and 501 ways of partitioning a set of five elements into any number of ordered sequences. 501 is also a figurate number based on the 5-orthoplex or 5-dimensional cross polytope.

== Other uses ==
In the gematria of Eleazar of Worms, the Hebrew words "temunah" (image) and "parsuf 'adam" (human face) both had the numerological value of 501. Eleazar used this equivalence to argue that, in several Biblical passages, God appeared to His prophets in the form of a human face.

501 is commonly used to refer to people deported from Australia under section 501 of the 1958 Migration Act.
