= C213 =

C213 or variant, may refer to:

== Places ==
- Comeback Road (road C213), Tasmania, Australia; see List of road routes in Tasmania
- Natimuk–Frances Road (route C213), Victoria, Australia; see List of road routes in Victoria

== Vehicles ==
- Airborne Climax C2 13 hanglider
- New York City Subway car C213; see List of New York City Subway R-type contracts
- Siemens Inspiro Class C2.13, electric multiple unit train class
- SpaceX Crew Dragon C213 Grace, a SpaceX Dragon 2 space capsule for crewed spaceflight

== Other uses ==
- Camino Real strawberry (cultivar C213), a variety of strawberry

== See also ==
- 213 (disambiguation)
- C (disambiguation)
