= 301 (disambiguation) =

301 is a year, the year 301 CE.

301 may also refer to:

- 301 (number)
- 301 BC, a year
- 301, the name of a game of darts
- North American Area Code 301
- 301 Bavaria, an asteroid
- Peugeot 301, a car by Peugeot
- HTTP 301, a status code for Moved Permanently.
- 301, a posthumous album by jazz trio e.s.t.
- 301 Mission Street, the address of the Millennium tower in San Francisco

== See also ==
- 301st (disambiguation)
