= Reassembly =

Reassembly may refer to:

- Segmentation and Reassembly
- Reassembly (video game)

== See also ==
- Digit-reassembly number
