= 301st =

301st may refer to:

- 301st Air Refueling Squadron, an inactive United States Air Force (USAF) unit
- 301st Air Refueling Wing, an inactive unit of the United States Air Force
- 301st Airlift Squadron, United States Air Force Reserve squadron
- 301st Battalion, Tank Corps; inactive United States Army unit
- 301st Bombardment Squadron, inactive United States Air Force unit
- 301st Bombardment Squadron (Light), inactive United States Air Force unit
- 301st Fighter Squadron, a United States Air Force Reserve squadron
- 301st Fighter Wing, Air Reserve Component (ARC) of the United States Air Force
- 301st Infantry Battalion (Ready Reserve), one of the battalions of the Philippine Army Reserve Command
- 301st Infantry Brigade (United Kingdom) (301 Bde) was a formation of the British Army towards the end of World War II
- 301st Intelligence Squadron (301 IS), an intelligence unit located at Misawa AB, Japan
- 301st Military Intelligence Battalion (United States), located in Phoenix, Arizona
- 301st Operations Group, flying component of the 301st Fighter Wing
- 301st Rescue Squadron (301 RQS), part of the 920th Rescue Wing at Patrick Air Force Base, Florida

== See also ==
- 301 (number)
- 301 (disambiguation)
- 301, the year 301 (CCCI) of the Julian calendar
- 301 BC
