= Walter Knödel =

Austrian mathematician and computer scientist (1926–2018)

Walter Knödel (May 20, 1926 – October 19, 2018) was an Austrian mathematician and computer scientist. He was a computer science professor at the University of Stuttgart.

Born in Vienna, Walter Knödel studied mathematics and physics at the University of Vienna. Also in Vienna, Knödel received his PhD in 1948 for his work on number theory under the direction of Edmund Hlawka and got habilitated in 1953. In 1961, Walter Knödel became professor for mathematics at the University of Stuttgart.

Walter Knödel authored a number of books and scientific publications. He wrote the first German textbook on computer programming in 1961. He was the founding dean of the faculty for computer science at the University of Stuttgart and founding member of the German Computer Society the Gesellschaft für Informatik.

The Knödel numbers became named after Walter Knödel. He died in Stuttgart on October 19, 2018.
