= D. R. Kaprekar =

Indian recreational mathematician (1905–1986)

- Born: D.R. Kaprekar; 17 January 1905; Dahanu, Bombay Presidency, India
- Died: 4 July 1986 (aged 81); Nasik, Maharashtra, India
- Occupation: School teacher
- Known for: Contributions to recreational mathematics

Dattatreya Ramchandra Kaprekar (Marathi: दत्तात्रेय रामचंद्र कापरेकर; 17 January 1905 – 4 July 1986) was an Indian recreational mathematician who described several classes of natural numbers including the Kaprekar, Harshad and self numbers and discovered Kaprekar's constant, named after him. Despite having no formal postgraduate training and working as a schoolteacher, he published extensively and became well known in recreational mathematics circles.

== Education and work ==
Kaprekar received his secondary school education in Thane and studied at Fergusson College in Pune. In 1927, he won the Wrangler R. P. Paranjpye Mathematical Prize for an original piece of work in mathematics.

He attended the University of Mumbai, receiving his bachelor's degree in 1929. He was a schoolteacher at the government junior school in Devlali, Maharashtra, India for his entire career (1930-1962). Cycling from place to place, he also tutored private students with unconventional methods, cheerfully sitting by a river and "thinking of theorems". He published extensively, writing about such topics as recurring decimals, magic squares, and integers with special properties.

== Discoveries ==
Working largely alone, Kaprekar discovered a number of results in number theory and described various properties of numbers. In addition to the Kaprekar's constant and the Kaprekar numbers which were named after him, he also described self numbers or Devlali numbers, the harshad numbers and Demlo numbers. He also constructed certain types of magic squares related to the Copernicus magic square. Initially his ideas were not taken seriously by Indian mathematicians, and his results were published largely in low-level mathematics journals or privately published, but international fame arrived when Martin Gardner wrote about Kaprekar in his March 1975 column of Mathematical Games for Scientific American. A description of Kaprekar's constant, without mention of Kaprekar, appears in the children's book The I Hate Mathematics Book, by Marilyn Burns, published in 1975. Today his name is well-known and many other mathematicians have pursued the study of the properties he discovered.

=== Kaprekar's constant ===
In 1955, Kaprekar discovered an interesting property of the number 6174, which was subsequently named the Kaprekar constant. He showed that 6174 is reached in the end as one repeatedly subtracts the highest and lowest numbers that can be constructed from a set of four digits that are not all identical. Thus, starting with 1234, we have:

4321 − 1234 = 3087, then
8730 − 0378 = 8352, and
8532 − 2358 = 6174.

Repeating from this point onward leaves the same number (7641 − 1467 = 6174). In general, the operation converges in at most seven iterations.

A similar constant for three digits is 495. However, in base 10 a single such constant only exists for numbers of 3 or 4 digits; for other digit lengths or bases other than 10, the Kaprekar's routine algorithm described above may in general terminate in multiple different constants or repeated cycles, depending on the starting value. For example, for 2-digit numbers, the numbers eventually enter a loop, such as:

31 − 13 = 18
81 − 18 = 63
63 − 36 = 27
72 − 27 = 45
54 − 45 = 9
90 − 9 = 81
81 − 18 = 63

The loop in question is 63, 27, 45, 9, 81, and back to 63.

However, if in the above example 9 is not treated as a two-digit number (09), all two-digit numbers will end at 9. All differences between two-digit number digital swaps are multiples of 9, and thus will immediately enter the loop above at some stage. (Notably, both 495 and 6174 are multiples of 9.)

=== Kaprekar number ===
Another class of numbers Kaprekar described are Kaprekar numbers. A Kaprekar number is a positive integer with the property that if it is squared, then its representation can be partitioned into two positive integer parts whose sum is equal to the original number (e.g. 45, since 45^{2}=2025, and 20+25=45, also 9, 55, 99 etc.) However, note the restriction that the two numbers are positive; for example, 100 is not a Kaprekar number even though 100^{2}=10000, and 100+00 = 100. This operation, of taking the rightmost digits of a square, and adding it to the integer formed by the leftmost digits, is known as the Kaprekar operation.

Some examples of Kaprekar numbers in base 10, besides the numbers 9, 99, 999, ..., are (sequence A006886 in the OEIS):

Number	Square	Decomposition
703	703² = 494209	494+209 = 703
2728	2728² = 7441984	744+1984 = 2728

=== Devlali or self number ===
In 1963, Kaprekar defined the property which has come to be known as self numbers, as the integers that cannot be generated by taking some other number and adding its own digits to it. For example, 21 is not a self number, since it can be generated from 15: 15 + 1 + 5 = 21. But 20 is a self number, since it cannot be generated from any other integer. He also gave a test for verifying this property in any number. These are sometimes referred to as Devlali numbers (after the town where he lived); though this appears to have been his preferred designation, the term "self number" is more widespread. Sometimes these are also designated Colombian numbers after a later designation.

=== Harshad number ===
Kaprekar also described the harshad numbers which he named harshad, meaning "giving joy" (Sanskrit harsha, joy +da taddhita pratyaya, causative); these are defined by the property that they are divisible by the sum of their digits. Thus 12, which is divisible by 1 + 2 = 3, is a harshad number. These were later also called Niven numbers after 1977 lecture on these by the Canadian mathematician Ivan M. Niven. Numbers which are harshad in all bases (only 1, 2, 4, and 6) are called all-harshad numbers. Much work has been done on harshad numbers, and their distribution, frequency, etc. are a matter of considerable interest in number theory today.

=== Demlo number ===
Kaprekar also studied the Demlo numbers, name of which was derived from the name of a train station Demlo (now called Dombivili) 30 miles from Bombay on the then G. I. P. Railway where he had the idea of studying them. The best known of these are the Wonderful Demlo numbers 1, 121, 12321, 1234321, ..., which are the squares of the repunits 1, 11, 111,1111, ....

== See also ==
- Prahalad Chunnilal Vaidya
