= 301 (number) =

← 300	301	302 →
- List of numbers; Integers; ← 0 100 200 300 400 500 600 700 800 900 →
- Cardinal: three hundred one
- Ordinal: 301st (three hundred first)
- Factorization: 7 × 43
- Divisors: 1, 7, 43, 301
- Greek numeral: ΤΑ´
- Roman numeral: CCCI, ccci
- Binary: 100101101_{2}
- Ternary: 102011_{3}
- Senary: 1221_{6}
- Octal: 455_{8}
- Duodecimal: 211_{12}
- Hexadecimal: 12D_{16}

301 (three hundred [and] one) is the natural number following 300 and preceding 302.

== In mathematics ==
- 301 is an odd composite number with two prime factors, which are 7, and 43.
- 301 is a Stirling number of the second kind represented by {7/3} meaning that it is the number of ways to organize 7 objects into 3 non-empty sets.
- 301 is the sum of three consecutive primes 97, 101, and 103.
- 301 is a happy number, meaning that infinitely taking the sum of the squares of the digits will eventually result in 1.
- 301 is a lazy caterer number meaning that it is the maximum number of pieces made by cutting a circle with 24 cuts.
- 301 is the first, and smallest 6-hyperperfect number.
- 301 is the number of intersections of diagonals inside a regular dodecagon.
- 301 is a generalized pentagonal number.
- 301 is a hexadecagonal number.
- 301 is the number of 7-node simple graphs having clique number 4.
- The number 301*2^184+1 is the first, and smallest Proth prime with k = 301.
- 301 is a centered tridecagonal number.
- The matula tree of 301 is a binary tree.
- 301 is the nineteenth Blum integer.
