= Powerful number =

Numbers whose prime factors all divide the number more than once

$$\begin{align}144000&=2^7\times 3^2\times 5^3\\ &=2^3\times 2^4\times 3^2 \times 5^3\\ &=(2\times5)^3 \times (2^2\times 3)^2\end{align}$$

144000 is a powerful number.
Every exponent in its prime factorization is larger than 1.
It is the product of a square and a cube.

A powerful number is a positive integer m such that for every prime number p dividing m, p^{2} also divides m. Equivalently, a powerful number is the product of a square and a cube, that is, a number m of the form m = a^{2}b^{3}, where a and b are positive integers. Paul Erdős and George Szekeres studied such numbers and Solomon W. Golomb named such numbers powerful. Powerful numbers are also known as squarefull, square-full, or 2-full. (Not to be confused with the term squareful, which refers to numbers that are not square-free.)

The following is a list of all powerful numbers between 1 and 1000:

1, 4, 8, 9, 16, 25, 27, 32, 36, 49, 64, 72, 81, 100, 108, 121, 125, 128, 144, 169, 196, 200, 216, 225, 243, 256, 288, 289, 324, 343, 361, 392, 400, 432, 441, 484, 500, 512, 529, 576, 625, 648, 675, 676, 729, 784, 800, 841, 864, 900, 961, 968, 972, 1000, ... (sequence A001694 in the OEIS).

Powerful numbers up to 100 with prime factors colour-coded – 1 is a special case

== Equivalence of the two definitions ==
If m = a^{2}b^{3}, then every prime in the prime factorization of a appears in the prime factorization of m with an exponent of at least two, and every prime in the prime factorization of b appears in the prime factorization of m with an exponent of at least three; therefore, m is powerful.

In the other direction, suppose that m is powerful, with prime factorization

$$m = \prod p_i^{\alpha_i},$$

where each α_{i} ≥ 2. Define γ_{i} to be three if α_{i} is odd, and zero otherwise, and define β_{i} = α_{i} − γ_{i}. Then, all values β_{i} are nonnegative even integers, and all values γ_{i} are either zero or three, so

$$m = \left(\prod p_i^{\beta_i}\right)\left(\prod p_i^{\gamma_i}\right) = \left(\prod p_i^{\beta_i/2} \right)^2 \left( \prod p_i^{\gamma_i/3}\right)^3$$

supplies the desired representation of m as a product of a square and a cube.

Informally, given the prime factorization of m, take b to be the product of the prime factors of m that have an odd exponent (if there are none, then take b to be 1). Because m is powerful, each prime factor with an odd exponent has an exponent that is at least 3, so m/b^{3} is an integer. In addition, each prime factor of m/b^{3} has an even exponent, so m/b^{3} is a perfect square, so call this a^{2}; then m = a^{2}b^{3}. For example:

$$m = 21600 = 2^5 \times 3^3 \times 5^2 \, ,$$
$$b = 2 \times 3 = 6 \, ,$$
$$a = \sqrt{\frac{m}{b^3}} = \sqrt{2^2 \times 5^2} = 10 \, ,$$
$$m = a^2b^3 = 10^2 \times 6^3 \, .$$

The representation m = a^{2}b^{3} calculated in this way has the property that b is squarefree, and is uniquely defined by this property.

== Mathematical properties ==
The sum of the reciprocals of the powerful numbers converges. The value of this sum may be written in several other ways, including as the infinite product

$$\prod_p\left(1+\frac{1}{p(p-1)}\right)=\frac{\zeta(2)\zeta(3)}{\zeta(6)} = \frac{315}{2\pi^4}\zeta(3)=1.9435964368\ldots,$$

where p runs over all primes, ζ(s) denotes the Riemann zeta function, and ζ(3) is Apéry's constant. (sequence A082695 in the OEIS) More generally, the sum of the reciprocals of the sth powers of the powerful numbers (a Dirichlet series generating function) is equal to

$$\frac{\zeta(2s)\zeta(3s)}{\zeta(6s)}$$

whenever it converges.

Let k(x) denote the number of powerful numbers in the interval [1,x]. Then k(x) is proportional to the square root of x. More precisely,

$$cx^{1/2}-3x^{1/3}\le k(x) \le cx^{1/2}, c = \zeta(3/2)/\zeta(3) = 2.173 \ldots$$

(Golomb, 1970).

The two smallest consecutive powerful numbers are 8 and 9. Since Pell's equation $x^2-8y^2=1$ has infinitely many integral solutions, there are infinitely many pairs of consecutive powerful numbers (Golomb, 1970); more generally, one can find consecutive powerful numbers by solving a similar Pell equation $x^2-ny^2=\pm 1$ for any perfect cube n. However, one of the two powerful numbers in a pair formed in this way must be a square. According to Guy, Erdős has asked whether there are infinitely many pairs of consecutive powerful numbers such as $(23^3, 2^3 3^2 13^2)$ in which neither number in the pair is a square. Walker (1976) showed that there are indeed infinitely many such pairs by showing that $3^3 c^2 + 1 = 7^3 d^2$ has infinitely many solutions. Walker's solutions to this equation are generated, for any odd integer $k$, by considering the number

$$(2\sqrt{7}+3\sqrt{3})^{7k}=a\sqrt{7}+b\sqrt{3},$$

for integers $a$ divisible by 7 and $b$ divisible by 3, and constructing from $a$ and $b$ the consecutive powerful numbers $7a^2$ and $3b^2$ with $7a^2 = 1 + 3b^2$. The smallest consecutive pair in this family is generated for $k = 1$, $a = 2637362$, and $b = 4028637$ as

$$7\cdot 2637362^2 = 2^2\cdot 7^3\cdot 13^2\cdot 43^2\cdot 337^2=48689748233308$$

and

$$3\cdot 4028637^2 = 3^3\cdot 139^2\cdot 9661^2 = 48689748233307.$$

Unsolved problem in mathematics
Can three consecutive numbers be powerful?
More unsolved problems in mathematics

It is a conjecture of Erdős, Mollin, and Walsh that there are no three consecutive powerful numbers. If a triplet of consecutive powerful numbers exists, then its smallest term must be congruent to 7, 27, or 35 modulo 36.

If the abc conjecture is true, there are only a finite number of sets of three consecutive powerful numbers.

== Sums and differences of powerful numbers ==
Any odd number is a difference of two consecutive squares: (k + 1)^{2} = k^{2} + 2k + 1, so (k + 1)^{2} − k^{2} = 2k + 1. Similarly, any multiple of four is a difference of the squares of two numbers that differ by two: (k + 2)^{2} − k^{2} = 4k + 4. However, a singly even number, that is, a number divisible by two but not by four, cannot be expressed as a difference of squares. This motivates the question of determining which singly even numbers can be expressed as differences of powerful numbers. Golomb exhibited some representations of this type:

2 = 3^{3} − 5^{2}
10 = 13^{3} − 3^{7}
18 = 19^{2} − 7^{3} = 3^{5} − 15^{2}.

It had been conjectured that 6 cannot be so represented, and Golomb conjectured that there are infinitely many integers which cannot be represented as a difference between two powerful numbers. However, Narkiewicz showed that 6 can be so represented in infinitely many ways such as

6 = 5^{4}7^{3} − 463^{2},

and McDaniel showed that every integer has infinitely many such representations (McDaniel, 1982).

Erdős conjectured that every sufficiently large integer is a sum of at most three powerful numbers; this was proved by Roger Heath-Brown (1987).

== Generalization ==
More generally, we can consider the integers all of whose prime factors have exponents at least k. Such an integer is called a k-powerful number, k-ful number, or k-full number.

(2^{k+1} − 1)^{k}, 2^{k}(2^{k+1} − 1)^{k}, (2^{k+1} − 1)^{k+1}

are k-powerful numbers in an arithmetic progression. Moreover, if a_{1}, a_{2}, ..., a_{s} are k-powerful in an arithmetic progression with common difference d, then

a_{1}(a_{s} + d)^{k},

a_{2}(a_{s} + d)^{k}, ..., a_{s}(a_{s} + d)^{k}, (a_{s} + d)^{k+1}

are s + 1 k-powerful numbers in an arithmetic progression.

We have an identity involving k-powerful numbers:

a^{k}(a^{ℓ} + ... + 1)^{k} + a^{k + 1}(a^{ℓ} + ... + 1)^{k} + ... + a^{k + ℓ}(a^{ℓ} + ... + 1)^{k} = a^{k}(a^{ℓ} + ... +1)^{k+1}.

This gives infinitely many l+1-tuples of k-powerful numbers whose sum is also k-powerful. Nitaj shows there are infinitely many solutions of x + y = z in relatively prime 3-powerful numbers(Nitaj, 1995). Cohn constructs an infinite family of solutions of x + y = z in relatively prime non-cube 3-powerful numbers as follows: the triplet

X = 9712247684771506604963490444281, Y = 32295800804958334401937923416351, Z = 27474621855216870941749052236511

is a solution of the equation 32X^{3} + 49Y^{3} = 81Z^{3}. We can construct another solution by setting X′ = X(49Y^{3} + 81Z^{3}), Y′ = −Y(32X^{3} + 81Z^{3}), Z′ = Z(32X^{3} − 49Y^{3}) and omitting the common divisor.

== See also ==
- Achilles number
- Highly powerful number
