= Highly powerful number =

Positive integers that have a property about their divisors

In elementary number theory, a highly powerful number is a positive integer that satisfies a property introduced by the Indo-Canadian mathematician Mathukumalli V. Subbarao. The set of highly powerful numbers is a proper subset of the set of powerful numbers.

Define prodex(1) = 1. Let $n$ be a positive integer, such that $n = \prod_{i=1}^k p_i^{e_{p_i}(n)}$, where $p_1, \ldots , p_k$ are $k$ distinct primes in increasing order and $e_{p_i}(n)$ is a positive integer for $i = 1, \ldots ,k$. Define $\operatorname{prodex}(n) = \prod_{i=1}^k e_{p_i}(n)$. (sequence A005361 in the OEIS) The positive integer $n$ is defined to be a highly powerful number if and only if, for every positive integer $m,\, 1 \le m < n$ implies that $\operatorname{prodex}(m) < \operatorname{prodex}(n).$

The first 25 highly powerful numbers are: 1, 4, 8, 16, 32, 64, 128, 144, 216, 288, 432, 864, 1296, 1728, 2592, 3456, 5184, 7776, 10368, 15552, 20736, 31104, 41472, 62208, 86400. (sequence A005934 in the OEIS)
