= Totient summatory function =

Arithmetic function

In number theory, the totient summatory function $\Phi(n)$ is a summatory function of Euler's totient function defined by

$$\Phi(n) := \sum_{k=1}^n \varphi(k), \quad n\in \mathbb{N}.$$

It is the number of ordered pairs of coprime integers (p,q), where 1 ≤ p ≤ q ≤ n.

The first few values are 0, 1, 2, 4, 6, 10, 12, 18, 22, 28, 32, ... (sequence A002088 in the OEIS). Values for powers of 10 are 1, 32, 3044, 304192, 30397486, 3039650754, ... (sequence A064018 in the OEIS).

== Properties ==
The following identity holds for all real $n \geq 0$:

$$\sum_{d=1}^n \Phi\left(\frac{n}{d}\right)=\frac{1}{2}\lfloor n \rfloor \lfloor n+1 \rfloor$$.

This gives an implicit recurrence for the totient summatory function.

Applying Möbius inversion to the totient function or the above identity yields

$$\Phi(n) = \sum_{k=1}^n k\sum _{d\mid k} \frac {\mu (d)}{d} = \frac{1}{2} \sum _{k=1}^n \mu(k) \left\lfloor \frac {n}{k} \right\rfloor \left(1 + \left\lfloor \frac {n}{k} \right\rfloor \right),$$

where $\mu(n)$ is the Möbius function. Then it can be shown that Φ(n) has the asymptotic expansion

$$\Phi(n) \sim \frac{1}{2\zeta(2)}n^{2}+O\left( n\log n \right ) = \frac{3}{\pi^2}n^2+O\left( n\log n \right),$$

where ζ(2) is the Riemann zeta function evaluated at 2, which is $\frac{\pi^2}{6}$.

== Reciprocal totient summatory function ==
The summatory function of the reciprocal of the totient is

$$S(n) := \sum _{k=1}^{n}{\frac {1}{\varphi (k)}}.$$

Edmund Landau showed in 1900 that this function has the asymptotic behavior

$$S(n) \sim A (\gamma+\log n)+ B +O\left(\frac{\log n} n\right),$$

where γ is the Euler–Mascheroni constant,

$$A = \sum_{k=1}^\infty \frac{\mu (k)^2}{k \varphi(k)} = \frac{\zeta(2)\zeta(3)}{\zeta(6)} = \prod_{p\in\mathbb{P}} \left(1+\frac 1 {p(p-1)} \right),$$

and

$$B = \sum_{k=1}^{\infty} \frac{\mu (k)^2\log k}{k \,\varphi(k)} = A \, \prod _{p\in\mathbb{P}}\left(\frac {\log p}{p^2-p+1}\right).$$

The constant A = 1.943596... is sometimes known as Landau's totient constant. The sum $\textstyle \sum _{k=1}^\infty 1 / (k \; \varphi (k))$ converges to

$$\sum _{k=1}^\infty \frac 1 {k\varphi (k)} = \zeta(2) \prod_{p\in\mathbb{P}} \left(1 + \frac 1 {p^2(p-1)}\right) =2.20386\ldots.$$

In this case, the product over the primes in the right side is a constant known as the totient summatory constant, and its value is

$$\prod_{p\in\mathbb{P}} \left(1+\frac 1 {p^2(p-1)} \right) = 1.339784\ldots.$$

== See also ==
- Arithmetic function
