= Self number =

Type of natural number

In number theory, a self number in a given number base $b$ is a natural number that cannot be written as the sum of any other natural number $n$ and the individual digits of $n$. 20 is a self number (in base 10), because no such combination can be found (all $n < 15$ give a result less than 20; all other $n$ give a result greater than 20). 21 is not, because it can be written as 15 + 1 + 5 using n = 15. These numbers were first described in 1959 by the Indian mathematician D. R. Kaprekar.

== Definition and properties ==
Let $n$ be a natural number. We define the $b$-self function $F_b : \mathbb{N} \rightarrow \mathbb{N}$ for base $b > 1$ to be the following:

$$F_{b}(n) = n + \sum_{i=0}^{k - 1} d_i.$$

where $k = \lfloor \log_{b}{n} \rfloor + 1$ is the number of digits in the number in base $b$, and

$$d_i = \frac{n \bmod{b^{i+1}} - n \bmod b^i}{b^i}$$

is the value of each digit of the number. A natural number $n$ is a $b$-self number if the preimage of $n$ for $F_b$ is the empty set.

In general, for even bases, all odd numbers below the base number are self numbers, since any number below such an odd number would have to also be a 1-digit number which when added to its digit would result in an even number. For odd bases, all odd numbers are self numbers.

The set of self numbers in a given base $b$ is infinite and has a positive asymptotic density: when $b$ is odd, this density is 1/2.

== Self numbers in specific bases ==
For base 2 self numbers, see OEIS: A010061. (written in base 10)

The first few base 10 self numbers are:

1, 3, 5, 7, 9, 20, 31, 42, 53, 64, 75, 86, 97, 108, 110, 121, 132, 143, 154, 165, 176, 187, 198, 209, 211, 222, 233, 244, 255, 266, 277, 288, 299, 310, 312, 323, 334, 345, 356, 367, 378, 389, 400, 411, 413, 424, 435, 446, 457, 468, 479, 490, ... (sequence A003052 in the OEIS)

== Self primes ==
A self prime is a self number that is prime.

The first few self primes in base 10 are

3, 5, 7, 31, 53, 97, 211, 233, 277, 367, 389, 457, 479, 547, 569, 613, 659, 727, 839, 883, 929, 1021, 1087, 1109, 1223, 1289, 1447, 1559, 1627, 1693, 1783, 1873, ... (sequence A006378 in the OEIS)
