= Untouchable number =

Number that cannot be written as an aliquot sum

In mathematics, an untouchable number is a positive integer that cannot be expressed as the sum of all the proper divisors of any positive integer. That is, these numbers are not in the image of the aliquot sum function. Their study goes back at least to Abu Mansur al-Baghdadi (circa 1000 AD), who observed that both 2 and 5 are untouchable.

== Examples ==
If we draw an arrow pointing from each positive integer to the sum of all its proper divisors, there will be no arrow pointing to untouchable numbers like 2 and 5.

- The number 4 is not untouchable, as it is equal to the sum of the proper divisors of 9: 1 + 3 = 4.
- The number 5 is untouchable, as it is not the sum of the proper divisors of any positive integer: 5 = 1 + 4 is the only way to write 5 as the sum of distinct positive integers including 1, but if 4 divides a number, 2 does also, so 1 + 4 cannot be the sum of all of any number's proper divisors (since the list of factors would have to contain both 4 and 2).
- The number 6 is not untouchable, as it is equal to the sum of the proper divisors of 6 itself: 1 + 2 + 3 = 6.

The first few untouchable numbers are

2, 5, 52, 88, 96, 120, 124, 146, 162, 188, 206, 210, 216, 238, 246, 248, 262, 268, 276, 288, 290, 292, 304, 306, 322, 324, 326, 336, 342, 372, 406, 408, 426, 430, 448, 472, 474, 498, ... (sequence A005114 in the OEIS).

== Properties ==
Unsolved problem in mathematics
Are there any odd untouchable numbers other than 5?
More unsolved problems in mathematics

The number 5 is believed to be the only odd untouchable number, but this has not been proven. It would follow from a slightly stronger version of the Goldbach conjecture, since the sum of the proper divisors of pq (with p, q distinct primes) is 1 + p + q. Thus, if a number n can be written as a sum of two distinct primes, then n + 1 is not an untouchable number. It is expected that every even number larger than 6 is a sum of two distinct primes, so probably no odd number larger than 7 is an untouchable number, and $1=\sigma(2)-2$, $3=\sigma(4)-4$, $7=\sigma(8)-8$, so only 5 can be an odd untouchable number. Thus it appears that besides 2 and 5, all untouchable numbers are composite numbers (since except 2, all even numbers are composite). No perfect number is untouchable, since, at the very least, it can be expressed as the sum of its own proper divisors. Similarly, none of the amicable numbers or sociable numbers are untouchable. Also, none of the Mersenne numbers are untouchable, since M_{n} = 2^{n} − 1 is equal to the sum of the proper divisors of 2^{n}.

No untouchable number is 1 more than a prime number, since if p is prime, then the sum of the proper divisors of p^{2} is p + 1. Also, no untouchable number is 3 more than a prime number, except 5, since if p is an odd prime then the sum of the proper divisors of 2p is p + 3.

== Infinitude ==
There are infinitely many untouchable numbers, a fact that was proven by Paul Erdős. According to Chen and Zhao, their natural density is at least d > 0.06.

== See also ==
- Aliquot sequence
- Nontotient
- Noncototient
- Weird number
