= Knödel number =

Composite number with special property

In number theory, an n-Knödel number for a given positive integer n is a composite number m with the property that each i < m coprime to m satisfies $i^{m - n} \equiv 1 \pmod{m}$. The concept is named after Walter Knödel.

The set of all n-Knödel numbers is denoted K_{n}. The special case K_{1} is the Carmichael numbers. There are infinitely many n-Knödel numbers for a given n.

Due to Euler's theorem every composite number m is an n-Knödel number for $n = m-\varphi(m)$ where $\varphi$ is Euler's totient function.

A 1-Knödel number is commonly known as a Carmichael number, and a 3-Knödel number is also known as a D-number.

== Examples ==
n	K_{n}	
1	{561, 1105, 1729, 2465, 2821, 6601, ... }	(sequence A002997 in the OEIS)
2	{4, 6, 8, 10, 12, 14, 22, 24, 26, ... }	(sequence A050990 in the OEIS)
3	{9, 15, 21, 33, 39, 51, 57, 63, 69, ... }	(sequence A033553 in the OEIS)
4	{6, 8, 12, 16, 20, 24, 28, 40, 44, ... }	(sequence A050992 in the OEIS)

== Literature ==
- Makowski, A (1963). Generalization of Morrow's D-Numbers. p. 71.
- Ribenboim, Paulo (1989). The New Book of Prime Number Records. New York: Springer-Verlag. p. 101. ISBN 978-0-387-94457-9.
