= 213 (disambiguation) =

213 is a year of the Julian calendar.

213 may also refer to:

- 213 (number), a natural number
- 213 BC, a year of the pre-Julian Roman calendar
- 213 Lilaea, a Main belt asteroid
- 213 series, a type of train used by Japan National Railways
- Area code 213, a telephone area code for downtown Los Angeles and environs
- Two:Thirteen, a 2009 suspense thriller film
- 213, the apartment number of American serial killer Jeffrey Dahmer
- The international calling code for Algeria

Music

- 213 (group), a hip hop group consisting of Snoop Dogg, Warren G & Nate Dogg
- "213", a song by Slayer from Divine Intervention
- "213 (Maritime.epsosis)", a song by Squarepusher from Conumber E:P

Military units

- 213 Coastal Division, an Infantry Division of the Italian Army during World War II
- 213th Battalion (American Legion), CEF, a unit in the Canadian Expeditionary Force during World War I
- 213th Area Support Group (United States), a unit of the Pennsylvania Army National Guard

== See also ==
- List of highways numbered 213
- 2.13.61, a record company founded by Henry Rollins
