= Digit-reassembly number =

Number that is the sum of permutations of sub-samples of their own digits

In mathematics, the Digit-reassembly numbers, or Osiris numbers, are numbers that are equal to the sum of permutations of sub-samples of their own digits (compare the dismemberment and reconstruction of the god Osiris in Egyptian mythology). For example, 132 = 12 + 21 + 13 + 31 + 23 + 32.

== Osiris numbers in base ten ==
In base ten, the smallest Osiris numbers are these, with a number-length of three digits and digit-span of two for the permutated sums:

132 = 12 + 21 + 13 + 31 + 23 + 32
264 = 24 + 42 + 26 + 62 + 46 + 64
396 = 36 + 63 + 39 + 93 + 69 + 96

Note that all are multiples of 132. A larger Osiris number in base ten is this, with a number-length of five digits and digit-span of three for the permutated sums:

35964 = 345 + 354 + 435 + 453 + 534 + 543 + 346 + 364 + 436 + 463 + 634 + 643 + 349 + 394 + 439 + 493 + 934 + 943 + 356 + 365 + 536 + 563 + 635 + 653 + 359 + 395 + 539 + 593 + 935 + 953 + 369 + 396 + 639 + 693 + 936 + 963 + 456 + 465 + 546 + 564 + 645 + 654 + 459 + 495 + 549 + 594 + 945 + 954 + 469 + 496 + 649 + 694 + 946 + 964 + 569 + 596 + 659 + 695 + 956 + 965

== Maximal Osiris numbers ==
If zero is treated as a full digit in all positions, then 207 in base ten is a maximal Osiris number, being equal to the sum of all possible distinct numbers formed from permutated sub-samples of its digits:

207 = 2 + 0 + 7 + 20 + 02 + 27 + 72 + 07 + 70

In other bases, maximal Osiris numbers exist that do not contain zeros. For example:

253_{9} = 2 + 3 + 5 + 23 + 32 + 25 + 52 + 35 + 53 (base = 9)

210 = 2 + 3 + 5 + 21 + 29 + 23 + 47 + 32 + 48 (base = 10)

276_{13} = 2 + 6 + 7 + 26 + 62 + 27 + 72 + 67 + 76 (b=13)

435 = 2 + 6 + 7 + 32 + 80 + 33 + 93 + 85 + 97 (b=10)

DF53_{17} = 3 + 5 + D + F + 35 + 53 + 3D + D3 + 3F + F3 + 5D + D5 + 5F + F5 + DF + FD + 35D + 3D5 + 53D + 5D3 + D35 + D53 + 35F + 3F5 + 53F + 5F3 + F35 + F53 + 3DF + 3FD + D3F + DF3 + F3D + FD3 + 5DF + 5FD + D5F + DF5 + F5D + FD5 (b=17)

68292 = 3 + 5 + 13 + 15 + 56 + 88 + 64 + 224 + 66 + 258 + 98 + 226 + 100 + 260 + 236 + 268 + 965 + 1093 + 1509 + 1669 + 3813 + 3845 + 967 + 1127 + 1511 + 1703 + 4391 + 4423 + 1103 + 1135 + 3823 + 4015 + 4399 + 4559 + 1681 + 1713 + 3857 + 4017 + 4433 + 4561 (b=10)

== Multi-minimal Osiris numbers ==
Using the same terminology, 132, 264 and 396 are minimal Osiris numbers, being equal to the sums of all numbers formed from permutated samples of only two of their digits. 35964 is also minimal, being the sum of samples of three digits, but 34658 is a multi-minimal Osiris number, being equal to the sums of all numbers formed from permutated samples of one or three of its digits:

34658 = 3 + 4 + 5 + 6 + 8 + 345 + 354 + 435 + 453 + 534 + 543 + 346 + 364 + 436 + 463 + 634 + 643 + 348 + 384 + 438 + 483 + 834 + 843 + 356 + 365 + 536 + 563 + 635 + 653 + 358 + 385 + 538 + 583 + 835 + 853 + 368 + 386 + 638 + 683 + 836 + 863 + 456 + 465 + 546 + 564 + 645 + 654 + 458 + 485 + 548 + 584 + 845 + 854 + 468 + 486 + 648 + 684 + 846 + 864 + 568 + 586 + 658 + 685 + 856 + 865

30659 and 38657 are similarly multi-minimal, using permutated samples of one and three of their digits.

== Tests for Osiris numbers ==
Testing for Osiris numbers is simplified when one notes that, for example, each digit of 132 occurs twice in the ones and tens position of the sums:

132 = 12 + 21 + 13 + 31 + 23 + 32 = 2x11 + 2x22 + 2x33 = 22 + 44 + 66

The test can be further simplified:

132 = 2 x (11 + 22 + 33) = 2 x (1 + 2 + 3) x 11 = 2 x 6 x 11

If only numbers with unique non-zero digits are considered, a three-digit number in base ten can have a digit-sum ranging from 6 = 1+2+3 to 24 = 7+8+9. If these potential digit-sums are used in the formula 2 x digit-sum x 11, the digit-sum of the result will determine whether or not the result is an Osiris number.

1. 2 x 6 x 11 = 132.
2. Digit-sum (132) = 1 + 2 + 3 = 6.
3. Therefore 132 is an Osiris number.

1. 2 x 7 x 11 = 154.
2. Digit-sum (154) = 1 + 5 + 4 = 10.
3. Therefore 154 is not an Osiris number.

In 35964, each digit occurs 12 times in the ones, tens and hundreds position of the sums:

35964 = 12x333 + 12x444 + 12x555 + 12x666 + 12x999 = 3996 + 5328 + 6660 + 7992 + 11988

35964 = 12 x (333 + 444 + 555 + 666 + 999) = 12 x (3 + 4 + 5 + 6 + 9) x 111 = 12 x 27 x 111

The test for further five-digit Osiris numbers of the same form (sampling three digits) will use potential digit-sums between 15 = 1+2+3+4+5 and 35 = 5+6+7+8+9. When this range of digit-sums is tested, only 35964 returns the same digit-sum as that used in the formula. These simplified tests considerably reduce the task of finding large Osiris numbers in a particular base. For example, to test by brute force whether permutated six-digit samples of n = 332,639,667,360 are equal to n would involve summing 665,280 numbers, where 665,280 = 12 x 11 x 10 x 9 x 8 x 7 = 12! / 6!. However, because each digit of n occurs 55440 times in each of the six possible positions in the samples, the test is reduced to this:

1. digit-sum (332,639,667,360) = 3+3+2+6+3+9+6+6+7+3+6+0 = 54
2. 55440 x 54 x 111,111 = 332,639,667,360
3. Therefore 332,639,667,360 is an Osiris number.

== See also ==
- Digit sum
