= Centered decagonal number =

Centered figurate number that represents a decagon with a dot in the center

A centered decagonal number is a centered figurate number that represents a decagon with a dot in the center and all other dots surrounding the center dot in successive decagonal layers. The centered decagonal number for n is given by the formula

$$5n^2-5n+1 \,$$

Thus, the first few centered decagonal numbers are

1, 11, 31, 61, 101, 151, 211, 281, 361, 451, 551, 661, 781, 911, 1051, ... (sequence A062786 in the OEIS)

Like any other centered k-gonal number, the nth centered decagonal number can be reckoned by multiplying the (n − 1)th triangular number by k, 10 in this case, then adding 1. As a consequence of performing the calculation in base 10, the centered decagonal numbers can be obtained by simply adding a 1 to the right of each triangular number. Therefore, all centered decagonal numbers are odd and in base 10 always end in 1.

Another consequence of this relation to triangular numbers is the simple recurrence relation for centered decagonal numbers:

$$CD_{n} = CD_{n-1}+10n ,$$

where

$$CD_0 = 1 .$$

== Relation to other sequences ==
- N is a Centered decagonal number iff 20N + 5 is a Square number.

== Generating Function ==
The generating function of the centered decagonal number is $\frac{x*(1+8x+x^2)}{(1-x)^3}$

== Continued fraction forms ==
$\sqrt{5CD_{n}}$ has the simple continued fraction [5n-3;{2,2n-2,2,10n-6}].

== See also ==
- [ordinary] decagonal number
