= Smith number =

Type of composite integer

- Named after: Harold Smith (brother-in-law of Albert Wilansky)
- Author of publication: Albert Wilansky
- Total no. of terms: infinity
- First terms: 4, 22, 27, 58, 85, 94, 121
- OEIS index: A006753

In number theory, a Smith number is a composite number for which, in a given number base, the sum of its digits is equal to the sum of the digits in its prime factorization in the same base. In the case of numbers that are not square-free, the factorization is written without exponents, writing the repeated factor as many times as needed.

Smith numbers were named by Albert Wilansky of Lehigh University, as he noticed the property in the phone number (493-7775) of his brother-in-law Harold Smith:

4937775 = 3 · 5 · 5 · 65837

while

4 + 9 + 3 + 7 + 7 + 7 + 5 = 3 + 5 + 5 + (6 + 5 + 8 + 3 + 7)

in base 10.

== Mathematical definition ==
Let $n$ be a natural number. For base $b > 1$, let the function $F_b(n)$ be the digit sum of $n$ in base $b$. A natural number $n$ with prime factorization
$$n = \prod_{\stackrel{p \mid n,}{p\text{ prime}}} p^{v_p(n)}$$
is a Smith number if
$$F_b(n) = \sum_{{\stackrel{p \mid n,}{p\text{ prime}}}} v_p(n) F_b(p).$$
Here the exponent $v_p(n)$ is the multiplicity of $p$ as a prime factor of $n$ (also known as the p-adic valuation of $n$).

For example, in base 10, 378 = 2^{1} · 3^{3} · 7^{1} is a Smith number since 3 + 7 + 8 = 2 · 1 + 3 · 3 + 7 · 1, and 22 = 2^{1} · 11^{1} is a Smith number, because 2 + 2 = 2 · 1 + (1 + 1) · 1.

The first few Smith numbers in base 10 are

4, 22, 27, 58, 85, 94, 121, 166, 202, 265, 274, 319, 346, 355, 378, 382, 391, 438, 454, 483, 517, 526, 535, 562, 576, 588, 627, 634, 636, 645, 648, 654, 663, 666, 690, 706, 728, 729, 762, 778, 825, 852, 861, 895, 913, 915, 922, 958, 985. (sequence A006753 in the OEIS)

== Properties ==
W.L. McDaniel in 1987 proved that there are infinitely many Smith numbers. The number of Smith numbers in base 10 below 10^{n} for n = 1, 2, ... is given by

1, 6, 49, 376, 3294, 29928, 278411, 2632758, 25154060, 241882509, ... (sequence A104170 in the OEIS).

Two consecutive Smith numbers (for example, 728 and 729, or 2964 and 2965) are called Smith brothers. It is not known how many Smith brothers there are. The starting elements of the smallest Smith n-tuple (meaning n consecutive Smith numbers) in base 10 for n = 1, 2, ... are

4, 728, 73615, 4463535, 15966114, 2050918644, 164736913905, ... (sequence A059754 in the OEIS).

Smith numbers can be constructed from factored repunits. As of 2010, the largest known Smith number in base 10 is

9 × R_{1031} × (10^{4594} + 3×10^{2297} + 1)^{1476} ×10^{3913210}

where R_{1031} is the base 10 repunit (10^{1031} − 1)/9.

== See also ==
- Equidigital number
