= Nontotient =

Number that is not in the range of Euler's totient function

In number theory, a nontotient is a positive integer n which is not a totient number: it is not in the image of Euler's totient function φ, that is, the equation φ(x) = n has no solution x. In other words, n is a nontotient if there is no integer x that has exactly n coprimes below it. All odd numbers are nontotients, except 1, since it has the solutions x = 1 and x = 2. The first few even nontotients are this sequence:

14, 26, 34, 38, 50, 62, 68, 74, 76, 86, 90, 94, 98, 114, 118, 122, 124, 134, 142, 146, 152, 154, 158, 170, 174, 182, 186, 188, 194, 202, 206, 214, 218, 230, 234, 236, 242, 244, 246, 248, 254, 258, 266, 274, 278, 284, 286, 290, 298, ... (sequence A005277 in the OEIS)

The least value of k such that the totient of k is n are (0 if no such k exists) are this sequence:

1, 3, 0, 5, 0, 7, 0, 15, 0, 11, 0, 13, 0, 0, 0, 17, 0, 19, 0, 25, 0, 23, 0, 35, 0, 0, 0, 29, 0, 31, 0, 51, 0, 0, 0, 37, 0, 0, 0, 41, 0, 43, 0, 69, 0, 47, 0, 65, 0, 0, 0, 53, 0, 81, 0, 87, 0, 59, 0, 61, 0, 0, 0, 85, 0, 67, 0, 0, 0, 71, 0, 73, ... (sequence A049283 in the OEIS)

The greatest value of k such that the totient of k is n are (0 if no such k exists) are this sequence:

2, 6, 0, 12, 0, 18, 0, 30, 0, 22, 0, 42, 0, 0, 0, 60, 0, 54, 0, 66, 0, 46, 0, 90, 0, 0, 0, 58, 0, 62, 0, 120, 0, 0, 0, 126, 0, 0, 0, 150, 0, 98, 0, 138, 0, 94, 0, 210, 0, 0, 0, 106, 0, 162, 0, 174, 0, 118, 0, 198, 0, 0, 0, 240, 0, 134, 0, 0, 0, 142, 0, 270, ... (sequence A057635 in the OEIS)

The number of ks such that φ(k) = n are (start with n = 0) are this sequence:

0, 2, 3, 0, 4, 0, 4, 0, 5, 0, 2, 0, 6, 0, 0, 0, 6, 0, 4, 0, 5, 0, 2, 0, 10, 0, 0, 0, 2, 0, 2, 0, 7, 0, 0, 0, 8, 0, 0, 0, 9, 0, 4, 0, 3, 0, 2, 0, 11, 0, 0, 0, 2, 0, 2, 0, 3, 0, 2, 0, 9, 0, 0, 0, 8, 0, 2, 0, 0, 0, 2, 0, 17, ... (sequence A014197 in the OEIS)

Carmichael's conjecture is that there are no 1s in this sequence.

An even nontotient may be one more than a prime number, but never one less, since all numbers below a prime number are, by definition, coprime to it. To put it algebraically, for p prime: φ(p) = p − 1. Also, a pronic number n(n − 1) is certainly not a nontotient if n is prime since φ(p^{2}) = p(p − 1).

If a natural number n is a totient, n · 2^{k} is a totient for all natural numbers k.

There are infinitely many even nontotient numbers: indeed, there are infinitely many distinct primes p (such as 78557 and 271129, see Sierpinski number) such that all numbers of the form 2^{a}p are nontotient, and every odd number has an even multiple which is a nontotient.

n	numbers k such that φ(k) = n	n	numbers k such that φ(k) = n	n	numbers k such that φ(k) = n	n	numbers k such that φ(k) = n
1	1, 2	37		73		109	
2	3, 4, 6	38		74		110	121, 242
3		39		75		111	
4	5, 8, 10, 12	40	41, 55, 75, 82, 88, 100, 110, 132, 150	76		112	113, 145, 226, 232, 290, 348
5		41		77		113	
6	7, 9, 14, 18	42	43, 49, 86, 98	78	79, 158	114	
7		43		79		115	
8	15, 16, 20, 24, 30	44	69, 92, 138	80	123, 164, 165, 176, 200, 220, 246, 264, 300, 330	116	177, 236, 354
9		45		81		117	
10	11, 22	46	47, 94	82	83, 166	118	
11		47		83		119	
12	13, 21, 26, 28, 36, 42	48	65, 104, 105, 112, 130, 140, 144, 156, 168, 180, 210	84	129, 147, 172, 196, 258, 294	120	143, 155, 175, 183, 225, 231, 244, 248, 286, 308, 310, 350, 366, 372, 396, 450, 462
13		49		85		121	
14		50		86		122	
15		51		87		123	
16	17, 32, 34, 40, 48, 60	52	53, 106	88	89, 115, 178, 184, 230, 276	124	
17		53		89		125	
18	19, 27, 38, 54	54	81, 162	90		126	127, 254
19		55		91		127	
20	25, 33, 44, 50, 66	56	87, 116, 174	92	141, 188, 282	128	255, 256, 272, 320, 340, 384, 408, 480, 510
21		57		93		129	
22	23, 46	58	59, 118	94		130	131, 262
23		59		95		131	
24	35, 39, 45, 52, 56, 70, 72, 78, 84, 90	60	61, 77, 93, 99, 122, 124, 154, 186, 198	96	97, 119, 153, 194, 195, 208, 224, 238, 260, 280, 288, 306, 312, 336, 360, 390, 420	132	161, 201, 207, 268, 322, 402, 414
25		61		97		133	
26		62		98		134	
27		63		99		135	
28	29, 58	64	85, 128, 136, 160, 170, 192, 204, 240	100	101, 125, 202, 250	136	137, 274
29		65		101		137	
30	31, 62	66	67, 134	102	103, 206	138	139, 278
31		67		103		139	
32	51, 64, 68, 80, 96, 102, 120	68		104	159, 212, 318	140	213, 284, 426
33		69		105		141	
34		70	71, 142	106	107, 214	142	
35		71		107		143	
36	37, 57, 63, 74, 76, 108, 114, 126	72	73, 91, 95, 111, 117, 135, 146, 148, 152, 182, 190, 216, 222, 228, 234, 252, 270	108	109, 133, 171, 189, 218, 266, 324, 342, 378	144	185, 219, 273, 285, 292, 296, 304, 315, 364, 370, 380, 432, 438, 444, 456, 468, 504, 540, 546, 570, 630
