= Idoneal number =

Mathematical concept in prime numbers

In mathematics, Euler's idoneal numbers (also called suitable numbers or convenient numbers) are the positive integers D such that any integer expressible in only one way as x^{2} ± Dy^{2} (where x^{2} is relatively prime to Dy^{2}) is a prime power or twice a prime power. In particular, a number that has two distinct representations as a sum of two squares is composite. Every idoneal number generates a set containing infinitely many primes and missing infinitely many other primes.

== Definition ==
A positive integer n is idoneal if and only if it cannot be written as ab + bc + ac for distinct positive integers a, b, and c.

It is sufficient to consider the set {n + k^{2} | 3 . k^{2} ≤ n ∧ gcd(n, k) = 1}; if all these numbers are of the form p, p^{2}, 2 · p or 2^{s} for some integer s, where p is a prime, then n is idoneal.

== Conjecturally complete listing ==
Unsolved problem in mathematics:
Are there 65, 66 or 67 idoneal numbers?
(more unsolved problems in mathematics)

The 65 idoneal numbers found by Leonhard Euler and Carl Friedrich Gauss and conjectured to be the only such numbers are

1, 2, 3, 4, 5, 6, 7, 8, 9, 10, 12, 13, 15, 16, 18, 21, 22, 24, 25, 28, 30, 33, 37, 40, 42, 45, 48, 57, 58, 60, 70, 72, 78, 85, 88, 93, 102, 105, 112, 120, 130, 133, 165, 168, 177, 190, 210, 232, 240, 253, 273, 280, 312, 330, 345, 357, 385, 408, 462, 520, 760, 840, 1320, 1365, and 1848 (sequence A000926 in the OEIS).

Results of Peter J. Weinberger from 1973 imply that at most two other idoneal numbers exist, and that the list above is complete if the generalized Riemann hypothesis holds (some sources incorrectly claim that Weinberger's results imply that there is at most one other idoneal number).

== See also ==
- List of unsolved problems in mathematics
