= 300 (number) =

← 299	300	301 →
- List of numbers; Integers; ← 0 100 200 300 400 500 600 700 800 900 →
- Cardinal: three hundred
- Ordinal: 300th (three hundredth)
- Factorization: 2^{2} × 3 × 5^{2}
- Greek numeral: Τ´
- Roman numeral: CCC, ccc
- Binary: 100101100_{2}
- Ternary: 102010_{3}
- Senary: 1220_{6}
- Octal: 454_{8}
- Duodecimal: 210_{12}
- Hexadecimal: 12C_{16}
- Hebrew: ש
- Armenian: Յ
- Babylonian cuneiform: 𒐙
- Egyptian hieroglyph: 𓍤

300 (three hundred) is the natural number following 299 and preceding 301.

== In mathematics ==
300 is a composite number and the 24th triangular number. It is also a second hexagonal number.

300 is the smallest triangular number that is the product of a nontrivial triangular and square number, 300 = 3 × 100, where 3 is triangular and 100 is square.

== Integers from 301 to 399 ==
=== 300s ===
==== 304 ====
304 = 2^{4} × 19. It is a primitive semiperfect number because it is a semiperfect number (1 + 2 + 16 + 19 + 38 + 76 + 152 = 304) that is not divisible by any other semiperfect number. It is an untouchable number because it is not equal to the sum of any number's proper divisors. 304 is a nontotient number because it is an even number and $\varphi(n)=304$ has no solution. It is the sum of consecutive primes in two different ways:

$$\sum_{n=9}^{16}p_n=23+29+31+37+41+43+47+53=304$$

and

$$\sum_{n=13}^{18}p_n=41+43+47+53+59+61=304$$.

==== 305 ====
305 = 5 × 61. It is the fifth hexagonal prism number which is defined by $(n+1)(3n^2+3n+1)$. It is the convolution of the first 7 primes with themselves. It is the hypotenuse of two Pythagorean triples: 305^{2} = 207^{2} + 224^{2} = 136^{2} + 273^{2}.

==== 306 ====
306 = 2 × 3^{2} × 17. It is the 17th oblong number meaning that it is equal to 17 × 18. It is an untouchable number meaning that it cannot be equal to the sum of proper factors in any number. It is the sum of four consecutive primes (71 + 73 + 79 + 83).

It is the second smallest number after 276 for which it is not known if the corresponding aliquot sequence either terminates or ends in a repeating cycle. It follows the same sequence as 276, since its aliquot sum is the same as 276.

There are 306 triangular numbers with 5 digits.

==== 307 ====
307 is an isolated (i.e., not twin) prime, but because 309 is a semiprime, 307 is a Chen prime. 307 is the third non-palindromic number to have a palindromic square. 307^{2} = 94249.

307 is one of only 16 natural numbers for which the imaginary quadratic field $\mathbb{Q}(\sqrt{-n})$ has class number 3.

There are 307 one-sided noniamonds meaning that it is the number of ways to organize 9 triangles with each one touching at least one other on the edge.

There are 307 solid partitions of 7.

==== 308 ====
308 = 2^{2} × 7 × 11. It is a nontotient, a heptagonal pyramidal number, and the sum of two consecutive primes (151 + 157). It is the totient sum of the first 41 integers.

==== 309 ====
309 = 3 × 103. It is a Blum integer and a centered icosahedral number.

=== 310s ===
==== 310 ====
310 = 2 × 5 × 31. It is a sphenic number meaning that it has 3 prime factors. It is a noncototient number because m − φ(m) = 310 has no solutions. There are 310 Dyks 11 paths with strictly intersecting peaks. The sum of the divisors of 310 is a perfect square.

==== 311 ====
311 is a twin prime with 313, an irregular prime, an emirp, and a permutable prime with 113 and 131. It is an Eisenstein prime with no imaginary part and real part of the form $3n - 1$ and a Gaussian prime with no imaginary part and real part of the form $4n - 1$.

It can be expressed as a sum of consecutive primes in four different ways: as a sum of three consecutive primes (101 + 103 + 107), as a sum of five consecutive primes (53 + 59 + 61 + 67 + 71), as a sum of seven consecutive primes (31 + 37 + 41 + 43 + 47 + 53 + 59), and as a sum of eleven consecutive primes (11 + 13 + 17 + 19 + 23 + 29 + 31 + 37 + 41 + 43 + 47).

311 is a strictly non-palindromic number, as it is not palindromic in any base between base 2 and base 309.

311 is the smallest positive integer d such that the imaginary quadratic field Q(√–d) has a class number of 19.

4^{311} − 3^{311} is a prime number.

For all integers n from 1 to 42, the value of 311 log_{2}(n) is within ¼ of an integer.

==== 312 ====
312 = 2^{3} × 3 × 13. It is a Idoneal number and a practical number. It is a semiperfect number, as it is equal to the sum of some or all of its divisors (13 + 39 + 104 + 156 = 312). It is a Harshad number, as it is divisible by the sum of its digits. It is part of a Pythagorean triple.

==== 313 ====
313 is a twin prime with 311, a Pythagorean prime, a regular prime, a truncatable prime, a weakly prime in base 5, and a palindromic prime in both decimal and binary. It is also the smallest number which is a full full reptend prime in base 10 but not in base 2 to 9. It is an index of a prime Lucas number, a centered square number, and a happy number.

==== 314 ====
314 = 2 × 157.It is a nontotient and a squarefree semiprime. It forms a Pythagorean triple with 170 and 264. It is also what the first three digits of π (pi) would look like if the decimal point was removed.

==== 315 ====
315 = 3^{2} × 5 × 7. It is a rencontres number and an odd highly composite number.

Because the sum of the divisors of 315 is 309 and since 309 is less than 315, 315 is a deficient number.

==== 316 ====
316 = 2^{2} × 79. It is a centered triangular number, a centered heptagonal number, an Ulam number, and a member of one Tetranacci sequence. It appears in counting asymmetric polyominoes and binary-matrix involutions.

==== 317 ====
317 is a Chen prime and an Eisenstein prime with no imaginary part. It is one of the rare primes that is both right and left truncatable, that is, one can remove the rightmost or leftmost digit, resulting in 31 and 17 respectively, both of which are still prime. It is one of only two 3-digit primes satisfying the equation as p:

$$2^p+p=q$$

where p and q are both prime.

317 is also a strictly non-palindromic number.

317 is the telephone area code for the city of Indianapolis, Indiana, United States and its surrounding counties. Because of this, the city celebrates 317 Day on March 17 (3/17), which has become a major cultural event in the city.

==== 319 ====
319 = 11 × 29. It is a semiprime since it is the product of two distinct prime numbers. It is also a Smith number, a happy number in base 10, an Ulam number, and a lucky number. It cannot be represented as the sum of fewer than 19 fourth powers. It is the sum of consecutive primes: 103 + 107 + 109. It is also the sum of consecutive integers in three ways:

- 159 + 160
- 24 + 25 + 26 + 27 + 28 + 29 + 30 + 31 + 32 + 33 + 34
- 4 + 5 + 6 + 7 + 8 + 9 + 10 + 11 + 12 + 13 + 14 + 15 + 16 + 17 + 18 + 19 + 20 + 21 + 22 + 23 + 24 + 25

319 is a Toothpick number, i.e. it is a member of the Toothpick sequence. 319 is the number of toothpicks placed in stage 25.

319 is the sum of four square numbers but none fewer. Lagrange's four-square theorem states that all integers can be expressed as the sum of four squares. However, although 284 can be expressed as "284 = 12 + 22 + 52 + 172", it is impossible to express it as the sum of two or three squares; not all numbers have this property.

=== 320s ===
==== 320 ====
320 = 2^{6} × 5 = (2^{5}) × (2 × 5). It is a Leyland number, and the maximum determinant of a 10 by 10 matrix of zeros and ones.

==== 321 ====
321 = 3 × 107. It is a Delannoy number

==== 322 ====
322 = 2 × 7 × 23. It is a sphenic, a nontotient, an untouchable number, and a Lucas number. It is also the first unprimeable number to end in 2.

==== 323 ====
323 is a semiprime, and the product of two consecutive prime numbers (17 × 19). It is also the sum of nine consecutive primes (19 + 23 + 29 + 31 + 37 + 41 + 43 + 47 + 53) and the sum of the 13 consecutive primes (5 + 7 + 11 + 13 + 17 + 19 + 23 + 29 + 31 + 37 + 41 + 43 + 47)

323 is the eighth Motzkin number, $M_8$, meaning there are 323 ways to draw non-intersecting chords between eight points on a circle.

323 is the first Lucas pseudoprime with parameters (P, Q) defined by Selfridge's method. Additionally, it is the first Fibonacci pseudoprime (Lucas pseudoprime with P = 1 and Q = −1).

==== 324 ====
324 = 2^{2} × 3^{4}. It is a regular number, an abundant number, a Nialpdrome, an Ulam number, a powerful number, and an untouchable number, also called a nonaliquot number. It is the totient sum of the first 32 integers. It is the largest possible product of a set of positive integers with a sum of 16.

It is a perfect square number, since 324 equals 18^{2}, which is 18 × 18. It is also a Harshad number, sometimes called a Niven number, since the digit sum of 324 equals to 9 and 324 is a multiple of 9.

==== 325 ====
325 = 5^{2} × 13. It is the smallest number to be the sum of two squares in 3 different ways: 1^{2} + 18^{2}, 6^{2} + 17^{2} and 10^{2} + 15^{2}. It is the smallest (and only known) 3-hyperperfect number.

==== 326 ====
326 = 2 × 163. It is a nontotient, a noncototient, an untouchable number, and a lazy caterer number. It is the sum of the 14 consecutive primes (3 + 5 + 7 + 11 + 13 + 17 + 19 + 23 + 29 + 31 + 37 + 41 + 43 + 47).

==== 327 ====
327 = 3 × 109. It is a perfect totient number. There are 327 compositions of 10 whose run-lengths are either weakly increasing or weakly decreasing.

==== 328 ====
328 = 2^{3} × 41. It is a refactorable number. It is the sum of the first fifteen primes (2 + 3 + 5 + 7 + 11 + 13 + 17 + 19 + 23 + 29 + 31 + 37 + 41 + 43 + 47).

==== 329 ====
329 = 7 × 47. It is a highly cototient number. It is the sum of three consecutive primes (107 + 109 + 113).

=== 330s ===
==== 330 ====
330 = 2 × 3 × 5 × 11. It is a pentatope number (a binomial coefficient $\tbinom {11}4$), a pentagonal number, and a sparsely totient number. It is sum of six consecutive primes (43 + 47 + 53 + 59 + 61 + 67).

==== 331 ====
331 is a prime number, a super-prime, a cuban prime, a lucky prime, a centered pentagonal number, a centered hexagonal number, and a zero of Mertens function. It is the sum of five consecutive primes (59 + 61 + 67 + 71 + 73).

==== 332 ====
332 = 2^{2} × 83. It is a zero of Mertens function and number of inequivalent octagons.

==== 333 ====
333 = 3^{2} × 37. It is a harshad number, an odious number, and a zero of Mertens function.

It is also a palindromic number that is a repdigit in bases 8, 10, and 36. It is also the smallest multidigit composite palindrome such that the sum of its proper divisors is also a palindrome.

2^{333} is the smallest power of two greater than a googol.

There is a total of 333 septahexes.

==== 334 ====
334 = 2 × 167. It is a nontotient.

==== 335 ====
335 = 5 × 67. There are 335 Lyndon words of length 12.

==== 336 ====
336 = 2^{4} × 3 × 7. It is an untouchable number and a largely composite number. There are 336 partitions of 41 into prime parts.

==== 337 ====
337 is a prime number, an emirp, a permutable prime, and a Chen prime.

==== 338 ====
338 = 2 × 13^{2}. It is a nontotient. There are 338 square (0,1)-matrices without zero rows and with exactly 4 entries equal to 1.

==== 339 ====
339 = 3 × 113. It is an Ulam number.

=== 340s ===
==== 340 ====
340 = 2^{2} × 5 × 17. It is a noncototient and a nontotient.

It is the sum of the first four powers of 4 (4^{1} + 4^{2} + 4^{3} + 4^{4}), the sum of eight consecutive primes (29 + 31 + 37 + 41 + 43 + 47 + 53 + 59), and the sum of ten consecutive primes (17 + 19 + 23 + 29 + 31 + 37 + 41 + 43 + 47 + 53).

There are 340 regions formed by drawing the line segments connecting any two of the 12 perimeter points of a 3 times 3 grid of squares (sequence A331452 in the OEIS) and (sequence A255011 in the OEIS).

==== 342 ====
342 = 2 × 3^{2} × 19. It is a pronic number, and an untouchable number.

==== 344 ====
344 = 2^{3} × 43. It is an octahedral number, a noncototient, a refactorable number, and the totient sum of the first 33 integers.

==== 345 ====
345 = 3 × 5 × 23. It is a sphenic number and an idoneal number.

==== 346 ====
346 = 2 × 173. It is a Smith number and a noncototient.

==== 348 ====
348 = 2^{2} × 3 × 29. It is a refactorable number. It is the sum of four consecutive primes (79 + 83 + 89 + 97).

==== 349 ====
349 is a prime number, a twin prime with 347, and a lucky prime. It is the sum of three consecutive primes (109 + 113 + 127).

5^{349} - 4^{349} is a prime number.

=== 350s ===
==== 350 ====
350 = 2 × 5^{2} × 7. It is a primitive semiperfect number and a nontotient. A truncated icosahedron of frequency 6 has 350 hexagonal faces and 12 pentagonal faces.

350= $\left\{ {7 \atop 4} \right\}$, making 350 a stirling number of the second kind.

==== 351 ====
351 = 3^{3} × 13. It is a member of the Padovan sequence and the 26th triangular number. It is the sum of five consecutive primes (61 + 67 + 71 + 73 + 79). There are 351 compositions of 15 into distinct parts.

==== 352 ====
352 = 2^{5} × 11. It is a lazy caterer number and the sum of two consecutive primes (173 + 179). There are 352 n-Queens Problem solutions for n = 9.

==== 354 ====
354 = 2 × 3 × 59 = 1^{4} + 2^{4} + 3^{4} + 4^{4}. It is a sphenic number and a nontotient. It is also sum of absolute value of the coefficients of Conway's polynomial.

==== 355 ====
355 = 5 × 71. It is a Smith number and a zero of Mertens function. The cototient of 355 is 75, where 75 is the product of its digits (3 × 5 × 5 = 75).

It is the numerator of, 355/113, the best simplified rational approximation of pi having a denominator of four digits or fewer, known as Milü.

==== 356 ====
356 = 2^{2} × 89. It is a zero of Mertens function.

==== 357 ====
357 = 3 × 7 × 17. It is a sphenic number.

==== 358 ====
358 = 2 × 179. It is a zero of Mertens function and the sum of six consecutive primes (47 + 53 + 59 + 61 + 67 + 71). There are 358 ways to partition {1,2,3,4,5} and then partition each cell (block) into subcells.

==== 359 ====
359 is an Eisenstein prime with no imaginary part and a Chen prime. It is a strictly non-palindromic number.

=== 360s ===
==== 361 ====
361 = 19^{2}. 361 is a centered triangular number, a centered octagonal number, a centered decagonal number and a member of the Mian–Chowla sequence. There are 361 intersections on a standard 19×19 Go board.

==== 362 ====
362 = 2 × 181. It is a zero of Mertens function, a nontotient, a noncototient.

362 = σ_{2}(19), the sum of squares of divisors of 19.

==== 363 ====
363 = 3 × 11^{2}. It is a deficient number, a perfect totient number, a zero of Mertens function, and a repdigit (BB) in base 32. It is a palindromic number in bases 3, 10, 11 and 32. It is the sum of nine consecutive primes (23 + 29 + 31 + 37 + 41 + 43 + 47 + 53 + 59) and the sum of five consecutive powers of 3 (3 + 9 + 27 + 81 + 243).

363 can be expressed as the sum of three squares in four different ways:

363 = 11^{2} + 11^{2} + 11^{2} = 5^{2} + 7^{2} + 17^{2} = 1^{2} + 1^{2} + 19^{2} = 13^{2} + 13^{2} + 5^{2}.

363 cubits is the solution given to Rhind Mathematical Papyrus question 50 – find the side length of an octagon with the same area as a circle 9 khet in diameter.

==== 364 ====
364 = 2^{2} × 7 × 13. It is a tetrahedral number, a zero of Mertens function, a nontotient, and the sum of twelve consecutive primes (11 + 13 + 17 + 19 + 23 + 29 + 31 + 37 + 41 + 43 + 47 + 53).

It is a repdigit in base 3 (111111), base 9 (444), base 25 (EE), base 27 (DD), base 51 (77) and base 90 (44).

==== 367 ====
367 is a prime number, a lucky prime, a Perrin number, a happy number in base 10, a prime index prime and a strictly non-palindromic number.

==== 368 ====
368 = 2^{4} × 23. It is a Leyland number.

==== 369 ====
369 = 3^{2} × 41. 369 is the magic constant of the 9 × 9 magic square and the n-Queens Problem for n = 9. 369 forms a Ruth-Aaron Pair with 370 because the sums of their prime factors are equal.

There are 369 free octominoes (polyominoes of order 8).

=== 370s ===
==== 370 ====
370 = 2 × 5 × 37. It is a sphenic number, a nontotient, and a Base 10 Armstrong number since 3^{3} + 7^{3} + 0^{3} = 370. It forms a Ruth–Aaron pair with only distinct prime factors counted with 369. It is the sum of four consecutive primes (83 + 89 + 97 + 101).

==== 371 ====
371 = 7 × 53. It is an Armstrong number since 3^{3} + 7^{3} + 1^{3} = 371. It is the sum of the primes from its least to its greatest prime factor, the next such composite number is 2935561623745. It is the sum of three consecutive primes (113 + 127 + 131) and the sum of seven consecutive primes (41 + 43 + 47 + 53 + 59 + 61 + 67).

==== 372 ====
372 = 2^{2} × 3 × 31. It is a noncototient, an untouchable number, and a refactorable number. It is the sum of eight consecutive primes (31 + 37 + 41 + 43 + 47 + 53 + 59 + 61).

==== 373 ====
373 is a prime number, a balanced prime, a right and left-truncatable (two-sided prime), a sexy prime with 367 and 379, and a permutable prime with 337 and 733. It is also a palindromic prime in 3 consecutive bases: 565_{8} = 454_{9} = 373_{10} and also in base 4: 11311_{4}. It is the sum of five consecutive primes (67 + 71 + 73 + 79 + 83).

==== 374 ====
374 = 2 × 11 × 17. It is a sphenic number and a nontotient. 374^{4} + 1 is prime.

==== 375 ====
375 = 3 × 5^{3}. There are 375 regions in regular 11-gon with all diagonals drawn.

==== 376 ====
376 = 2^{3} × 47. It is a pentagonal number, a 1-automorphic number, a nontotient, and a refactorable number.

==== 377 ====
377 is a semiprime and a deficient number. 377 is the 7th centered octahedral number and the 14th nonzero member of the Fibonacci sequence.

==== 378 ====
378 = 2 × 3^{3} × 7. It is a cake number, a hexagonal number, and a Smith number. It is the 27th triangular number.

==== 379 ====
379 is a prime number, a Chen prime, a lazy caterer number and a happy number in base 10. It is the sum of the first 15 odd primes (3 + 5 + 7 + 11 + 13 + 17 + 19 + 23 + 29 + 31 + 37 + 41 + 43 + 47 + 53). 379! - 1 is prime.

=== 380s ===
==== 380 ====
380 = 2^{2} × 5 × 19. It is a pronic number. There are 380 regions when a figure made up of a row of 6 adjacent congruent rectangles is divided by drawing the diagonals of all possible rectangles.

==== 381 ====
381 = 3 × 127. It is palindromic in base 2 and base 8.

381 is the sum of the first 16 prime numbers (2 + 3 + 5 + 7 + 11 + 13 + 17 + 19 + 23 + 29 + 31 + 37 + 41 + 43 + 47 + 53).

==== 382 ====
382 = 2 × 191. It is a Smith number. It is the sum of ten consecutive primes (19 + 23 + 29 + 31 + 37 + 41 + 43 + 47 + 53 + 59).

==== 383 ====
383 is a prime number, a safe prime, a Woodall prime, a Thabit number, an Eisenstein prime with no imaginary part, and a palindromic prime. It is also the first number where the sum of a prime and the reversal of the prime is also a prime. 4^{383} - 3^{383} is prime.

==== 385 ====
385 = 5 × 7 × 11. It is a sphenic number and a square pyramidal number. There are 385 integer partitions of 18.

385 = 10^{2} + 9^{2} + 8^{2} + 7^{2} + 6^{2} + 5^{2} + 4^{2} + 3^{2} + 2^{2} + 1^{2}.

==== 386 ====
386 = 2 × 193. It is a nontotient, a noncototient, and a centered heptagonal number. There are 388 surface points on a cube with edge-length 9.

==== 387 ====
387 = 3^{2} × 43. There are 387 graphical partitions of 22. 387 is the last three digits of Graham's number.

==== 388 ====
388 = 2^{2} × 97. It is the solution to the postage stamp problem with 6 stamps and 6 denominations. There are 388 uniform rooted trees with 10 nodes.

==== 389 ====
389 is a prime number, an emirp, an Eisenstein prime with no imaginary part, a Chen prime, a highly cototient number, a strictly non-palindromic number. It is the smallest conductor of a rank 2 Elliptic curve.

=== 390s ===
==== 390 ====
390 = 2 × 3 × 5 × 13. It is a nontotient and the sum of four consecutive primes (89 + 97 + 101 + 103).

$\sum_{n=0}^{10}{390}^{n}$ is prime

==== 391 ====
391 = 17 × 23. It is a Smith number and a centered pentagonal number.

==== 392 ====
392 = 2^{3} × 7^{2}. It is an Achilles number.

==== 393 ====
393 = 3 × 131. It is a Blum integer and a zero of Mertens function.

==== 394 ====
394 = 2 × 197 = S_{5} It is a Schröder number, a nontotient, and a noncototient.

==== 395 ====
395 = 5 × 79. There are 395 (unordered, unlabeled) rooted trimmed trees with 11 nodes.

395 is sum of three consecutive primes (127 + 131 + 137) and the sum of five consecutive primes (71 + 73 + 79 + 83 + 89).

==== 396 ====
396 = 2^{2} × 3^{2} × 11. It is the sum of twin primes (197 + 199), the totient sum of the first 36 integers, a refactorable number, a Harshad number, and a digit-reassembly number.

==== 397 ====
397 is a prime number, a cuban prime, and a centered hexagonal number.

==== 398 ====
398 = 2 × 199. It is a nontotient.

$\sum_{n=0}^{10}{398}^{n}$ is prime
