= 500 (number) =

| ← 499 | 500 | 501 → |
- List of numbers; Integers; ← 0 100 200 300 400 500 600 700 800 900 →
- Cardinal: five hundred
- Ordinal: 500th (five hundredth)
- Factorization: 2^{2} × 5^{3}
- Greek numeral: Φ´
- Roman numeral: D
- Binary: 111110100_{2}
- Ternary: 200112_{3}
- Senary: 2152_{6}
- Octal: 764_{8}
- Duodecimal: 358_{12}
- Hexadecimal: 1F4_{16}
- Armenian: Շ
- Hebrew: ת"ק / ך
- Babylonian cuneiform: 𒐜⟪
- Egyptian hieroglyph: 𓍦

500 (five hundred) is the natural number following 499 and preceding 501.

== Mathematical properties ==
500 = 2^{2} × 5^{3}. It is an Achilles number, meaning that it is divisible by the squares of its prime factors (i.e. 4 and 25) but is not a power itself, and a Harshad number, meaning it is divisible by the sum of its digits. It is the number of planar partitions of 10.

== Integers from 501 to 599 ==
=== 500s ===
==== 502 ====
502 = 2 × 251. It is a vertically symmetric number.

==== 503 ====
503 is a prime number, a safe prime, a Chen prime, an Eisenstein prime with no imaginary part, an index of a prime Lucas number, and an isolated prime. It is the sum of three consecutive primes (163 + 167 + 173) and the sum of the cubes of the first four primes.

==== 504 ====
504 = 2^{3} × 3^{2} × 7. It is a tribonacci number, a semi-meandric number, a refactorable number, a Harshad number and a largely composite number. It is the sum of the smallest pair of amicable numbers: (220, 284). The group order of the fourth smallest non-cyclic simple group, A_{1}(8) = ^{2}G_{2}(3)′, is 504. There are 504 symmetries of the simple group PSL(2,8) that is the automorphism group of the Macbeath surface.

$\sum_{n=0}^{10}{504}^{n}$ is prime.

==== 505 ====
505 = 5 × 101. It is the magic constant of n×n normal magic square and n-queens problem for n = 10.

==== 506 ====
506 = 2 × 11 × 23. It is a sphenic number, a square pyramidal number, a pronic number, a Harshad number.

$10^{506}-10^{253}-1$ is a prime number. Its decimal expansion is 252 nines, an eight, and 253 more nines.

==== 507 ====
507 = 3 × 13^{2}. it is a central polygonal number because 507=23^{2} - 23 + 1.

==== 508 ====
508 = 2^{2} × 127. It is the sum of four consecutive primes (113 + 127 + 131 + 137). There are 508 graphical forest partitions of 30. Since 508 = 22^{2} + 22 + 2, it is the maximum number of regions into which 23 intersecting circles divide the plane.

==== 509 ====
509 is a prime number, a Chen prime, an Eisenstein prime with no imaginary part, a highly cototient number and a prime index prime.

It is a Sophie Germain prime, additionally, it is the smallest Sophie Germain prime to start a 4-term Cunningham chain of the first kind {509, 1019, 2039, 4079}.

=== 510s ===
==== 510 ====
510 = 2 × 3 × 5 × 17. It is a nontotient, a sparsely totient number, and a Harshad number. There are 510 nonempty proper subsets of an 9-element set.

It is the sum of eight consecutive primes (47 + 53 + 59 + 61 + 67 + 71 + 73 + 79), the sum of ten consecutive primes (31 + 37 + 41 + 43 + 47 + 53 + 59 + 61 + 67 + 71), and the sum of twelve consecutive primes (19 + 23 + 29 + 31 + 37 + 41 + 43 + 47 + 53 + 59 + 61 + 67).

==== 513 ====
513 = 3^{3} × 19. It is a Harshad number and a Leyland number of the second kind, using 3 & 6 (3^{6} - 6^{3}). It is palindromic in bases 2 (1000000001_{2}) and 8 (1001_{8}).

==== 514 ====
514 = 2 × 257. It is a centered triangular number and a nontotient. It is a palindrome in bases 4 (20002_{4}), 16 (202_{16}), and 19 (181_{19}).

==== 515 ====
515 = 5 × 103. It is the sum of nine consecutive primes (41 + 43 + 47 + 53 + 59 + 61 + 67 + 71 + 73). There are 515 complete compositions of 11.

==== 516 ====
516 = 2^{2} × 3 × 43. It is a nontotient, an untouchable number, a refactorable number, and a Harshad number.

==== 517 ====
517 = 11 × 47. It is a Smith number and the sum of five consecutive primes (97 + 101 + 103 + 107 + 109).

==== 518 ====
518 = 2 × 7 × 37. It is a sphenic number, a nontotient, an untouchable number, and a Harshad number. It is a repdigit (and is therefore palindromic) in bases 6 (2222_{6}) and 36 (EE_{36}).

518= 5^{1} + 1^{2} + 8^{3}, a property shared with 175 and 598.

==== 519 ====
519 = 3 × 173. It is palindromic in bases 9 (636_{9}) and 12 (373_{12}), and it is a D-number. It is the sum of three consecutive primes (167 + 173 + 179).

=== 520s ===
==== 520 ====
520 = 2^{3} × 5 × 13. It is an untouchable number, an idoneal number, and a palindromic number in base 14 (292_{14}).

==== 521 ====
521 is a prime number, a Lucas prime. a Chen prime, and an Eisenstein prime with no imaginary part. It is palindromic in bases 11 (434_{11}) and 20 (161_{20}).

It is a Mersenne exponent, i.e. 2^{521}−1 is prime. It is the largest known such exponent that is the lesser of twin primes.

4^{521} - 3^{521} is prime.

==== 522 ====
522 = 2 × 3^{2} × 29. It is a repdigit in bases 28 (II_{28}) and 57 (99_{57}) and a Harshad number. It is the sum of six consecutive primes (73 + 79 + 83 + 89 + 97 + 101).

There are 522 series-parallel networks with 8 unlabeled edges.

==== 523 ====
523 is a prime number and a prime with a prime number of prime digits. It is palindromic in bases 13 (313_{13}) and 18 (1B1_{18}). It is the smallest prime number that starts a prime gap of length greater than 14. It is the sum of seven consecutive primes (61 + 67 + 71 + 73 + 79 + 83 + 89).

==== 524 ====
524 = 2^{2} × 131. There are 524 partitions of 44 into powers of 2.

==== 525 ====
525 = 3 × 5^{2} × 7. It is a self number, and it is palindromic in base ten.

It is the sum of all prime numbers that divide the orders of the twenty-six sporadic groups (2, 3, 5, ..., 71; aside from 53 and 61).

It is the sum of the dimensions of all five exceptional Lie algebras (14, 52, 78, 133, 248).

==== 526 ====
526 = 2 × 263. It is a centered pentagonal number, a nontotient, and a Smith number.

==== 527 ====
527 = 17 × 31. It is palindromic in base 15 (252_{15}).

There are 527 diagonals in a 34-gon

==== 528 ====
528 = 2^{4} × 3 × 11. It is palindromic in bases 9 (646_{9}) and 17 (1E1_{17}). It is the 32nd triangular number, and the 167th Totient number.

==== 529 ====
529 = 23^{2}. It is a centered octagonal number and a lazy caterer number.

=== 530s ===
==== 530 ====
530 = 2 × 5 × 53. It is an untouchable number, a sphenic number, and a nontotient. It is palindromic in bases 4 (20102_{4}), 16 (212_{16}), and 23 (101_{23}). It is the sum of totient function for first 41 integers and the sum of the first three perfect numbers.

==== 531 ====
531 = 3^{2} × 59. It is palindromic in base 12 (383_{12}) and a Harshad number.

There are 531 symmetric matrices with nonnegative integer entries and without zero rows or columns such that sum of all entries is equal to 6.

==== 532 ====
532 = 2^{2} × 7 × 19. It is a pentagonal number, a nontotient, and an admirable number. It is a repdigit and thus palindromic in bases 11 (444_{11}), 27 (JJ_{27}), and 37 (EE_{37}).

==== 533 ====
533 = 13 × 41. It is palindromic in base 19 (191_{19}) and a generalized octagonal number. It is the sum of three consecutive primes (173 + 179 + 181) and the sum of five consecutive primes (101 + 103 + 107 + 109 + 113).

==== 534 ====
534 = 2 × 3 × 89. It is a sphenic number, a nontotient and an admirable number. It is palindromic in bases 5 (4114_{5}) and 14 (2A2_{14}). It is the sum of four consecutive primes (127 + 131 + 137 + 139).

$\sum_{n=0}^{10}{534}^{n}$ is prime

==== 535 ====
535 = 5 × 107. It is a Smith number.

$34 n^3 + 51 n^2 + 27 n+ 5=535$ for $n = 2$; this polynomial plays an essential role in Apéry's proof that $\zeta(3)$ is irrational.

535 is used as an abbreviation for May 35, which is used in China instead of June 4 to evade censorship by the Chinese government of references on the Internet to the Tiananmen Square protests of 1989.

==== 536 ====
536 = 2^{3} × 67. It is a refactorable number, the 168th Totient number, and the lowest happy number beginning with the digit 5.

There are 536 ways to arrange the pieces of the ostomachion into a square, not counting rotation or reflection.

There are 536 1's in all partitions of 23 into odd parts.

==== 537 ====
537 = 3 × 179. It is a Blum integer, a D-number, and a zero of the Mertens function.

==== 538 ====
538 = 2 × 269. It is a nontotient and an open meandric number.

Other fields:

There are a total of 538 votes in the United States Electoral College. The US political news site, FiveThirtyEight, is a reference to the electoral college.

Radio 538 is a Dutch commercial radio station.

==== 539 ====
539 = 7^{2} × 11.

$\sum_{n=0}^{10}{539}^{n}$ is prime.

=== 540s ===
==== 540 ====
540 = 2^{2} × 3^{3} × 5. It is a largely composite number, an untouchable number, a heptagonal number, and a decagonal number.

It is the sum of a pair of twin primes (269 + 271) and a repdigit in bases 26 (KK_{26}), 29 (II_{29}), 35 (FF_{35}), 44 (CC_{44}), 53 (AA_{53}), and 59 (99_{59}).

==== 541 ====
541 is the 100th prime, a lucky prime, a Chen prime, a zero of the Mertens function and a star number. It is palindromic in bases 18 (1C1_{18}) and 20 (171_{20}). It is the fifth ordered Bell number that represents the number of ordered partitions of $[5]$.

4^{541} - 3^{541} is prime.

==== 542 ====
542 = 2 × 271. It is a nontotient and the sum of totient function for the first 42 integers.

==== 543 ====
543 = 3 × 181. It is palindromic in bases 11 (454_{11}) and 12 (393_{12}) and a D-number.

$\sum_{n=0}^{10}{543}^{n}$ is prime

==== 544 ====
544 = 2^{5} × 17. Take a grid of 2 times 5 points. There are 14 points on the perimeter. Join every pair of the perimeter points by a line segment. The lines do not extend outside the grid. 544 is the number of regions formed by these lines. (sequence A331452 in the OEIS)

544 is also the number of pieces that could be seen in a 5×5×5×5 Rubik's Tesseract. As a standard 5×5×5 has 98 visible pieces (5^{3} − 3^{3}), a 5×5×5×5 has 544 visible pieces (5^{4} − 3^{4}).

==== 545 ====
545 = 5 × 109. It is a centered square number, and it is palindromic in bases 10 (545_{10}) and 17 (1F1_{17}).

==== 546 ====
546 = 2 × 3 × 7 × 13. It is a repdigit in bases 9 and 16, and it is palindromic in bases 4 (20202_{4}), 9 (666_{9}), and 16 (222_{16}). It is the sum of eight consecutive primes (53 + 59 + 61 + 67 + 71 + 73 + 79 + 83).

546! − 1 is prime.

==== 547 ====
547 is a prime number, a cuban prime, a centered hexagonal number, a centered heptagonal number, and a prime index prime.

==== 548 ====
548 = 2^{2} × 137. It is a nontotient. Every positive integer is the sum of at most 548 ninth powers.

==== 549 ====
549 = 3^{2} × 61. It is a repdigit in bases 13 (333_{13}) and 60 (99_{60}).

φ(549) = φ(σ(549)).

=== 550s ===
==== 550 ====
550 = 2 × 5^{2} × 11. It is a pentagonal pyramidal number, a primitive abundant number, a nontotient, and a Harshad number. It is a repdigit in bases 24 (MM_{24}), 49 (BB_{49}), and 54 (AA_{54}).

==== 551 ====
551 = 19 × 29. It is palindromic in base 22 (131_{22}) and the sum of three consecutive primes (179 + 181 + 191).

There are 551 mathematical trees on 12 unlabeled nodes.

==== 552 ====
552 = 2^{3} × 3 × 23. It is a pronic number, an untouchable number, and a Harshad number. It is palindromic in base 19 (1A1_{19}). It is the sum of six consecutive primes (79 + 83 + 89 + 97 + 101 + 103) and the sum of ten consecutive primes (37 + 41 + 43 + 47 + 53 + 59 + 61 + 67 + 71 + 73).

There are 552 prime knots with 11 crossings.

==== 553 ====
553 = 7 × 79. It is a central polygonal number and the sum of nine consecutive primes (43 + 47 + 53 + 59 + 61 + 67 + 71 + 73 + 79).

==== 554 ====
554 = 2 × 277. It is a nontotient and a 2-Knödel number.

Mertens function(554) = 6, a record high that stands until 586.

==== 555 ====
555= 3 × 5 × 37. It is a sphenic number. It is a repdigit in base 10 and base 36. It is palindromic in bases 9 (676_{9}), 10 (555_{10}), and 12 (3A3_{12}). Because it is divisible by the sum of its digits (15), it is a Harshad number. It is also a Harshad number in binary, base 11, base 13 and hexadecimal.

555 is also a Moran number, because 555 ÷ (5+5+5) = 555 ÷ 15 = 37, and 37 is prime.

==== 556 ====
556 = 2^{2} × 139. It is a happy number and an untouchable number, because it is never the sum of the proper divisors of any integer. It is the sum of four consecutive primes (131 + 137 + 139 + 149).

==== 557 ====
557 is a prime number, a Chen prime, and an Eisenstein prime with no imaginary part.

There are 557 parallelogram polyominoes with 9 cells.

==== 558 ====
558 = 2 × 3^{2} × 31. It is a nontotient, a Harshad number, and a repdigit in bases 30 (II_{30}) and 61 (99_{61}).

==== 559 ====
559 = 13 × 43. It is a nonagonal number and a centered cube number. It is palindromic in base 18 (1D1_{18}). It is the sum of five consecutive primes (103 + 107 + 109 + 113 + 127) and the sum of seven consecutive primes (67 + 71 + 73 + 79 + 83 + 89 + 97).

=== 560s ===
==== 560 ====
560 = 2^{4} × 5 × 7. It is a tetrahedral number, an octagonal number, and a refactorable number. It is palindromic in bases 3 (202202_{3}) and 6 (2332_{6}). There are 560 diagonals in a 35-gon.

==== 562 ====
562 = 2 × 281. It is a Smith number, an untouchable number. and a lazy caterer number. It is palindromic in bases 4 (20302_{4}), 13 (343_{13}), 14 (2C2_{14}), 16 (232_{16}), and 17 (1G1_{17}). It is the sum of twelve consecutive primes (23 + 29 + 31 + 37 + 41 + 43 + 47 + 53 + 59 + 61 + 67 + 71).

562^{64} + 1 is prime

==== 564 ====
564 = 2^{2} × 3 × 47. It is a refactorable number and the sum of a pair of twin primes (281 + 283). It is palindromic in bases 5 (4224_{5}) and 9 (686_{9}). There are 564 primes less than or equal to 2^{12}.

==== 565 ====
565 = 5 × 113. It is a member of the Mian–Chowla sequence and a happy number. It is palindromic in bases 10 (565_{10}) and 11 (474_{11}). It is the sum of three consecutive primes (181 + 191 + 193).

==== 566 ====
566 = 2 × 283. It is a nontotient, a happy number, and a 2-Knödel number.

==== 567 ====
567 = 3^{4} × 7. It is palindromic in base 12 (3B3_{12}).

$\sum_{n=0}^{10}{567}^{n}$ is prime

==== 568 ====
568 = 2^{3} × 71. It is a refactorable number, and it is palindromic in bases 7 (1441_{7}) and 21 (161_{21}). It is the sum of the first nineteen primes. It is the smallest number whose seventh power is the sum of 7 seventh powers.

There are 568 millilitres in an imperial pint.

==== 569 ====
569 is a prime number, a Chen prime, an Eisenstein prime with no imaginary part, and a strictly non-palindromic number.

=== 570s ===
==== 570 ====
570 = 2 × 3 × 5 × 19. It is a triangular matchstick number and a balanced number.

==== 571 ====
571 is a prime number, a Chen prime, and a centered triangular number. There are 571 domino tilings of a 3x10 rectangle.

==== 572 ====
572 = 2^{2} × 11 × 13. It is a primitive abundant number and a nontotient. It is palindromic in bases 3 (210012_{3}) and 15 (282_{15}).

==== 573 ====
573 = 3 × 191. It is a Blum integer.

It is known as the Konami number, since "ko-na-mi" is associated with 573 in the Japanese wordplay Goroawase.

==== 574 ====
574 = 2 × 7 × 41. It is a sphenic number and a nontotient. It is palindromic in base 9 (707_{9}). There are 574 partitions of 27 that do not contain 1 as a part.

There are 574 amino acid residues in a hemoglobin molecule.

==== 575 ====
575 = 5^{2} × 23. It is palindromic in bases 10 (575_{10}) and 13 (353_{13}), and it is a centered octahedral number.

The sum of the squares of the first 575 primes is divisible by 575.

==== 576 ====
576 = 2^{6} × 3^{2} = 24^{2}. It is a highly totient number, a Smith number, an untouchable number, a Harshad number, and a cake number. It is the sum of four consecutive primes (137 + 139 + 149 + 151). It is palindromic in bases 11 (484_{11}), 14 (2D2_{14}), and 23 (121_{23}). There are 576 parts in all compositions of 8.

==== 577 ====
577 is a prime number, a Proth prime, and a Chen prime. It is palindromic in bases 18 (1E1_{18}) and 24 (101_{24}).

==== 578 ====
578 = 2 × 17^{2}. It is palindromic in base 16 (242_{16}), and it is a nontotient. The area of a square with diagonal 34 is 578.

==== 579 ====
579 = 3 × 193. It is a semiprime and a ménage number.

=== 580s ===
==== 580 ====
580 = 2^{2} × 5 × 29. It is palindromic in bases 12 (404_{12}) and 17 (202_{17}), and it is the sum of six consecutive primes (83 + 89 + 97 + 101 + 103 + 107).

==== 581 ====
581 = 7 × 83. It is a Blum integer and the sum of three consecutive primes (191 + 193 + 197).

==== 582 ====
582 = 2 × 3 × 97. It is a sphenic number, a nontotient, a vertically symmetric number, and an admirable number. It is the sum of eight consecutive primes (59 + 61 + 67 + 71 + 73 + 79 + 83 + 89).

==== 583 ====
583 = 11 × 53. It is palindromic in base 9 (717_{9}). There are 583 compositions of 11 whose run-lengths are either weakly increasing or weakly decreasing.

==== 584 ====
584 = 2^{3} × 73. It is an untouchable number, a refactorable number and the sum of totient function for first 43 integers.

==== 585 ====
585 = 3^{2} × 5 × 13. It is palindromic in bases 2 (1001001001_{2}), 8 (1111_{8}), and 10 (585_{10}). It is a repdigit in bases 8, 38, 44, and 64. It is the sum of powers of 8 from 0 to 3.

When counting in binary with fingers, expressing 585 as 1001001001, results in the isolation of the index and little fingers of each hand, "throwing up the horns".

==== 586 ====
586 = 2 × 293. It is a 2-Knödel number.

Mertens function(586) = 7 a record high that stands until 1357.

==== 587 ====
587 is a prime number, a safe prime, a Chen prime, an Eisenstein prime with no imaginary part, and a prime index prime. It is the sum of five consecutive primes (107 + 109 + 113 + 127 + 131). It is palindromic in bases 11 (494_{11}) and 15 (292_{15}).

==== 588 ====
588 = 2^{2} × 3 × 7^{2}. It is a Smith number and a Harshad number. It is palindromic in base 13 (363_{13}).

==== 589 ====
589 = 19 × 31. It is a centered tetrahedral number and the sum of three consecutive primes (193 + 197 + 199). It is palindromic in base 21 (171_{21}).

=== 590s ===
==== 590 ====
590 = 2 × 5 × 59. It is a sphenic number, a pentagonal number, and a nontotient. It is palindromic in base 19 (1C1_{19}).

==== 591 ====
591 = 3 × 197. It is a D-number

==== 592 ====
592 = 2^{4} × 37. It is a Harshad number. It is palindromic in bases 9 (727_{9}) and 12 (414_{12}).

592^{64} + 1 is prime

==== 593 ====
593 is a prime number. a Sophie Germain prime, an Eisenstein prime with no imaginary part, a balanced prime, a Leyland prime using 2 & 9 (2^{9} + 9^{2}), a member of the Mian–Chowla sequence, and a strictly non-palindromic number. It is the sum of seven consecutive primes (71 + 73 + 79 + 83 + 89 + 97 + 101) and the sum of nine consecutive primes (47 + 53 + 59 + 61 + 67 + 71 + 73 + 79 + 83).

==== 594 ====
594 = 2 × 3^{3} × 11. It is a nontotient, a Harshad number, and a balanced number. It is palindromic in bases 5 (4334_{5}) and 16 (252_{16}). It is the sum of ten consecutive primes (41 + 43 + 47 + 53 + 59 + 61 + 67 + 71 + 73 + 79). There are 594 of diagonals in a 36-gon.

==== 595 ====
595 = 5 × 7 × 17. It is a sphenic number, a centered nonagonal number, and the 34th triangular number. It is palindromic in bases 10 (595_{10}) and 18 (1F1_{18}).

==== 596 ====
596 = 2^{2} × 149. It is a nontotient and a lazy caterer number. It is the sum of four consecutive primes (139 + 149 + 151 + 157).

==== 597 ====
597 = 3 × 199. It is a Blum integer

==== 598 ====
598 = 2 × 13 × 23 = 5^{1} + 9^{2} + 8^{3}. It is palindromic in bases 4 (21112_{4}) and 11 (4A4_{11}), and it is a sphenic number. There are 598 non-alternating permutations of {1...6}.

==== 599 ====
599 is a prime number, a Chen prime, an Eisenstein prime with no imaginary part, and a prime index prime.

4^{599} - 3^{599} is prime.
