= 400 (number) =

← 399	400	401 →
- List of numbers; Integers; ← 0 100 200 300 400 500 600 700 800 900 →
- Cardinal: four hundred
- Ordinal: 400th (four hundredth)
- Factorization: 2^{4} × 5^{2}
- Divisors: 1, 2, 4, 5, 8, 10, 16, 20, 25, 40, 50, 80, 100, 200, 400
- Greek numeral: Υ´
- Roman numeral: CD, cd
- Binary: 110010000_{2}
- Ternary: 112211_{3}
- Senary: 1504_{6}
- Octal: 620_{8}
- Duodecimal: 294_{12}
- Hexadecimal: 190_{16}
- Hebrew: ת
- Armenian: Ն
- Babylonian cuneiform: 𒐚𒐏
- Egyptian hieroglyph: 𓍥

400 (four hundred) is the natural number following 399 and preceding 401.

== Mathematical properties ==
- A circle is divided into 400 grads.
- The number 400 equals 1111 in base 7.

== Integers from 401 to 499 ==
=== 400s ===
==== 401 ====
401 is the 79th prime number. It is a Ramanujan prime, a Pythagorean prime, a Chen prime, a super-prime, (Note: Super-prime is also known as "Prime-indexed prime".) and an Irregular prime. It is also a Tetranacci number, a zero of Mertens function, and a member of the Mian–Chowla sequence. There are 401 connected, planar, Eulerian graphs with a total of 9 vertices.

==== 402 ====
402 = 2 × 3 × 67. It is a sphenic number, a nontotient and a Harshad number. There are 402 graphs with 8 nodes and 9 edges.

==== 403 ====
403 = 13 × 31. It is a heptagonal number, a zero of Mertens function, and the smallest number that is the product of an emirp pair.

==== 404 ====
404 = 2^{2} × 101, a zero of Mertens function, a nontotient and a noncototient. There are 404 integer partitions of 20 with an alternating permutation.

The HTTP 404 status code is usually sent from a web page if a user attempts to reach a broken or dead link. It has since become one of the most commonly reached, and thus most recognizable errors on the World Wide Web.

==== 405 ====
405 = × 1 × 3 × 5 × 9 × 15 × 27 × 45 × 81 × 135 × 405. It is zero of Mertens function, a Harshad number, a regular number, and a odd pentagonal pyramidal number. It is an 5-almost prime, since it is the product of 5 primes. It is also the smallest number with 10 odd divisors.

In a fully solved Sudoku puzzle, the numbers sum up to 405. A Sudoku puzzle contains the digits from 1 to 9, and summing them equals 45. Since a Sudoku puzzle has 9 rows, multiplying 45 by 9 gives 405.

==== 406 ====
406 = 2 × 7 × 29. It is a sphenic number, the 28th triangular number, a centered nonagonal number, an even nontotient, and a Narayana's cow number.

406 is a poem by John Boyle O'Reilly. It was believed to have been the number of one of O'Reilly's prison cells, and was the number of his first hotel room after he arrived in the United States. Hence the number had a mystical significance to him, as intimated in the poem.

==== 407 ====
407 = 11 × 37. It is a zero of Mertens function, a Harshad number, and a Lazy caterer number.It is the sum of the cubes of 4, 0 and 7 (4^{3} + 0^{3} + 7^{3} = 407) and thus a narcissistic number. It is the sum of three consecutive primes (131 + 137 + 139).

==== 408 ====
408 = 2^{3} × 3 × 17. It is a Pell number, a zero of Mertens function, an Octagonal number, an Untouchable number and a Harshad number. It is the sum of four consecutive primes (97 + 101 + 103 + 107) and the sum of eight consecutive primes (37 + 41 + 43 + 47 + 53 + 59 + 61 + 67).

==== 409 ====
409 is a prime number, a Chen prime, and a centered triangular number.

=== 410s ===
==== 410 ====
410 = 2 × 5 × 41. It is a sphenic number, a nontotient, a Harshad number, and the sum of six consecutive primes (59 + 61 + 67 + 71 + 73 + 79). There are 410 triangle-free graphs on 8 vertices.

==== 411 ====
411 = 3 × 137. It is a self number.

==== 412 ====
412 = 2^{2} × 103. It is a nontotient, a noncototient, and the sum of twelve consecutive primes (13 + 17 + 19 + 23 + 29 + 31 + 37 + 41 + 43 + 47 + 53 + 59).

412^{64} + 1 is prime

==== 413 ====
413 = 7 × 59. It is a zero of Mertens function, a self number, and a Blum integer.

==== 414 ====
414 = 2 × 3^{2} × 23. It is a zero of Mertens function, a nontotient, and a Harshad number. There are 414 balanced partitions of 31.

$\sum_{n=0}^{10}{414}^{n}$ is prime

==== 415 ====
415 = 5 × 83. It is a logarithmic number.

==== 416 ====
416 = 2^{5} × 13. There are independent vertex sets and vertex covers in the 6-sunlet graph

==== 417 ====
417 = 3 × 139. It is a Blum integer.

==== 418 ====
418 = 2 × 11 × 19. It is a sphenic number, a balanced number. and the fourth 71-gonal number.

It is the sum of the integers between 13 and 31, inclusive.

The sum of the 84 digits of the 22nd unique prime in decimal (having a very distinct set of digits than all other known terms in the sequence). (Note: That number is 142,857,157,142,857,142,856,999,999,985,714,285,714,285,857,142,857,142,855,714,285,571,428,571,428,572,857,143)

==== 419 ====
419 is a prime number, a Sophie Germain prime, a Chen prime, an Eisenstein prime with no imaginary part, a highly cototient number, and a zero of Mertens function.

=== 420s ===
==== 421 ====
421 is a prime number, a centered square number, and the sum of five consecutive primes (73 + 79 + 83 + 89 + 97).

==== 422 ====
422 = 2 × 211. It is a zero of Mertens function and a nontotient. Since 422 = 20^{2} + 20 + 2, 422 is the maximum number of regions into which 21 intersecting circles divide the plane.

==== 423 ====
423 = 3^{2} × 47. It is a zero of Mertens function and a Harshad number.

There are 423 secondary structures of RNA molecules with 10 nucleotides

==== 424 ====
424 = 2^{3} × 53. It is a zero of Mertens function, a refactorable number, a self number and the sum of ten consecutive primes (23 + 29 + 31 + 37 + 41 + 43 + 47 + 53 + 59 + 61).

==== 425 ====
425 = 5^{2} × 17. It is a pentagonal number, a centered tetrahedral number, a zero of Mertens function, and the sum of three consecutive primes (137 + 139 + 149). It is the second number that can be expressed as the sum of two squares in three different ways (425 = 20^{2} + 5^{2} = 19^{2} + 8^{2} = 16^{2} + 13^{2}).

==== 426 ====
426 = 2 × 3 × 71. It is a sphenic number, a nontotient, and an untouchable number.

==== 427 ====
427 = 7 × 61. It is a zero of Mertens function.

427! + 1 is prime.

==== 428 ====
428 = 2^{2} × 107. It is a zero of Mertens function and a nontotient.

428^{32} + 1 is prime

==== 429 ====
429 = 3 × 11 × 13. It is a sphenic number and a Catalan number.

=== 430s ===
==== 430 ====
430 = 2 × 5 × 43. It is a sphenic number and an untouchable number.

==== 431 ====
431 is a prime number, a Sophie Germain prime, a Chen prime, a prime index prime, an Eisenstein prime with no imaginary part, the fourth Leyland prime of the second kind and the sum of seven consecutive primes (47 + 53 + 59 + 61 + 67 + 71 + 73).

==== 432 ====
432 = 2^{4} × 3^{3} = 4^{2} × 3^{3}. It is a Harshad number, a highly totient number, an Achilles number and the sum of the totient function for first 37 integers. It is the sum of four consecutive primes (103 + 107 + 109 + 113). 432! is the first factorial that is not a Harshad number in base 10. An equilateral triangle whose area and perimeter are equal has an area (and perimeter) equal to $\sqrt{432}$.

==== 433 ====
433 is a prime number, a Markov number, and a star number.

==== 434 ====
434 = 2 × 7 × 31. It is a sphenic number, a nontotient and the sum of six consecutive primes (61 + 67 + 71 + 73 + 79 + 83). It is the maximal number of pieces that can be obtained by cutting an annulus with 28 cuts.

==== 435 ====
435 = 3 × 5 × 29. It is a sphenic number, a hexagonal number, a self number, and the 29th triangular number. There are 435 compositions of 16 into distinct parts.

==== 436 ====
436 = 2^{2} × 109. It is a nontotient, a noncototient, and a lazy caterer number.

==== 437 ====
437 = 19 × 23. It is a Blum integer.

==== 438 ====
438 = 2 × 3 × 73. It is a sphenic number and a Smith number.

==== 439 ====
439 is a prime number and a strictly non-palindromic number. It is the sum of three consecutive primes (139 + 149 + 151) and the sum of nine consecutive primes (31 + 37 + 41 + 43 + 47 + 53 + 59 + 61 + 67).

=== 440s ===
==== 440 ====
440 = 2^{3} × 5 × 11. It is a Harshad number, an abundant number, a happy number, and the sum of the first 17 prime numbers.

A440 (pitch standard) is widely used for the musical note A4, the A above Middle C, when tuning instruments.

==== 441 ====
441 = 3^{2} × 7^{2} = 21. It is a centered octagonal number, a refactorable number, and a Harshad number.

441 is also the sum of the cubes of the first 6 natural numbers: 441 = 1^{3} + 2^{3} + 3^{3} + 4^{3} + 5^{3} + 6^{3}.

==== 442 ====
442 = 2 × 13 × 17. It is a sphenic number and the sum of eight consecutive primes (41 + 43 + 47 + 53 + 59 + 61 + 67 + 71).

==== 443 ====
443 is a prime number, a Sophie Germain prime, a Chen prime, and an Eisenstein prime with no imaginary part.

Mertens function of 443 is -9, a new low which stands until 659.

==== 444 ====
444 is the largest known n for which there is a unique integer solution to a_{1}+...+a_{n}=(a_{1})...(a_{n}) with a_{1}≤a_{2}≤...≤a_{n}.

==== 445 ====
445 = 5 × 89. There are 445 series-reduced trees with 17 nodes.

==== 446 ====
446 = 2 × 223. It is a nontotient and a self number.

==== 447 ====
447 = 3 × 149. There are 447 1's in all partitions of 22 into odd parts.

==== 448 ====
448 = 2^{6} × 7. It is an untouchable number, a refactorable number, and a Harshad number.

==== 449 ====
449 is a prime number, a Chen prime, a Proth prime, an Eisenstein prime with no imaginary part, and the sum of five consecutive primes (79 + 83 + 89 + 97 + 101).

449! is the largest factorial less than 10^{1000}.

=== 450s ===
==== 450 ====
450 = 2 × 3^{2} × 5^{2}. It is a nontotient, a refactorable number, a Harshad number, and the sum of totient function for the first 38 integers.

==== 451 ====
451 = 11 × 41. It is a Wedderburn–Etherington number and a centered decagonal number. It is the smallest number whose reciprocal has period 10.

==== 452 ====
452 = 2^{2} × 113. There are 452 surface-points of a tetrahedron with edge-length 15.

==== 453 ====
453 = 3 × 151. It is a Blum integer.

==== 454 ====
454 = 2 × 227. It is a nontotient and a Smith number.

==== 455 ====
455 = 5 × 7 × 13. It is a sphenic number and a tetrahedral number.

The sum of the squares of the first 455 primes is divisible by 455.

==== 456 ====
456 = 2^{3} × 3 × 19. It is a centered pentagonal number, an icosahedral number, the sum of a pair of twin primes (227 + 229), and the sum of four consecutive primes (107 + 109 + 113 + 127).

It is one of the two values of the magical formula, IPSOS, the other being 696.

==== 457 ====
457 is a prime number, a self number, and the sum of three consecutive primes (149 + 151 + 157).

==== 458 ====
458 = 2 × 229. It is a nontotient. There are 458partitions of 24 into divisors of 24.

==== 459 ====
459 = 3^{3} × 17. It is a triangular matchstick number.

=== 460s ===
==== 460 ====
460 = 2^{2} × 5 × 23. It is a centered triangular number, a dodecagonal number, a Harshad number, and the sum of twelve consecutive primes (17 + 19 + 23 + 29 + 31 + 37 + 41 + 43 + 47 + 53 + 59 + 61).

==== 461 ====
461 is a prime number, a Chen prime, a sexy prime with 467, an Eisenstein prime with no imaginary part, and a prime index prime.

==== 462 ====
462 = 2 × 3 × 7 × 11. Itis a pronic number, a sparsely totient number, an idoneal number, a stirling number of the second kind $\left\{ {9 \atop 7} \right\}$ , the binomial coefficient $\tbinom {11}5$, and the sum of six consecutive primes (67 + 71 + 73 + 79 + 83 + 89).

==== 463 ====
463 is a prime number, a centered heptagonal number, sum of seven consecutive primes (53 + 59 + 61 + 67 + 71 + 73 + 79). It is the first of seven consecutive primes that are one less than a multiple of 4 (from 463 to 503).

It is a common baseball double play (see baseball positions).

There are 463 days in the synodic period of Ceres.

==== 464 ====
464 = 2^{4} × 29. It is a primitive abundant number. and the maximal number of pieces that can be obtained by cutting an annulus with 29 cuts. Since 464 = 21^{2} + 21 + 2, it is the maximum number of regions into which 22 intersecting circles divide the plane.

==== 465 ====
465 = 3 × 5 × 31. It is a sphenic number, a member of the Padovan sequence, a Harshad number, and the 30th triangular number.

==== 466 ====
466 = 2 × 233. It is a noncototient and a lazy caterer number.

==== 467 ====
467 is a prime number, a safe prime, a sexy prime with 461, a Chen prime, and an Eisenstein prime with no imaginary part.

$\sum_{n=0}^{10}{467}^{n}$ is prime

==== 468 ====
468 = 2^{2} × 3^{2} × 13. It is a refactorable number, a self number, a Harshad number and the sum of ten consecutive primes (29 + 31 + 37 + 41 + 43 + 47 + 53 + 59 + 61 + 67).

==== 469 ====
469 = 7 × 67. It is a centered hexagonal number.

469! - 1 is prime.

=== 470s ===
==== 470 ====
470 = 2 × 5 × 47. It is a sphenic number, a nontotient, a noncototient, and a cake number.

==== 471 ====
471 = 3 × 157.It is the sum of three consecutive primes (151 + 157 + 163).

It is a perfect totient number, additionally, φ(471) = φ(σ(471)).

==== 472 ====
472 = 2^{3} × 59. It is a nontotient, an untouchable number, and a refactorable number. There are 472 distinct ways to cut a 5 × 5 square into squares with integer sides.

==== 473 ====
473 = 11 × 43. It is a Blum integer and the sum of five consecutive primes (83 + 89 + 97 + 101 + 103).

==== 474 ====
474 = 2 × 3 × 79. It is a sphenic number, a nontotient, a noncototient, an untouchable number, a nonagonal number, the sum of the totient function for first 39 integers, and the sum of eight consecutive primes (43 + 47 + 53 + 59 + 61 + 67 + 71 + 73).

==== 475 ====
475 = 5^{2} × 19. It is a 49-gonal number and a member of the Mian–Chowla sequence.

==== 476 ====
476 = 2^{2} × 7 × 17. It is a Harshad number and an admirable number because it equals the sum of its proper divisors after subtracting one of them instead of adding it.

==== 477 ====
477 = 3^{2} × 53. It is a pentagonal number.

==== 478 ====
478 = 2 × 239. It is a Companion Pell number. There are 478 partitions of 26 that do not contain 1 as a part.

==== 479 ====
479 is a prime number, a safe prime, a Chen prime, an Eisenstein prime with no imaginary part, a self number, and the sum of nine consecutive primes (37 + 41 + 43 + 47 + 53 + 59 + 61 + 67 + 71).

=== 480s ===
==== 480 ====
480 = 2^{5} × 3 × 5. It is a highly totient number, a refactorable number, a Harshad number, a largely composite number, the sum of a twin prime pair (239 + 241), and the sum of four consecutive primes (109 + 113 + 127 + 131).

$\sum_{n=0}^{10}{480}^{n}$ is prime

==== 481 ====
481 = 13 × 37. It is an octagonal number, a centered square number, and a Harshad number.

==== 482 ====
482 = 2 × 241. It is a nontotient and a noncototient. There are 482 series-reduced planted trees with 15 nodes.

==== 483 ====
483 = 3 × 7 × 23. It is a sphenic number and a Smith number.

==== 484 ====
484 = 2^{2} × 11^{2} = 22^{2}. It is a palindromic square and a nontotient.

==== 485 ====
485 = 5 × 97. There are 485 triangles (of all sizes, including holes) in Sierpiński's triangle after 5 inscriptions

==== 486 ====
486 = 2 × 3^{5}. It is a Harshad number and a Perrin number.

==== 487 ====
It is a prime number, a Chen prime, and the sum of three consecutive primes (157 + 163 + 167).

The only primes under 7.74 × 10^{13} that divide their own decimal repetends are 3, 487, and 56598313.

==== 488 ====
488 = 2^{3} × 61. It is a nontotient and a refactorable number. There are 488 surface points on a cube with edge-length 10.

φ(488) = φ(σ(488)),

==== 489 ====
489 = 3 × 163. It is an octahedral number.

=== 490s ===
==== 490 ====
490 = 2 × 5 × 7^{2}. It is a noncototient, a self number, and the sum of the totient function for the first 40 integers. There are 490 integer partitions of 19.

A (possibly arbitrary) large number in the Christian Gospel of Matthew. In Matthew 18:21–35, Jesus tells the Parable of the Unforgiving Servant, instructing Peter to forgive his brother "seventy times seven" times when his brother sins against him .

==== 491 ====
491 is a prime number, an isolated prime, a Sophie Germain prime, a Chen prime, an Eisenstein prime with no imaginary part, and a strictly non-palindromic number.

==== 492 ====
492 = 2^{2} × 3 × 41. It is a refactorable number and the sum of six consecutive primes (71 + 73 + 79 + 83 + 89 + 97). It forms a Ruth–Aaron pair with 493 under first definition.

==== 493 ====
493 = 17 × 29. It is the sum of seven consecutive primes (59 + 61 + 67 + 71 + 73 + 79 + 83). It forms a Ruth–Aaron pair with 492 under first definition. The 493d centered octagonal number is also a centered square number.

==== 494 ====
494 = 2 × 13 × 19 = $\left\langle \!\! \left\langle {8 \atop 1} \right\rangle \!\! \right\rangle$. It is a sphenic number and a nontotient.

==== 497 ====
497 = 7 × 71. It is a lazy caterer number and the sum of five consecutive primes (89 + 97 + 101 + 103 + 107).

==== 498 ====
498 = 2 × 3 × 83. It is a sphenic number, an untouchable number, an admirable number, and an abundant number

==== 499 ====
499 is a prime number, an isolated prime, and a Chen prime.

- 4^{499} - 3^{499} is prime.
