= XIC =

XIC can stand for:

- Examination in Chief
- The number of the beast or 616
- In Eastern Greek XIC is chi-iota-sigma, or 616 (number)
- X-inactivation center, a part of female X chromosome
- Xichang Qingshan Airport, which has IATA code of "XIC"
- Extracted Ion Chromatogram, a representation of data in hyphenated mass spectrometry/chromatography
