= Number of the Beast =

The number of the beast, 666 in most manuscripts, is associated with the Beast of Revelation in the Book of Revelation in the Bible.

Number of the Beast may also refer to:

- The Number of the Beast (album), 1982, by Iron Maiden
  - "The Number of the Beast" (song), from the album
- The Number of the Beast (play), a 1982 drama by Snoo Wilson about Aleister Crowley
- Number of the Beast (comics), a comic book limited series
- The Number of the Beast (novel), by Robert Heinlein (1980)

== See also ==
- "The Number of the Beast Is 666" (Hannibal), an episode of the TV series
- The Number of the Beast is 666, one of The Great Red Dragon paintings by William Blake
- Mark of the Beast (disambiguation)
- 616 (number)#Number of the beast, another interpretation of the number of the beast
