= Refused (album) =

Compilation album by The Residents
- Released: December 15, 1999
- Recorded: 1972–1999
- Genres: Avant-garde; experimental rock
- Label: Ralph America
- Producer: The Cryptic Corporation

The Residents chronology
| Wormwood Live (1999) | Refused (1999) | Icky Flix (2001) |

Refused, also known as Santa Dog '99, is an album released on CD by the Residents in 1999 to celebrate the end of the millennium. It collects the 1972 Santa Dog EP as well as every rerecording of the title track (also known as "Fire") that had been made up to that point, as well as new recordings made especially for the album. It was originally released by Ralph America in a limited run of 1333 copies (in reference to the Number of the Beast, given that 1999 minus 1333 equals 666).

The album cover shows Richard Nixon's refused copy of the original EP, which was mailed to him alongside other celebrities and close friends by the Residents.

The track "Santa Dog '84 (A Work in Progress)" is a new version of the original, although still incomplete, with overdubs and vocals by Molly Harvey and Carla Fabrizio.

== Track listing ==
All tracks are written by The Residents.

| No. | Title | Length |
|---|---|---|
| 1. | "Santa Dog '84 (unfinished) (a work in progress)" | 3:05 |
| 2. | "Fire" | 1:45 |
| 3. | "Lightning" | 3:19 |
| 4. | "Explosion" | 2:17 |
| 5. | "Aircraft Damage" | 3:51 |
| 6. | "Flood" | 2:43 |
| 7. | "Santa Dog '78 (Fire)" | 1:53 |
| 8. | "Famine" | 0:45 |
| 9. | "Santa Dog '88" | 5:15 |
| 10. | "Plague" | 1:36 |
| 11. | "Santa Dog NYE (live)" | 3:44 |
| 12. | "Pestilence" | 4:09 |
| 13. | "Where are your Dogs? Show us your Ugly!" | 12:55 |
| 14. | "Fire '99 / Santa Dog 2nd Millennium" | 9:52 |

=== 2019 Klanggalerie reissue ===
The album was rearranged and rereleased in 2019 on CD by Klanggalerie to commemorate the 20th anniversary of Refused. It excludes the other three tracks from the 1972 EP but includes all subsequent rerecordings made since the release of the original album, as well as the original "Santa Dog '84" and an instrumental of "Santa Dog '88" titled "Santa Cow".

| No. | Title | Length |
|---|---|---|
| 1. | "Fire" | 1:45 |
| 2. | "Santa Dog '78" | 1:53 |
| 3. | "Santa Dog '84 (original version)" | 2:56 |
| 4. | "Santa Dog '84 (unfinished - a work in progress)" | 2:59 |
| 5. | "Santa Dog '88" | 5:14 |
| 6. | "Santa Dog NYE (live on New Year's Eve 1989)" | 3:39 |
| 7. | "Santa Dog '92" | 12:52 |
| 8. | "Famine" | 0:46 |
| 9. | "Pestilence" | 4:07 |
| 10. | "Flood" | 2:44 |
| 11. | "Plague" | 1:37 |
| 12. | "Fire '99 / Santa Dog 2nd Millennium" | 9:54 |
| 13. | "Santa Dog 2006" | 2:46 |
| 14. | "Santa Dog 2012" | 6:05 |
| 15. | "Santa Dog 2017" | 4:36 |
| 16. | "Santa Dog for Gamelan Orchestra" | 5:13 |
| 17. | "Santa Cow" | 5:08 |
| 18. | "Santa Dog (Live 2013)" | 4:00 |

=== 2022 Secret Records reissue ===
The album was once again rearranged and rereleased in 2022 on 2xLP by Secret Records as Santa Dog 50th Anniversary Collection (aka Refused) to commemorate the 50th anniversary of Santa Dog.

Side A
| No. | Title | Length |
|---|---|---|
| 1. | "Fire" | 1:45 |
| 2. | "Explosion" | 2:18 |
| 3. | "Lightning" | 3:20 |
| 4. | "Aircraft Damage" | 3:50 |
| 5. | "Santa Dog '78" | 1:53 |
| 6. | "Santa Dog '84" | 2:55 |

Side B
| No. | Title | Length |
|---|---|---|
| 7. | "Santa Dog '88" | 5:13 |
| 8. | "Where are your Dogs? Show us your Ugly!" | 12:51 |
| 9. | "Flood" | 2:42 |

Side C
| No. | Title | Length |
|---|---|---|
| 10. | "Famine" | 0:44 |
| 11. | "Santa Dog '84-'99 (A work in progress)" | 2:58 |
| 12. | "Plague" | 1:38 |
| 13. | "Pestilence" | 4:08 |
| 14. | "Fire '99 / Santa Dog 2nd Millennium" | 9:52 |

Side D
| No. | Title | Length |
|---|---|---|
| 15. | "Santa Dog for Gamelan Orchestra" | 5:12 |
| 16. | "Santa Dog 2006" | 2:46 |
| 17. | "Santa Dog 2012" | 6:04 |
| 18. | "Santa Dog 2017" | 4:36 |
