= Ought =

Ought may refer to:

- One of the English modal verbs
- One of the names for the number 0 in English
- Ought (band), a Montreal post-punk band on the Canadian Constellation Records
- The 2000s, also called the "aughts" or "oughts"

== See also ==
- Is–ought problem
- Categorical imperative
- Nought
