= Mark of the Beast =

The mark of the beast is a mark associated with the Beast of Revelation.

Mark of the Beast may also refer to:

== Film ==
- Mark of the Beast (film), a 1923 American silent drama film
- The Mark of the Beast (film), a 1980 Dutch drama film
- Mark of the Beast, the working title of the 1981 American horror film Fear No Evil
- The Mark of the Beast, a 1997 Canadian Christian documentary film by Cloud Ten Pictures

== Music ==
- Mark of the Beast (Manilla Road album), 2002
- Mark of the Beast (Devil Doll album), 1988
- Mark of the Beast, a 2004 video album by Lord Belial
- Mark of the Beast, a 2011 mixtape by Napoleon of Wu-Syndicate

== Other uses ==
- The Mark of the Beast, an 1890 short story by Rudyard Kipling

== See also ==
- Number of the Beast (disambiguation)
