= Andreas Helwig =

German classical scholar and linguist

Andreas Helwig (Helwich, Helvigius) (1572–1643) was a German classical scholar and linguist. His Origines dictionum germanicarum (1622) was a pioneer etymological work of the German language.

== Life ==
Helwig was rector of the University of Berlin from 1611 to 1614, then professor of poetry from 1614 to 1616. Subsequently he taught at the Gymnasium at Stralsund.

== Works ==
In 1602 he published a Greek etymological dictionary. In his period at Berlin, he published Antichristus Romanus, an anti-papal work including the numerical formula identifying Vicarius Filii Dei, an alleged title of the Pope, reduced to its Roman numerals and summed to 666. Brady mentions a theory of Johann Christoph Wolf that Helwig had already published this observation in an anonymous work of 1600.

Such cryptograms were not uncommon; Brady comments on (from Richard Bernard's Key of Knowledge of 1617) the phrase Generalis Dei Vicarius in Terris likewise treated, and Thomas Beard’s 1625 permutation Vicarius Dei Generalis in Terris, perhaps influenced by Helwig. This became Vicarius Dei Generalis in Terris with Hezekiah Holland in 1650. But interest in Helwig’s formulation has outlasted the others.
