= Vicarius Filii Dei =

Phrase referring to Saint Peter

Vicarius Filii Dei (Latin: Vicarivs translates to "substitute; supplying the place of someone" "Filii" is of son and "Dei" is of God...literal translation is substitute of son of god) is a phrase first used in the forged medieval Donation of Constantine to refer to Saint Peter, who is regarded as the first Pope by the Catholic Church.

== Origins and uses of the phrase ==
The earliest known instance of the phrase Vicarius Filii Dei is in the Donation of Constantine, now dated between the eighth and the ninth centuries AD.

... utile iudicavimus una cum omnibus nostris satrapibus et universo senatu, optimatibus etiam et cuncto populo Romano, gloriae imperii nostri subiacenti, ut, sicut in terris vicarius filii dei esse videtur constitutus, etiam et pontifices, qui ipsius principis apostolorum gerunt vices, principatus potestatem amplius, quam terrena imperialis nostrae serenitatis mansuetudo habere videtur concessam, a nobis nostroque imperio obtineant; eligentes nobis ipsum principem apostolorum vel eius vicarios firmos apud deum adesse patronos.

In English, it says, "It goes to all the people who are subject to the glory of the Roman Empire, so that just as on earth he seems to be the vicar of the Son of God, so also the pontiffs are appointed."

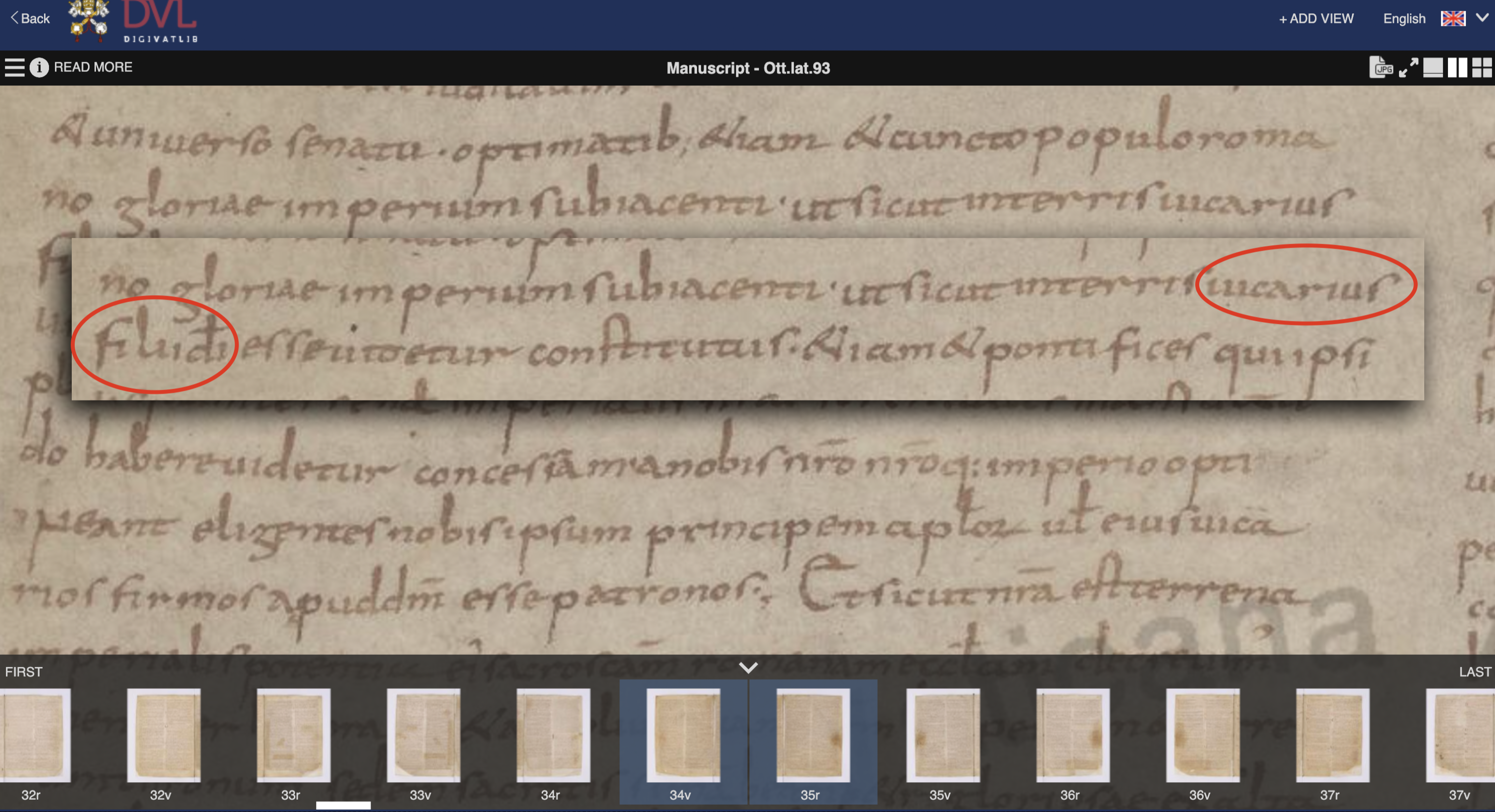
Ott.lat.93 Folio 35r Pseudo-Isidore Decretals Donation of Constantine at the Biblioteca Apostolica Vaticana

Johann Peter Kirsch states that "many of the recent critical students of the document [i.e. Donation of Constantine] locate its composition at Rome and attribute the forgery to an ecclesiastic, their chief argument being an intrinsic one: this false document was composed in favour of the popes and of the Holy Catholic Roman Church, therefore the Christ Church itself must have had the chief interest in a forgery executed for a purpose so clearly expressed".

However, it goes on to state, "Grauert, for whom the forger is a Frankish subject, shares the view of Hergenröther, i.e. the forger had in mind a defence of the new Western Empire from the attacks of the Eastern Romans. Therefore it was highly important for him to establish the legitimacy of the newly founded empire, and this purpose was especially aided by all that the document alleges concerning the elevation of the pope."

Despite the Donation later being recognized as a forgery, initially the whistleblower Laurentius Valla who discovered the forgery had his work suppressed by the Index Librorum Prohibitorum

Gratian included the phrase in his "Decretum" in Distinctio 96 chapter 14. The title was also included in some collections of Greek canons. Though it was derived from a forgery (The Donation of Constantine) and some have said it carried no dogmatic or canonical authority, Protestants pointed to the weight and authority proscribed within Gratian's Decretal Distinctio 19 Chapter 6 which stated that the decretal epistles were reckoned part of the canonical scriptures. It was previously also used as such for hundreds of years in the past.

=== Documented Usage ===
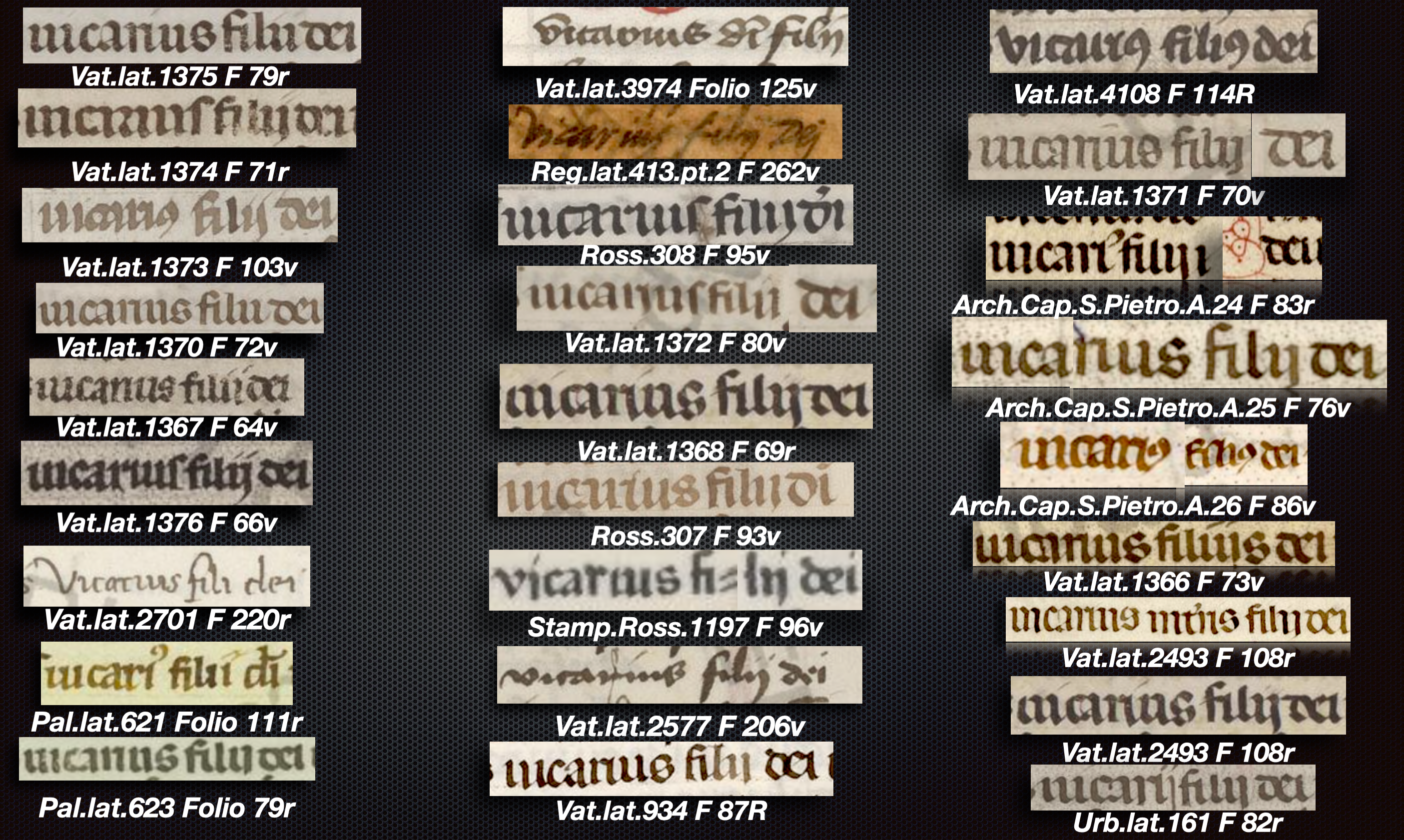
VFD usage at the Biblioteca Apostolica Vaticana including Canon law, Apostolic Constitutions and Papal Letters, with MS references and folio pagination

Several popes used the phrase and quoted it throughout their documents including the following:

- Pope Leo IX in his In Terra Pax Hominibus, 1054
- Pope Nicholaus IV in his letter to Caydonius the Tartar, 1289
- Pope John XXII in his Licet juxta doctrinam, 1327
- Pope John XXII in his Bulla Sabbatina, 1322
- Pope Paul VI in his Rivi Muniensis, 1965 and in his Bafianae, 1968

==== Lawyers ====
Catholic documents used the phrase as well including those from Canon Lawyer Augustinus Triumphus in his Summa de potestate ecclesiastica. Others such as Venetian lawyer Alphonsus Alvarez Guerrero, a Spanish civil and canon lawyer (1559) used the phrase in his Thesaurus Christianae Religiones. Venetian jureconsult and author (16th century) Giovanni Battista Ziletti (1577) also used the phrase in his work Consiliorum Seu Responsorum, Ad Causas Criminales, Recens Editorum

==== Cardinals and Bishops ====
In 1561 Dominican and Spanish theologian Juan de Torquemada used the phrase in his monumental Summa de Ecclesia. In 1581, Antonino (Archbishop of Florence) in Volume 3 of his Summa Theologicae quotes the phrase and applies it to the pope. The acclaimed Cardinal Henry Edward Manning used an English equivalent "Vicar of the Son of God" to refer to the pope. In his "Vindication of the Popes against opponents of all kinds" Vindiciae Summorum Pontificum adversus omnis generis adversarios, Wilibald Heiss (1755) also used the title. Jesuit Vincent Houdry also used the title in his work Bibliotheca Concionatoria Complectens Panegyricas Orationes Sanctorum where he described the win of Innocent II over antipope Anaclectus II

==== Ecclesiastical Anthology ====
In his Polyanthea Sacrorum, Giovanni Paolo Paravicini and also Laurentius Brancati in his Epitome Canonum Omnium, enumerated papal names or claims to authority and stated that the "Papa Est Vicarius Filii Dei Sicut Petris" "The Pope is Vicarius Filii Dei like Peter". Wolfgang Frölich in his 1790 work (Who is Peter) Quis est Petrus seu qualis Petri Primatus?: Liber theologico-canonico catholicus described Peter's successor with the phrase "Christi Filii Dei Vicarius". The French catechism Catéchisme de persévérance, also used the French version of the title "vicaire du Fils de Dieu". Italian Franciscan canonist Lucius Ferraris also used the title in his Prompta Bibliotheca Canonica, Juridica, Moralis. Theologian D'Utrecht in his work Défense de L'Eglise Romaine et des Souverains Pontifes also used the title.

=== Papal title? ===
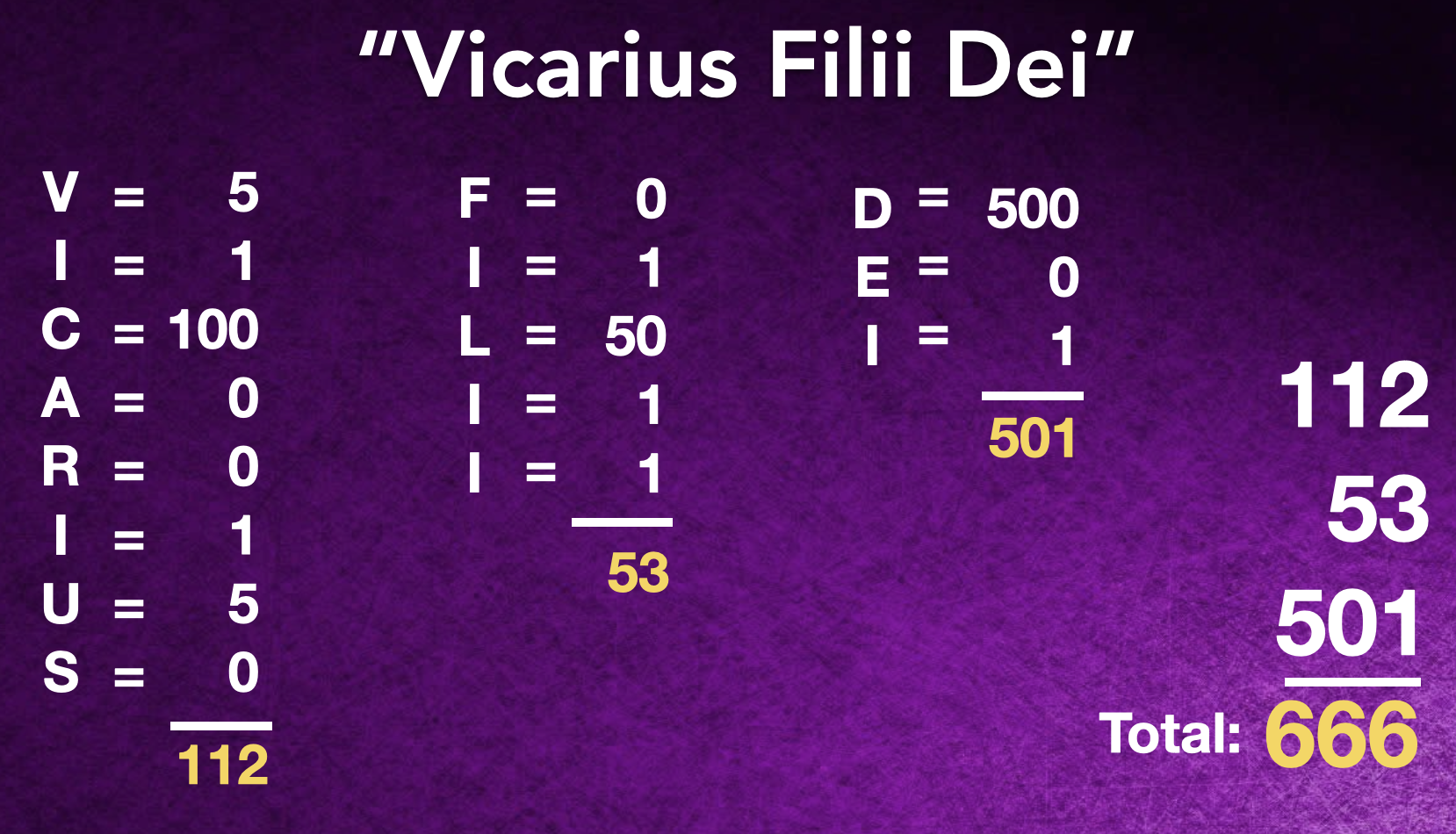
A depiction of the gematria principle employed by Andreas Helwig in 1612.

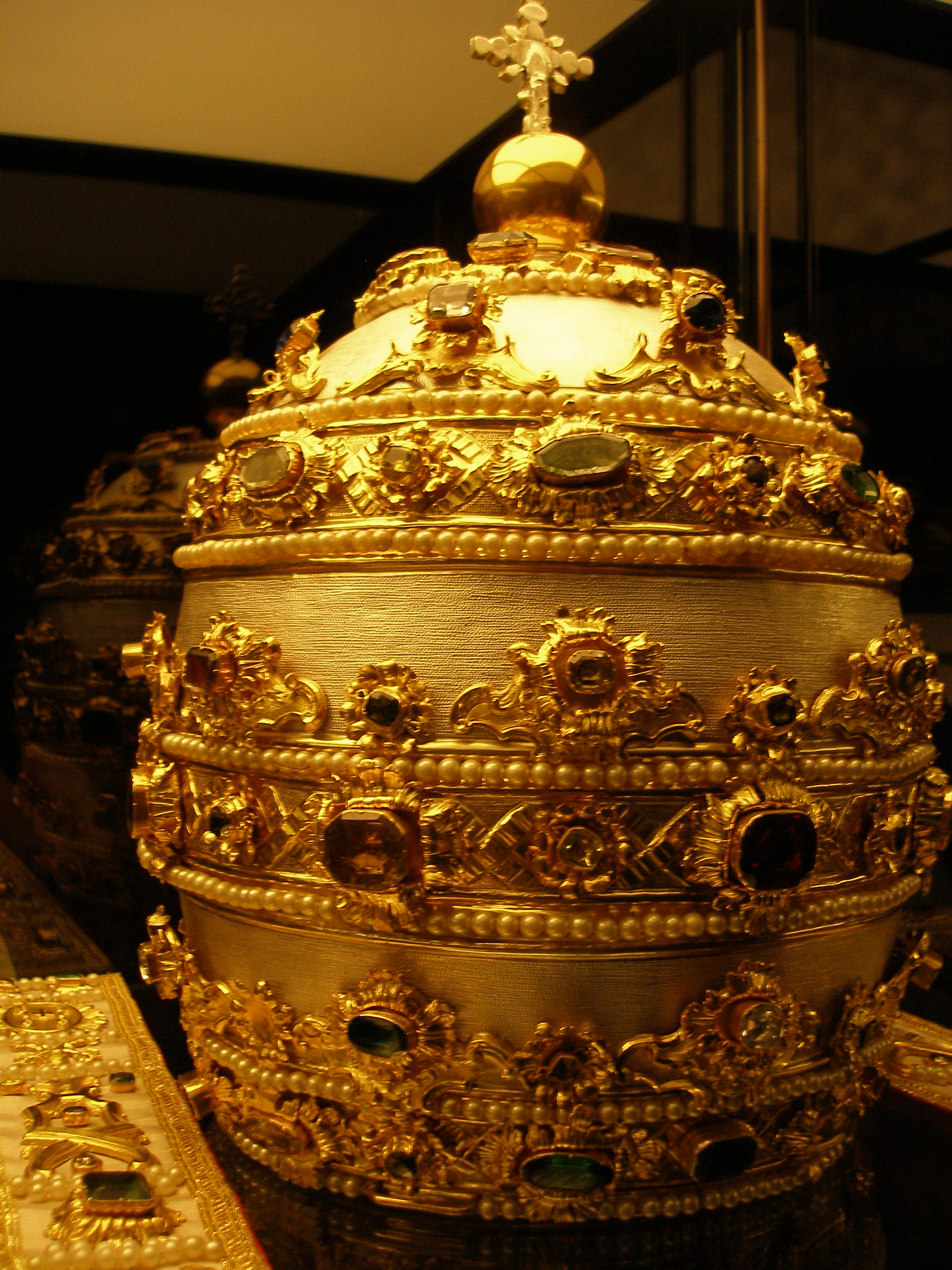
An example of a papal tiara.

The Protestant writer Andreas Helwig suggested that Vicarius Filii Dei was an expansion of the historical title Vicarius Christi, rather than an official title used by the Popes themselves. His interpretation did not become common until about the time of the French Revolution. Some later Protestant figures asserted that Vicarius Filii Dei was an official title of the Pope, with some saying that this title appeared on the papal tiara and/or a mitre. Some Catholic converts to Protestantism such as Balthasar Hoffman also testified to witnessing the title engraved with 100 diamonds on the 1845 tiara of Gregory XVI.

Catholic apologist Patrick Madrid answers the Protestant assertions by claiming that Vicarius Filii Dei has never been an official Papal title. Catholics answer the claims that "Vicarius Filii Dei" is written on the Papal Tiara by stating that a simple inspection of the more than 20 papal tiaras still in existence—including those in use in 1866 during the reign of Pope Pius IX when Uriah Smith made his claim—shows that none have this inscription, nor is there any evidence that any of the earlier papal tiaras destroyed by invading French troops in 1798 had it. However, a Catholic publication, Our Sunday Visitor, did admit to the title being inscribed on a tiara. Catholic scholar, professor emeritus at the Catholic University of America, Dr Johannes Quasten (1900–1987), stated that "The title Vicarius Filii Dei as well as the title vicarius christi is very common as the title of the pope".

== Protestant view ==
Some fundamentalist Protestants have the view that Vicarius Filii Dei can be applied to the Bishop of Rome.

=== Origins of a controversy ===
The earliest extant record of a Protestant writer on this subject is that of Professor Andreas Helwig in 1612. In his work Antichristus Romanus he took fifteen titles in Hebrew, Greek, and Latin and computed their numerical equivalents using the principle of Isopsephy in those languages, arriving at the number 666 mentioned in the Book of Revelation. Out of all these titles, he preferred to single out Vicarius Filii Dei, for the reason that it met "all the conditions which [Cardinal] Bellarmine had thus far demanded."

Helwig's criteria were as follows:

1. must yield the required number
2. must agree with the papal order
3. must not be a vile name applied by enemies, but acceptable to Antichrist himself
4. must be one of which he can boast.

Helwig suggested that the supposed title was an expansion of the historical title Vicarius Christi, rather than an official title used by the Popes themselves. Additionally, he said nothing about the title appearing on tiaras or mitres. Helwig's interpretation did not become a common one until about the time of the French Revolution. Some later Protestant figures directly claimed that Vicarius Filii Dei was an official title of the Roman Catholic Pope, some claimed that this title appeared on the papal tiara and/or a mitre.

Some Protestants view the Pope as the Antichrist. This view was common at the time of Helwig and is still part of the confession of faith of some Protestant churches, such as those within Confessional Lutheranism and the London Baptist confession of 1689.

=== Historical Seventh-day Adventist views ===
In 1866, Uriah Smith was the first to propose the interpretation to the Seventh-day Adventist Church. In The United States in the Light of Prophecy, he wrote: "The pope wears upon his pontifical crown in jeweled letters, this title: 'Vicarius Filii Dei', 'Viceregent of the Son of God'; the numerical value of which title is just six hundred and sixty-six. The most plausible supposition we have ever seen on this point is that here we find the number in question. It is the number of the beast, the papacy; it is the number of his name, for he adopts it as his distinctive title; it is the number of a man, for he who bears it is the 'man of sin'."

Uriah Smith maintained his interpretation in the various editions of Thoughts on Daniel and the Revelation, which was influential in the church.

In November 1948, Le Roy Froom, a Seventh-day Adventist ministerial leader, editor of the church's Ministry, and a church historian, wrote an article to correct the mistaken use of some of the denomination's evangelists who continued to claim that the Latin words "Vicarius Filii Dei" were written on a papal tiara.

Each pope, like any other sovereign, has his own tiara, which is the papal crown. There is, therefore, no one tiara that is worn by the full succession of papal pontiffs. Moreover, personal examination of these various tiaras, by different men back through the years, and a scrutiny of the pictures of many more, have failed to disclose one engraved with the inscription Vicarius Filii Dei ... As heralds of truth, we are to proclaim the truth truthfully. No fabrication should ever becloud our presentation of truth. The present truth of the threefold message [the Three Angels' Messages of Revelation 14] is so overwhelming in its logical appeal, and so inescapable in its claims, that it needs no dubious evidence or illustration to support it.

Froom also stated in the 1948 article that at one point a prominent Adventist went to Rome to take some pictures of the papal tiaras, but "the photographs were without any wording of any sort on any one of the three crown, front or back." Later, an Adventist artist who wanted to illustrate a standard Adventist text on prophecies added the words "Vicarius", "Filii", and "Dei", one word on each of the three tiaras in the photograph taken. He submitted his image for publishing in a standard church text on Bible prophecy; the image was to serve as an illustration in the book, not as a visual proof. However, when an Adventist publishing house and the Adventist General Conference received it, they "emphatically rejected it as misleading and deceptive, and refused to allow its use. (All honor to them!)." Froom concluded his 1948 article with the following words: "Truth does not need fabrication to aid or support it. Its very nature precludes any manipulation or duplicity. We cannot afford to be party to any fraud. The reflex action upon our own souls should be a sufficient deterrent. We must never use a quotation or a picture merely because it sounds or looks impressive. We must honor the truth, and meticulously observe the principle of honesty in the handling of evidence under all circumstances."

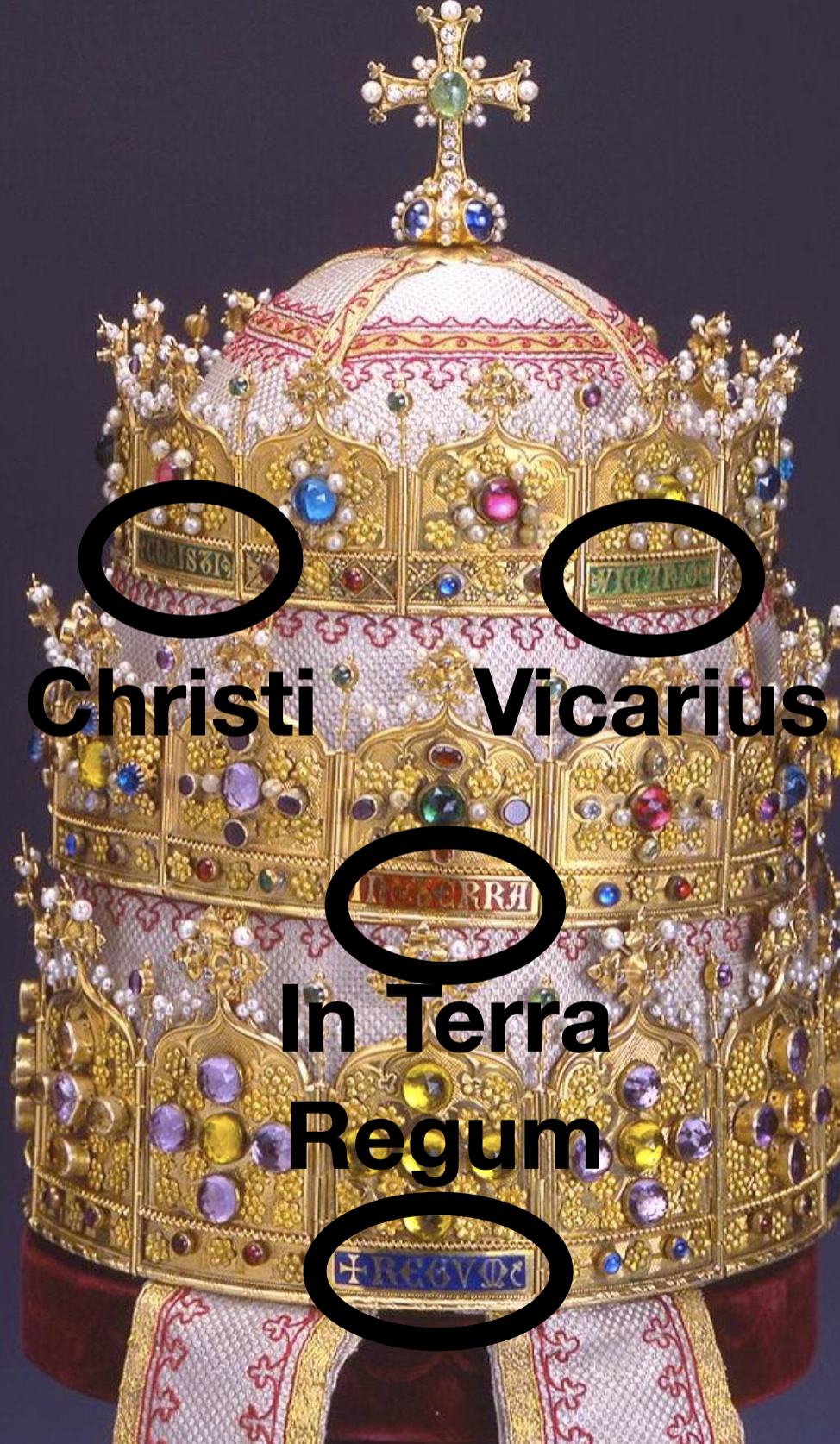
The Belgian Tiara Designed by Jean-Baptiste Bethune of Ghent was offered as a gift by Queen Maria-Hendrika of the Belgians to Pope Pius IX in 1871.

It is worth noting however that the equivalent title "Vicarius Christi" is indeed known to be inscribed upon the Belgium Tiara given to Pope Pius IX on 18 June 1871 by the Ladies of the Royal Court of the King of the Belgians and designed by Jean Baptist Bethune of Ghent. Adventists have proposed that the alternate "Vicarius Christi" is no better than Vicarius Filii Dei, because of the correlation in Leviticus 24:18 between the substitute Vicarium in the Vulgate and the substitute ἀντί "life for life" in the Greek text. They have proposed Vicarius Christi therefore means "Antichrist".

=== Catholic response ===
Catholic apologist Patrick Madrid answers the Protestant claims by claiming that "Vicarius Filii Dei" has never been an official Papal title. He also argues that even if it were a Papal title, that would not be sufficient to associate the Pope with the number of the Beast, as, for example, the name of Ellen Gould White can also be similarly manipulated to get the same number (ELLen GoVLD VVhIte 50+50+5+50+500+5+5+1=666). He answers the claims that "Vicarius Filii Dei" is not written on Papal Tiara by stating that merely looking at any of the more than 20 papal tiaras still in existence—including those in use in 1866 during the reign of Pope Pius IX when Uriah Smith made his claim—plainly shows that not even one of them has any such inscription, nor is there any evidence that any of the earlier papal tiaras destroyed by invading French troops in 1798 had any such inscription either.

Adventist Samuele Bacchiocchi responded to those claims, by pointing out that "interpreting 666 on the basis of the numerical values of the letters of names can give absurd results". He also notes the Donation of Constantine was considered as true to the point "this forged document was used by 10 popes over a period of six centuries to assert, not only their ecclesiastical supremacy over all the churches, but also their political sovereignty over what became known the Papal States, which included most of Italy." He also states the title "Vicarius Filii Dei" was considered as an official title of the pope.

== See also ==
- Chronogram
- Vicar of Jesus Christ
