= Vicar of Christ =

Christian term

Vicar of Christ (Latin: Vicarius Christi) is a term used in different ways and with different theological connotations throughout history. The original notion of a vicar is as an "earthly representative of Christ", but it is also used in the sense of "person acting as parish priest in place of a real parson." The title is now used in Catholicism to refer to the bishops, and more specifically, was historically used to refer to the Bishop of Rome (the pope).

== History and different uses ==
During the history of Christianity, the title of Vicar of Christ was used in different ways, with implications for theological, pastoral or different time.

=== Use for the bishops ===
An early appearance of a similar concept of the Vicar of Christ is mentioned in the Epistle to the Magnesians of St. Ignatius, Bishop of Antioch (who was possibly a disciple of both John the Apostle and Saint Peter), written between the years AD 88 and 107, which states: "your bishop presides in the place of God". Although Ignatius did not explicitly use the term Vicar of Christ, he sets out the concept, with regard to local bishops. More recently, the Second Vatican Council's Dogmatic Constitution on the Church Lumen gentium noted that bishops are "vicars and ambassadors of Christ", and the Catechism of the Catholic Church notes that each bishop governs his diocese "[a]s Christ's vicar".

The first recorded use of the term "Vicar of Christ" is found in the epistles of Tertullian in the late 2nd and early 3rd centuries, referring to the Holy Spirit, that is, as Christ is not physically performing miracles in the Church, the Holy Spirit acts as his Vicar on his behalf, performing miracles and protecting the Church from error. Other roles Tertullian attributed to the Holy Spirit as Vicar were: the direction of discipline, the revelation of the Scriptures, the reformation of the intellect, and the advancement toward the "better things".

=== Use for the popes ===
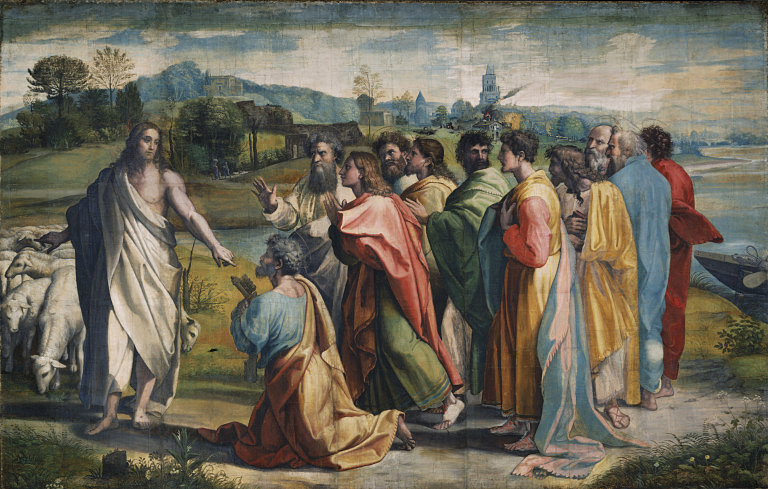
Christ's Charge to Peter by Raphael, 1515. Catholics believe that in telling Peter to feed his sheep, Christ was entrusting to the papacy the responsibility of caring for the Church.

The third use of the term Vicar of Christ appears in the 5th century, in a synod of bishops to refer to Pope Gelasius I. The theological connotations of the title got a pastoral sense, evoking the words of Christ to the Apostle Peter, regarded by the first Catholic Pope in John 21:16-17, "Feed my lambs [...] Feed my sheep". Catholics interpret this as Christ making Peter his vicar and pastor with the responsibility to feed his flock (i.e. the Church) in his own place.

However, the use of the title to refer to the popes in the early Church was unstable, and several variants of the use of Vicar were used for the Pope, as "Vicar of Peter", indicating that they were the successors of St. Peter, "Vicar of the Prince of the Apostles" or "Vicar of the Apostolic See", among other variants. This title is used by the Roman Missal in their prayers for a dead pope, and the oath of allegiance to St. Boniface to Pope Gregory II. Since 1200, Popes have consistently used this title. Insisting that he—and he alone—had the right to remove bishops from office, Pope Innocent III appealed to the title of Vicar of Christ. Occasionally, popes like Nicholas III used "Vicar of God" as an equivalent title. The 2012 edition of the Annuario Pontificio gives "Vicar of Jesus Christ" as the second official title of the Pope (the first being "Bishop of Rome"). The edition of the same book published on March 25, 2020, included the title of "Vicar of Christ" to the section "Historical titles" section, to indicate its bond with the history of the papacy.

=== Use in caesaropapism ===
Another use of the title, with a different meaning, appeared in the Eastern Churches between the fifth and sixth centuries. The term was used to refer to the Byzantine emperor, showing the apex of caesaropapism, though decisions on doctrine, liturgy and spirituality were left to the bishops.

== See also ==
- Supreme Governor of the Church of England, the closest Anglican equivalent
- Vicarius Filii Dei, exclusively for Saint Peter
- Papal titles
