= Papyrus 115 =

Papyrus 𝔓^{115}
- New Testament manuscript
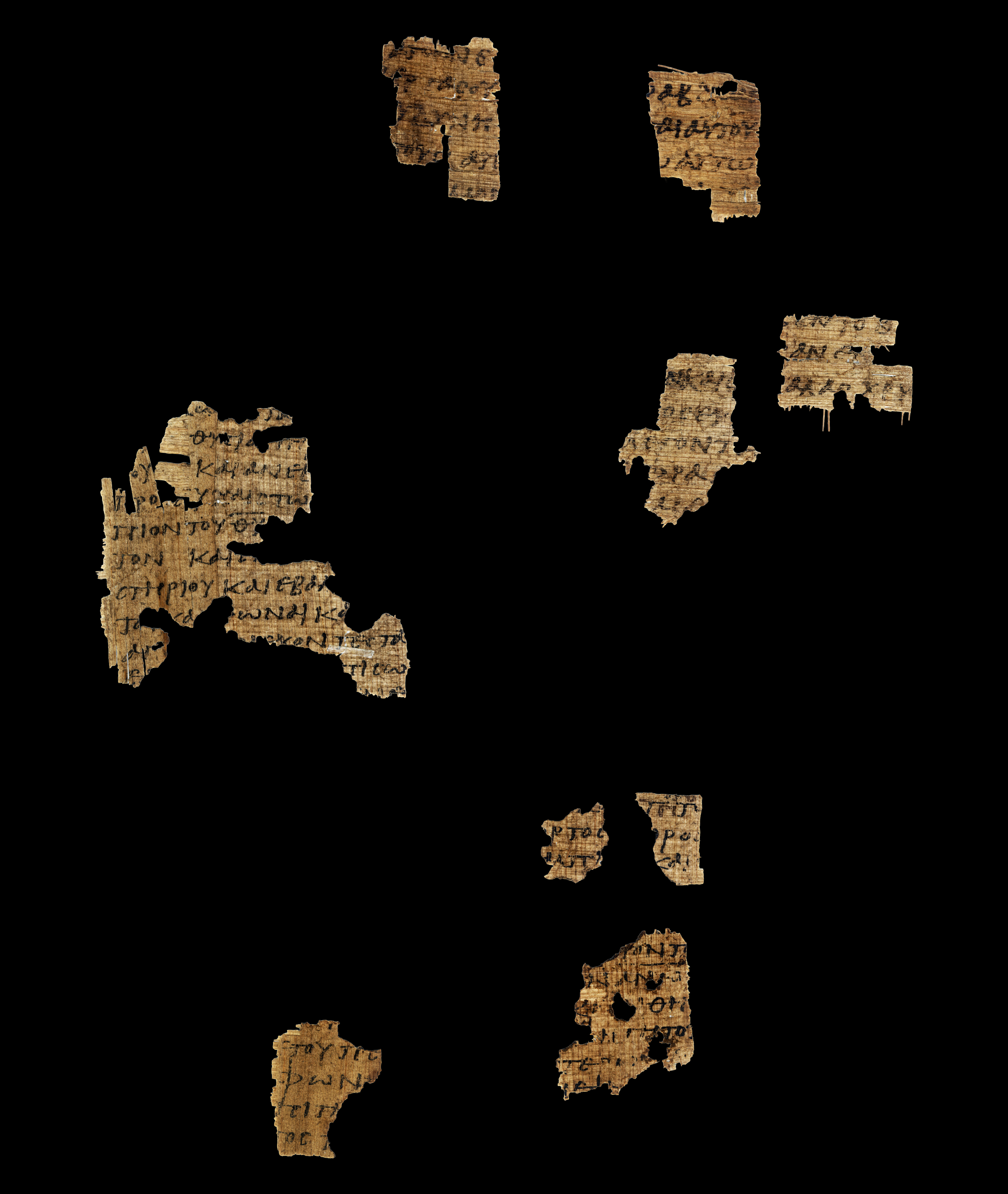
- Plate 1 recto, Revelation 1:1–3, 2:1–3, 2:4–3, 2:27–29, 5:8–9, 8:3–8, 8:11–13
- Name: P. Oxy. 4499
- Text: Rev 2-3, 5-6, 8-15
- Date: c. 225-275
- Found: Oxyrhynchus, Egypt
- Now at: Ashmolean Museum
- Cite: Juan Chapa, Oxyrynchus Papyri 66:11-39. (#4499)
- Size: 26 fragments; 15.5 x 23.5 cm; 33-36 lines/page
- Type: Alexandrian, close agreement with A & C
- Category: I
- Note: Gives number of the beast as 616

Papyrus 115, also known as P. Oxy. 4499, is a fragmented manuscript of the New Testament written in Greek on papyrus. It is designated by the siglum 𝔓^{115} in the Gregory-Aland numbering of New Testament manuscripts. It consists of 26 fragments of a codex containing parts of the Book of Revelation. Using the study of comparative writing styles (palaeography), the manuscript is dated to the third century, c. 225-275 AD. Scholars Bernard Pyne Grenfell and Arthur Hunt discovered the papyrus in Oxyrhynchus, Egypt.

𝔓^{115} was not deciphered and published until 2011. It is currently housed at the Ashmolean Museum.

== Description ==
The manuscript is a codex (precursor to the modern book) although in a very fragmentary condition. In its original form it was sized 15.5 cm by 22 cm, with 33-36 lines per page. The surviving text of Revelation, of its 22 chapters includes:

2:1-3, 13-15, 27-29
3:10-12
5:8-9
6:5-6
8:3-8, 11-13
9:1-5, 7-16, 18-21
10:1-4, 8-11
11:1-5, 8-15, 18-19
12:1-5, 8-10, 12-17
13:1-3, 6-16, 18
14:1-3, 5-7, 10-11, 14-15, 18-20
15:1, 4-7.

Due to the writing on the pages having a tendency to be narrower when the binding is on the right hand side, it is likely the codex was bound before the copyist started writing in it. After its publication, scholar David C. Parker notes the manuscript "is a significant contribution to our understanding of the text of the book of Revelation", and as such "may shed light on a crucial period in the development of the text of Revelation."

There are some textual corrections in the manuscript which may be evidence the copyist had access to more than one examplar. Out of 165 variant readings in the manuscript, only nine are considered "singular" or "unique" readings. Five of these are according to Parker "obviously false", and there are therefore only four new textual readings. Parker concludes that "none of these readings is original." After a full overview of the manuscript, Parker summises: "It is sometimes suggested that the papyri have not had any genuine effect on the printed text of the New Testament. The example of this witness alone is sufficient to disprove the claim." Biblical scholar Philip Comfort declares that "𝔓^{115} has superior testimony to that of 𝔓^{47}, which aligns with א and together form the second-best witness to the book of Revelation."

The manuscript has evidence of the following nomina sacra (names/titles considered sacred in Christianity): Ι̅Η̅Λ̅ (Israel), Α̅Υ̅Τ̅Ο̅Υ̅ (his), Π̅Ρ̅Σ̅ (Father), Θ̅Ω̅/Θ̅Ν̅/Θ̅Υ̅ (God), Α̅Ν̅Ω̅Ν̅/Α̅Ν̅Ο̅Υ̅ (man), Π̅Ν̅Α̅ (Spirit), Ο̅Υ̅Ν̅Ο̅Υ̅/Ο̅Υ̅Ν̅Ο̅Ν̅/Ο̅Υ̅Ν̅Ω̅ (heaven), Κ̅Υ̅ (Master/Lord). The manuscript uses the Greek numeral system, with no number extant as being written out in full.

== Text ==
The manuscript is considered to be a witness to the Alexandrian text-type, following the text of Codex Alexandrinus (A) and Codex Ephraemi Rescriptus (C). In a comparison of the textual readings of this manuscript, Parker notes it is "usually right" when it agrees with A as opposed to C, incorrect when it disagrees with both, and only right less than half the time when it disagrees with A. Accordingly, this shows that the text seen in A "confirms the superior quality" of A as opposed to the text seen in C. The textual variants against Codex Sinaiticus א and 𝔓^{47} show that 𝔓^{115} is more often right in reading the same as א as opposed to 𝔓^{47}. The manuscript also agrees with some later minuscules, which Parker states that "new discoveries sometimes show late witnesses to contain variants that are far older than we could have known." According to Parker, the agreement of readings between this manuscripts and A and C "confirms the high quality of 𝔓^{115}."

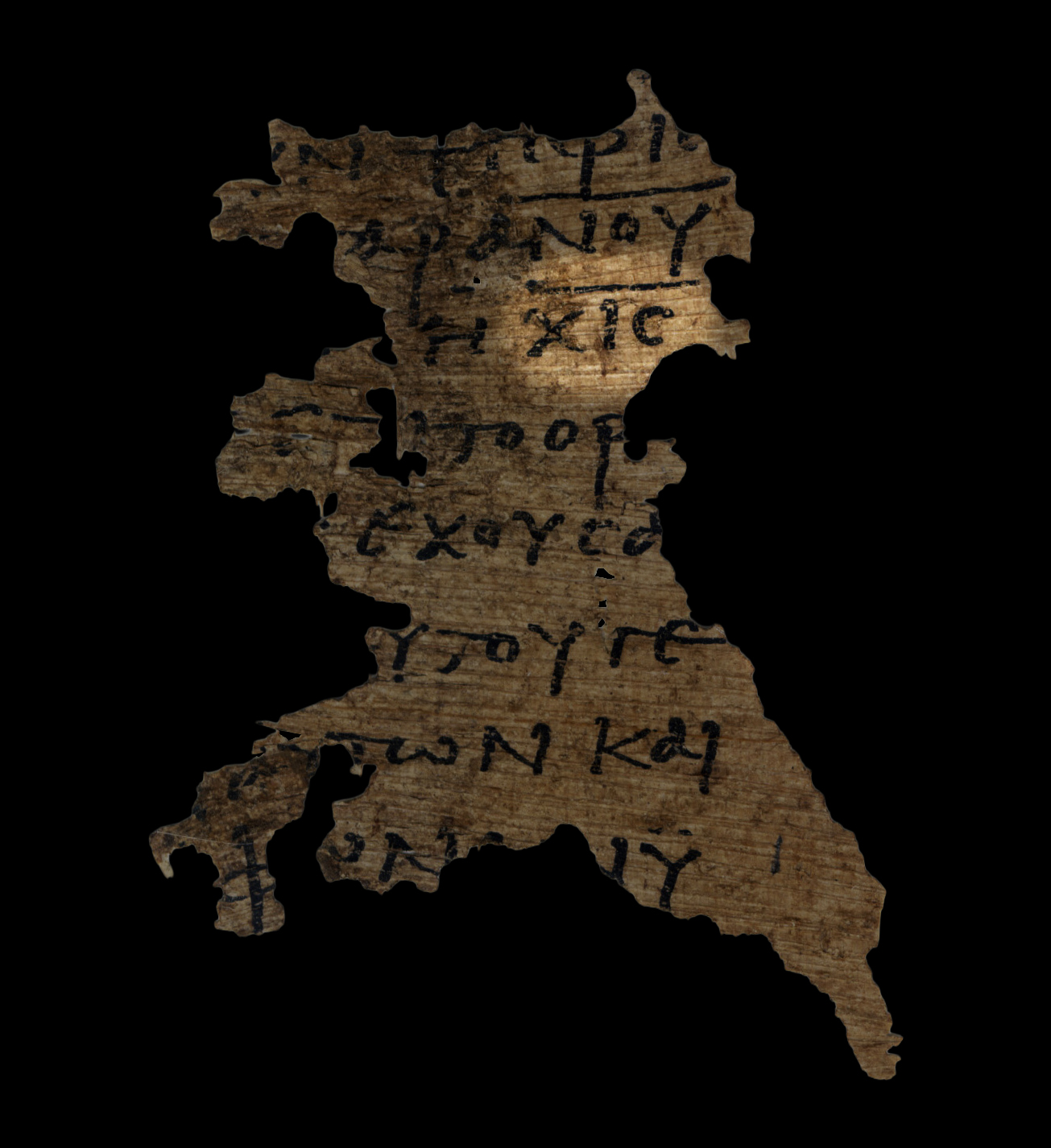
Papyrus 115 fragment of Rev 13:18 with 616 given as the number of the beast

An interesting element of 𝔓^{115} is that it apparently gives the number of the beast in Revelation 13:18 as 616 (chi, iota, stigma / Χ̅Ι̅Ϛ̅), rather than the majority reading of 666 (chi, xi, stigma / ΧΞϚ), as does Codex Ephraemi Rescriptus. According to the transcription of the INTF, a conjectured reading of the manuscript, due to the space left, is [χ̅ξ̅ϛ̅] η χ̅ι̅ϛ̅ (666 or 616), therefore not giving a definitive number to the beast.

Some notable readings

Revelation 8:12

και το τριτον της σεληνης (and a third of the moon):

omit. : 𝔓^{115}
incl. : א A

Revelation 9:11

ο απολλυων (the Destroyer) : 𝔓^{115} 1740
απολλυων (Apollyon) : 𝔓^{47} א pc gig 2344

Revelation 9:13

δ̅ / τεσσάρων (fourth)

incl. : 𝔓^{115} Majority of manuscripts vg^{cl} sy^{p}^{, h}
omit. : 𝔓^{47} א A 0207 1611 2053 2344 pc lat sy^{h} co

Revelation 11:15

λεγουσαι (they said) : 𝔓^{115} 𝔓^{47} א C 051 1006 1611 1841 1854 2329 2344 $\mathfrak{M}$^{A}
λεγοντες (saying) : A 2053 2351 $\mathfrak{M}$^{K}.

Revelation 13:8

το ονομα (name) : 𝔓^{115} $\mathfrak{M}$ co Bea.
τα ονοματα αυτων (their names) : 𝔓^{47} א P 051 1006 1841 2329 al lat
το ονομα αυτου (his name) : C 1854 2053 pc Ir^{lat} Prim.

Revelation 13:13

εκ του ουρανου (out of heaven)

omit. : 𝔓^{115} 175.
incl. : 𝔓^{47} א A Majority of manuscripts

Revelation 14:6

κατοικουντας (who inhabit) : 𝔓^{115} A 2049 69.
καθημενους (dwelling) : 𝔓^{47} א C P 1611 1854 2053 2329 pc sy^{p}^{, h} Or

Revelation 14:20

β̅χ̅ (2600) : 𝔓^{115}.
α̅χ̅ / χιλιων εξακοσιων (1600) : 𝔓^{47} א^{c2} A 42 69 82 93 177 325 456 498 627 699 1849 2138 2329 Majority of manuscripts

== Gallery ==
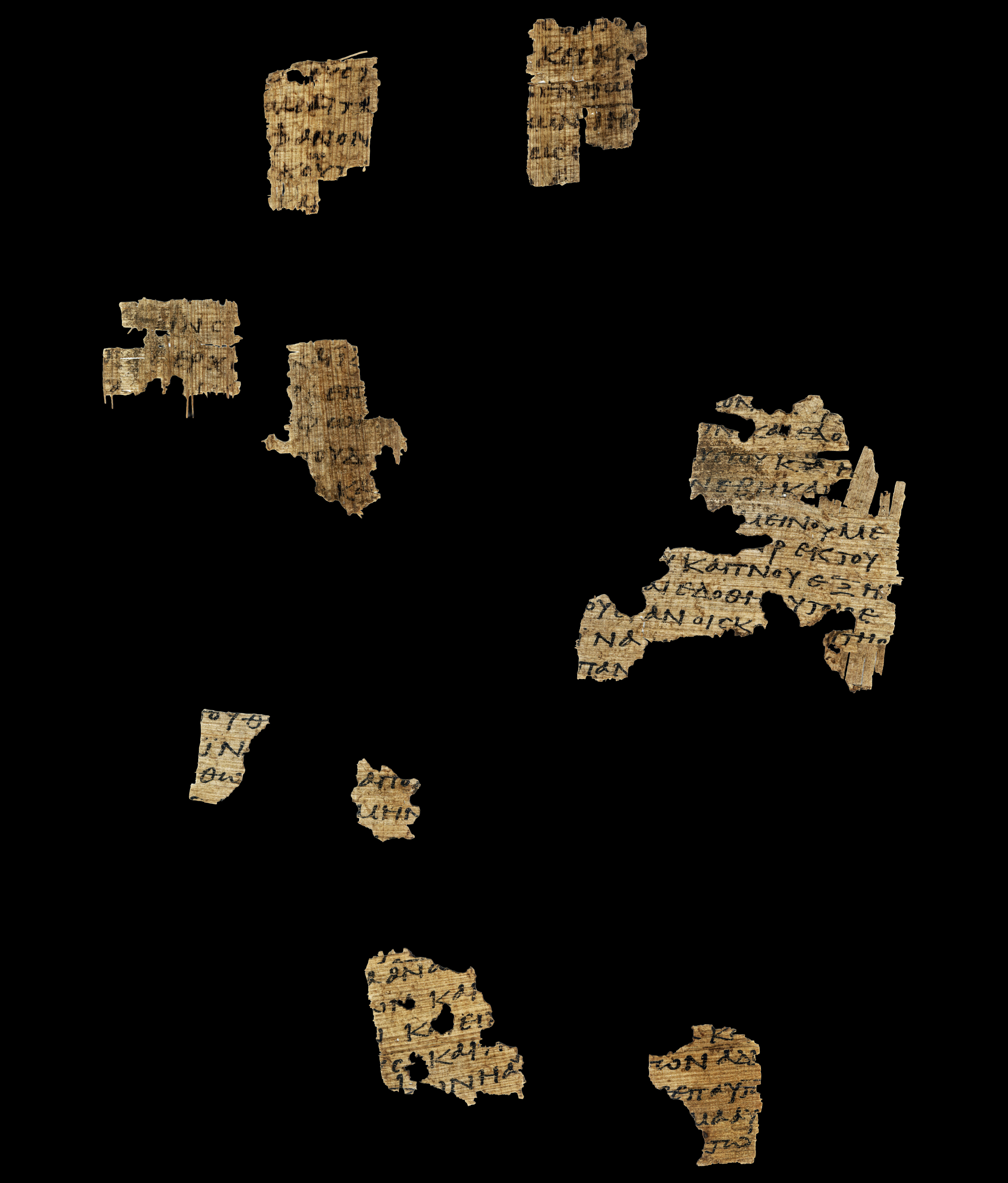
Plate 1 verso, Revelation 2:13–14, 3:10–12, 6:5–6, 9:1–5, 9:7–11

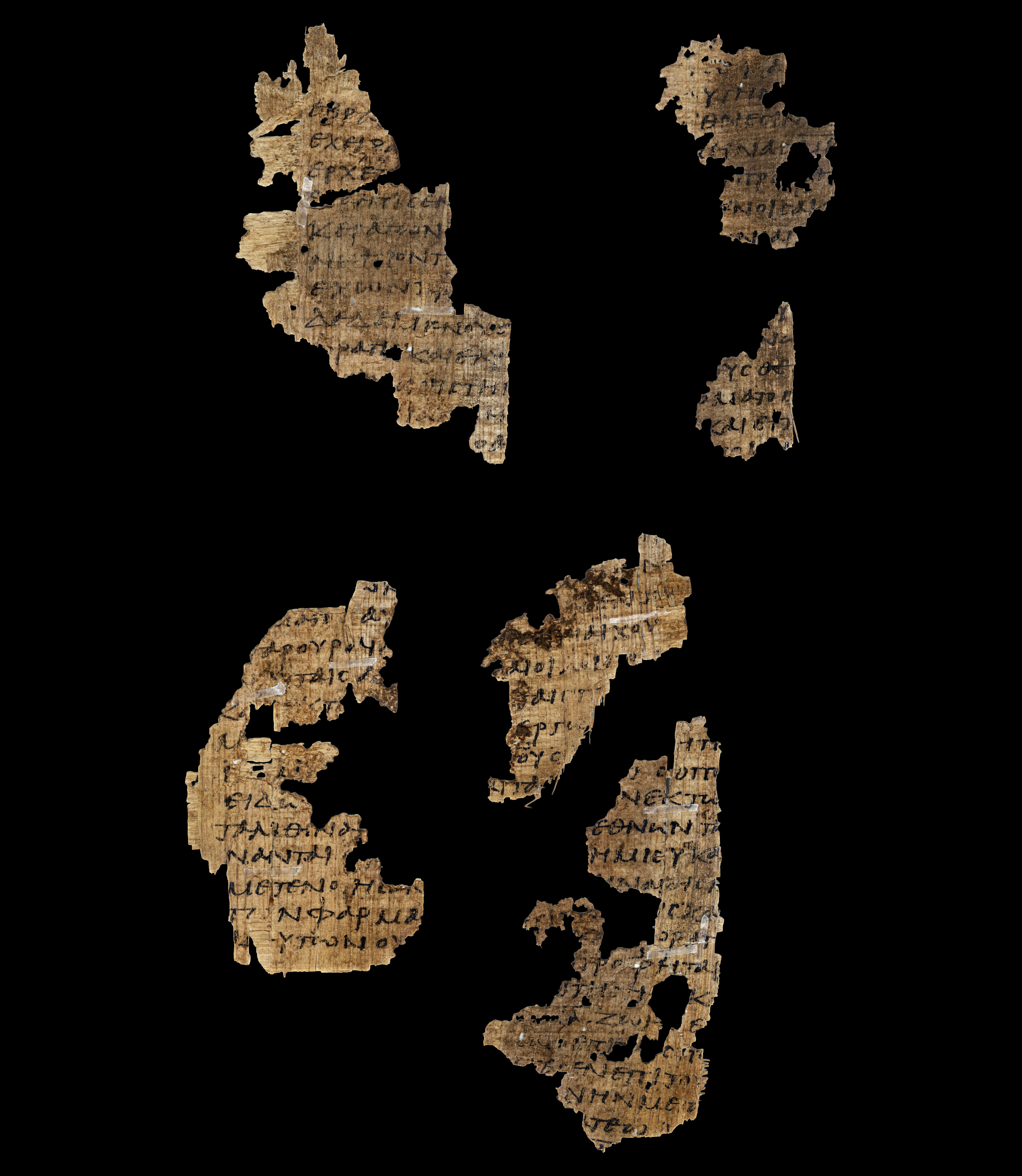
Plate 2 recto, Revelation 9:11–16, 9:18–21, 11:1–6, 11:8–12

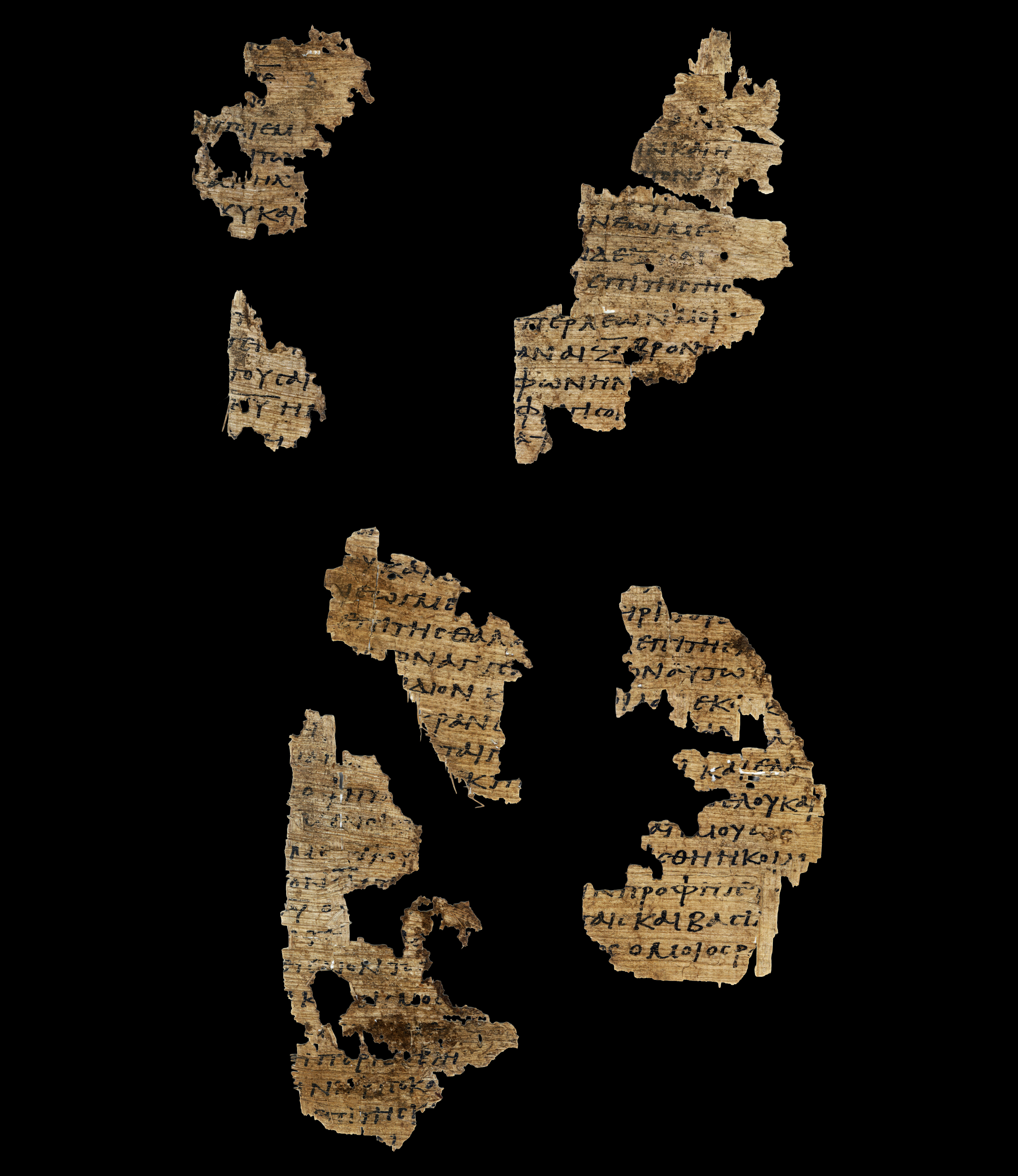
Plate 2 verso, Revelation 10:1–5, 10:7–11, 11:1, 11:13–15, 11:18–19, 12:1

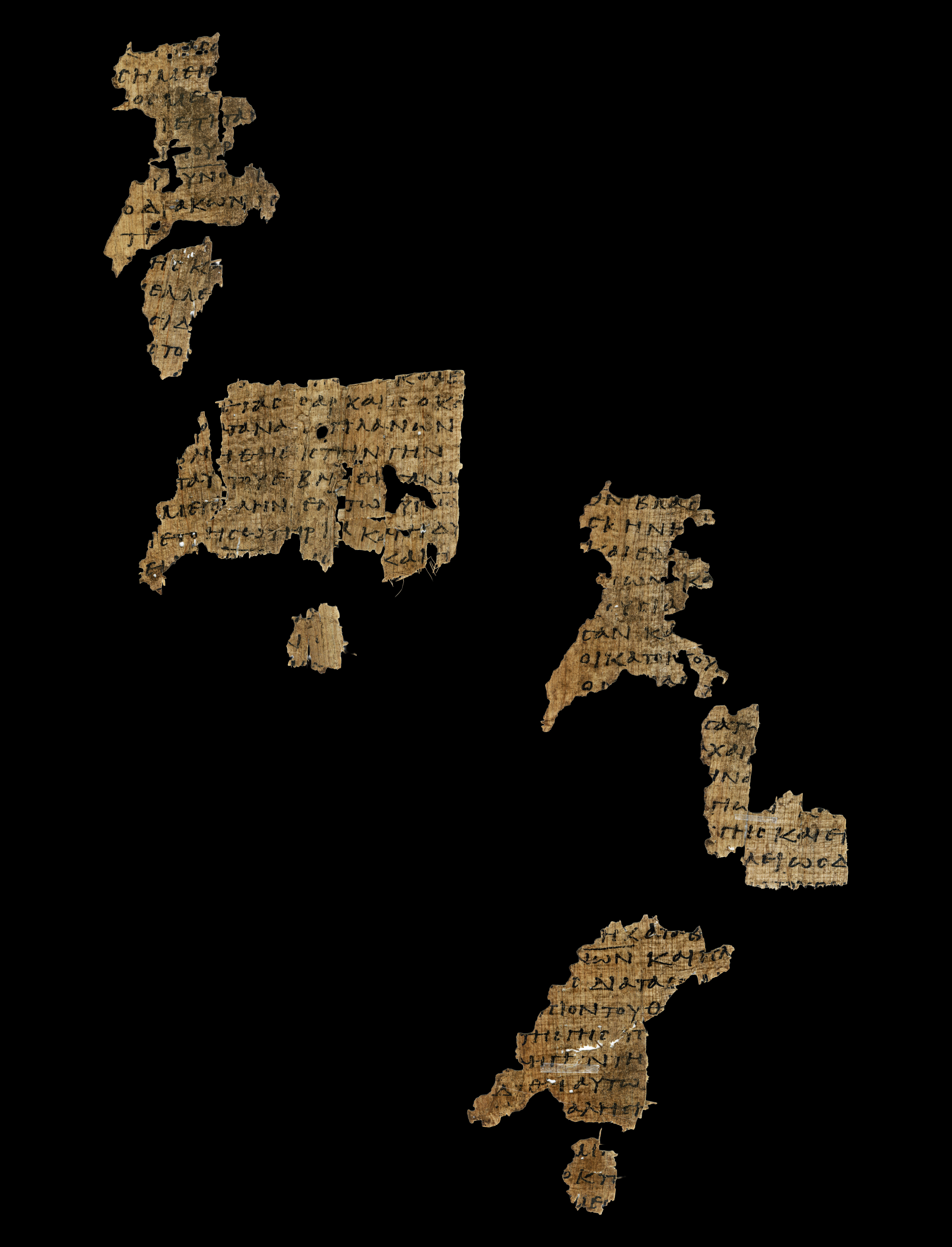
Plate 3 recto, Revelation 12:2–5, 12:8–10, 13:6–16

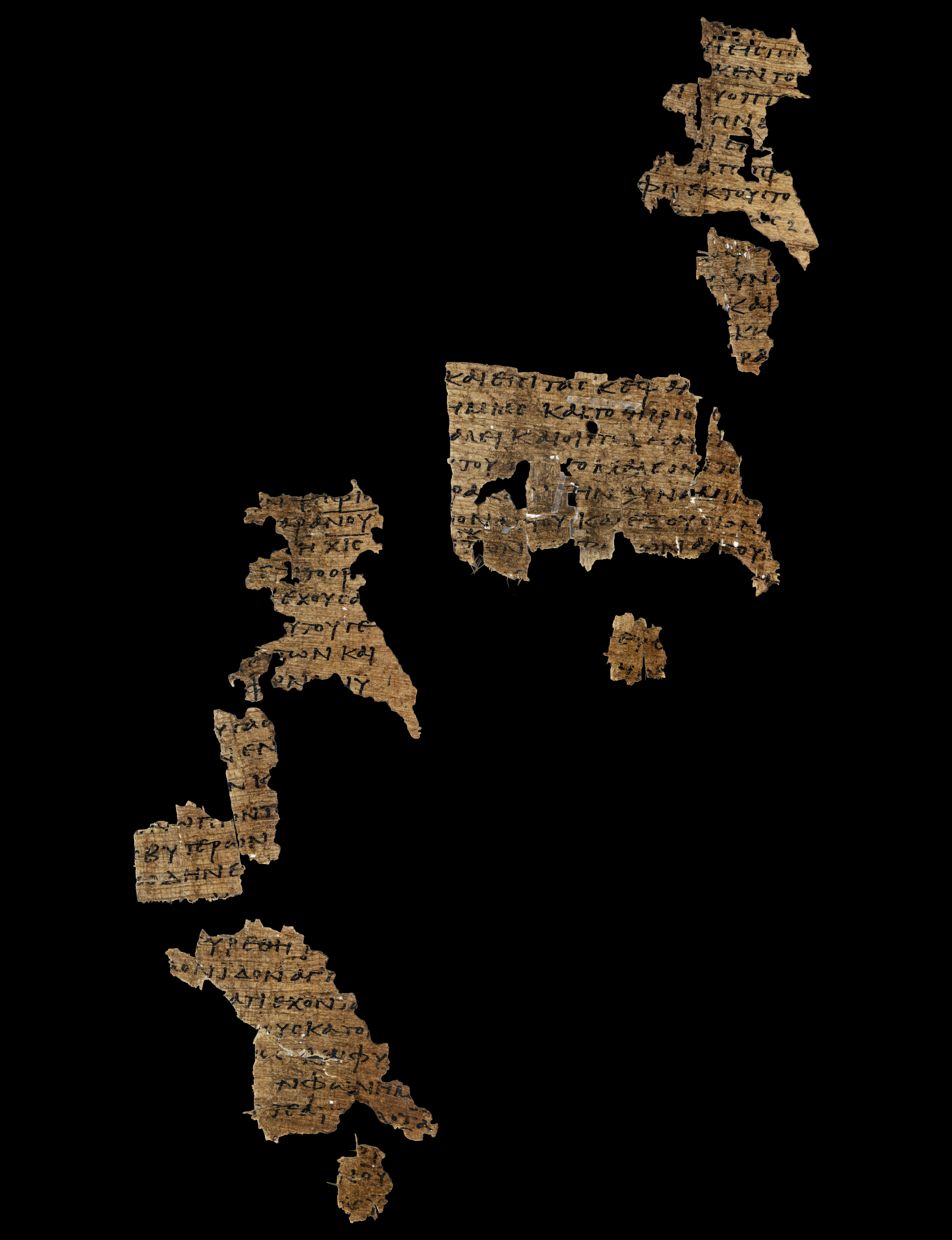
Plate 3 verso, Revelation 12:13–17, 13:1–3, 13:18, 14:1–3, 14:5–7

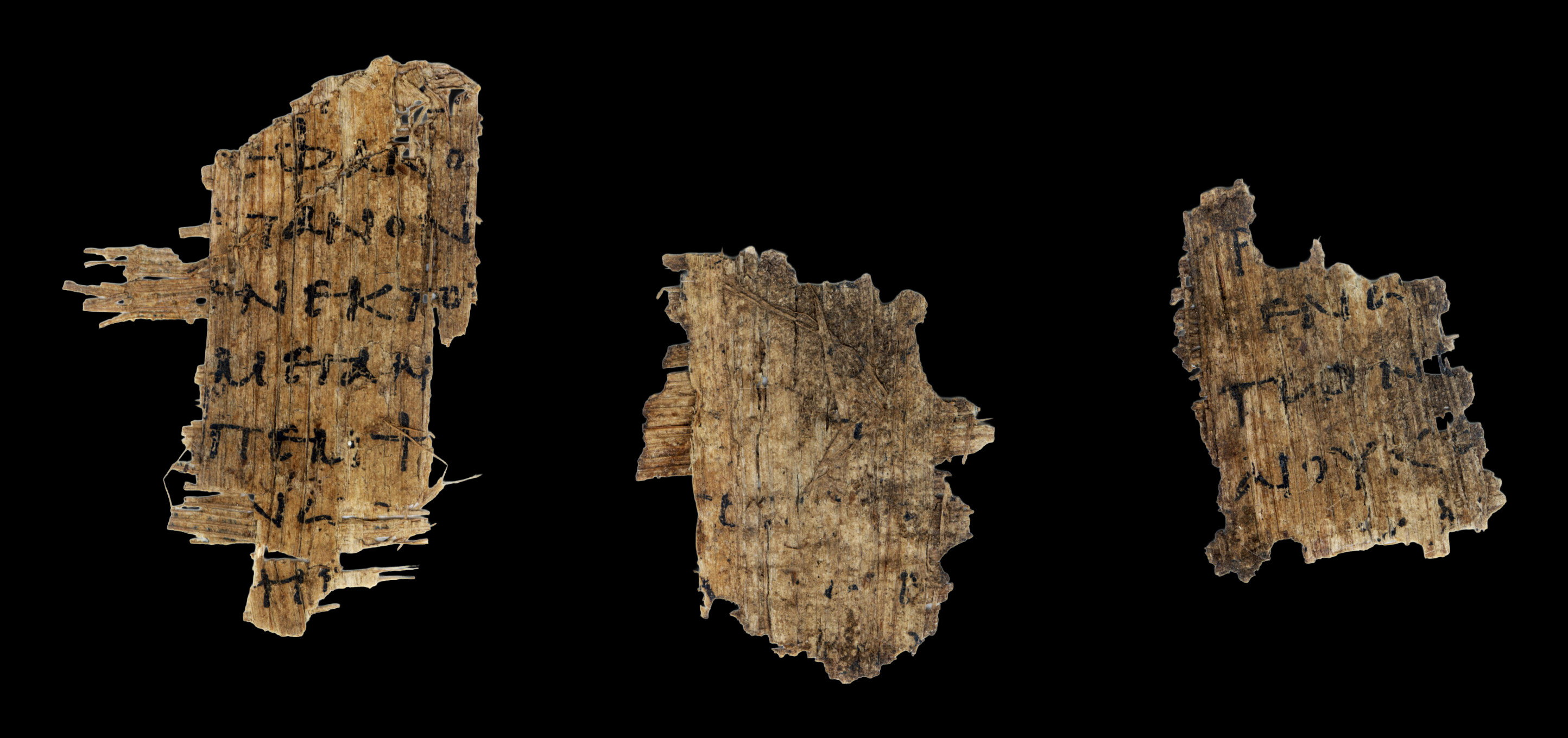
Plate 4 recto, Revelation 14:10–11; 14:14–15

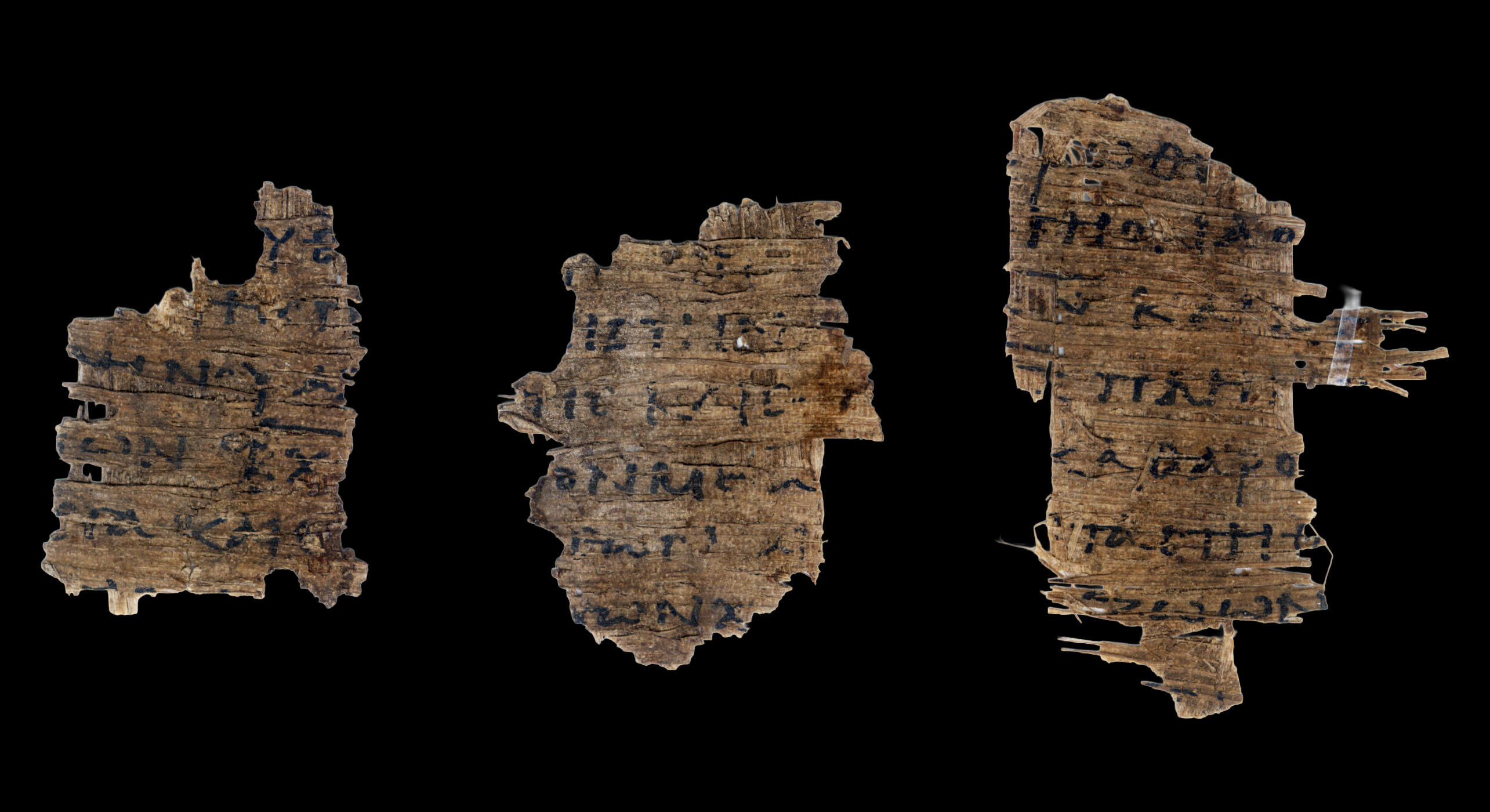
Plate 4 verso, Revelation 14:18–20, 15:1, 15:4–7

== See also ==
- List of New Testament papyri
- Oxyrhynchus papyri
- Stigma (letter)
