= Names for the number 0 in English =

"Zero" is the usual name for the number 0 in English. In British English "nought" is also used and in American English "naught" is used occasionally for zero, but (as with British English) "naught" is more often used as an archaic word for nothing. "Nil", "love", and "duck" are used by different sports for scores of zero.

There is a need to maintain an explicit distinction between digit zero and letter O, (Note: In many fonts the character for zero (number "0") and the letter "O" have slightly different shapes. In some fonts (and also in hand writing), where there is a need for a clear distinction a "slashed zero" is used.) which, because they are both usually represented in English orthography (and indeed most orthographies that use Latin script and Arabic numerals) with a simple circle or oval, have a centuries-long history of being frequently conflated. But in spoken English the number 0 is often read as the letter "o" ("oh"). For example, when dictating a telephone number, the series of digits "1070" may be spoken as "one zero seven zero" or as "one oh seven oh", even though the letter "O" on the telephone keypad in fact corresponds to the digit 6.

In certain contexts, zero and nothing are interchangeable, as is "null". Sporting terms are sometimes used as slang terms for zero, as are "nada", "zilch" and "zip".

== "Zero" and "cipher" ==
"Zero" and "cipher" are both names for the number 0, but the use of "cipher" for the number is rare and only used in very formal literary English today (with "cipher" more often referring to cryptographic ciphers). The terms are doublets, which means they have entered the language through different routes but have the same etymological root, which is the Arabic "صفر" (which transliterates as "sifr"). Via Italian this became "zefiro" and thence "zero" in modern English, Portuguese, French, Polish, Catalan, Romanian and Italian ("cero" in Spanish). But via Spanish it became "cifra" and thence "cifre" in Old French, "cifră" in Romanian and "cipher" in modern English (and "chiffre" in modern French).

"Zero" is more commonly used in mathematics and science, whereas "cipher" is used only in a literary style. Both also have other connotations. One may refer to a person as being a "social cipher", but would name them "Mr. Zero", for example.

In his discussion of "naught" and "nought" in Modern English Usage (see below), H. W. Fowler uses "cipher" to name the number 0.

== "Nought" and "naught" versus "ought" and "aught" ==
In English, "nought" and "naught" mean zero or nothingness, whereas "ought" and "aught" (the former in its noun sense) strictly speaking mean "all" or "anything", and are not names for the number 0. Nevertheless they are sometimes used as such in American English; for example, "aught" as a placeholder for zero in the pronunciation of calendar year numbers. That practice is then also reapplied in the pronunciation of derived terms, such as when the rifle caliber .30-06 Springfield (introduced in 1906) is accordingly referred to by the name "thirty-aught-six".

The words "nought" and "naught" are spelling variants. They are, according to H. W. Fowler, not a modern accident as might be thought, but have descended that way from Old English. There is a distinction in British English between the two, but it is not one that is universally recognized. This distinction is that "nought" is primarily used in a literal arithmetic sense, where the number 0 is straightforwardly meant, whereas "naught" is used in poetical and rhetorical senses, where "nothing" could equally well be substituted. So the name of the board game is "noughts & crosses", whereas the rhetorical phrases are "bring to naught", "set at naught", and "availeth naught". The Reader's Digest Right Word at the Right Time labels "naught" as "old-fashioned".

Whilst British English makes this distinction, in American English, the spelling "naught" is preferred for both the literal and rhetorical/poetic senses.

"Naught" and "nought" come from the Old English "nāwiht" and "nōwiht", respectively, both of which mean "nothing". They are compounds of no- ("no") and wiht ("thing").

The words "aught" and "ought" (the latter in its noun sense) similarly come from Old English "āwiht" and "ōwiht", which are similarly compounds of a ("ever") and wiht. Their meanings are opposites to "naught" and "nought"—they mean "anything" or "all". (Fowler notes that "aught" is an archaism, and that "all" is now used in phrases such as "for all (that) I know", where once they would have been "for aught (that) I know".)

However, "aught" and "ought" are also sometimes used as names for 0, in contradiction of their strict meanings. The reason for this is a rebracketing, whereby "a nought" and "a naught" have been misheard as "an ought" and "an aught".

Samuel Johnson thought that since "aught" was generally used for "anything" in preference to "ought", so also "naught" should be used for "nothing" in preference to "nought". However, he observed that "custom has irreversibly prevailed in using 'naught' for 'bad' and 'nought' for 'nothing'". Whilst this distinction existed in his time, in modern English, as observed by Fowler and The Reader's Digest above, it does not exist today. But the sense of "naught" meaning "bad" is still preserved in the word "naughty", which is simply the noun "naught" plus the adjectival suffix "-y". This has never been spelled "noughty".

The words "owt" and "nowt" are used in Northern English. For example, if tha does owt for nowt do it for thysen: if you do something for nothing do it for yourself.

The word aught continues in use for 0 in a series of one or more for sizes larger than 1. For American Wire Gauge, the largest gauges are written 1/0, 2/0, 3/0, and 4/0 and pronounced "one aught", "two aught", etc. Shot pellet diameters 0, 00, and 000 are pronounced "single aught", "double aught", and "triple aught". Decade names with a leading zero (e.g., 1900 to 1909) were pronounced as "aught" or "nought". This leads to the year 1904 ('04) being spoken as "[nineteen] aught four" or "[nineteen] nought four". Another acceptable pronunciation is "[nineteen] oh four".

=== Decade names ===
While "2000s" has been used to describe the decade consisting of the years 2000–2009 in all English speaking countries, there have been some national differences in the usage of other terms.

On 1 January 2000, the BBC listed the noughties (derived from "nought") as a potential moniker for the new decade. This has become a common name for the decade in the U.K. and Australia, as well as some other English-speaking countries. However, it has not become the universal descriptor because, as Canadian novelist Douglas Coupland pointed out early in the decade, "[Noughties] won't work because in America the word 'nought' is never used for zero, never ever".

The American music and lifestyle magazine Wired favoured "Naughties", which they claim was first proposed by the arts collective Foomedia in 1999. However, the term "Naughty Aughties" was suggested as far back as 1975 by Cecil Adams, in his column The Straight Dope.

== "O" ("oh") ==
In spoken English, the number 0 is often read as the letter "o", often spelled oh. This is especially the case when the digit occurs within a list of other digits. While one might say that "a million is expressed in base ten as a one followed by six zeroes", the series of digits "1070" can be read as "one zero seven zero", or "one oh seven oh". This is particularly true of telephone numbers (for example 867-5309, which can be said as "eight-six-seven-five-three-oh-nine"). Another example is James Bond's designation, 007, which is always read as "double-o seven", not "double-zero seven", "zero-zero seven", or "o o seven".

The letter "o" ("oh") is also used in spoken English as the name of the number 0 when saying times in the 24-hour clock, particularly in English used by both British and American military forces. Thus 16:05 is "sixteen oh five", and 08:30 is "oh eight thirty".

The use of O as a number can lead to confusion as in the ABO blood group system. Blood can either contain antigen A (type A), antigen B (type B), both (type AB) or none (type O). Since the "O" signifies the lack of antigens, it could be more meaningful to English-speakers for it to represent the number "oh" (zero). However, "blood type O" is properly written with a letter O and not with a number 0.

== Sport ==
In sport, the number 0 can have different names depending on the sport in question and the nationality of the speaker.

=== "Nil" in British sports ===
Many sports that originated in the UK use the word "nil" for 0. Thus, a 3–0 score in a football match would be read as "three-nil". Nil is derived from the Latin word "nihil", meaning "nothing", and often occurs in formal contexts outside of sport, including technical jargon (e.g. "nil by mouth") and voting results.

It is used infrequently in U.S. English, although it has become common in soccer broadcasts.

=== "Nothing" and "oh" in American sports ===
In American sports, the term "nothing" is often employed instead of zero. Thus, a 3–0 score in a baseball game would be read as "three-nothing" or "three to nothing". When talking about a team's record in the standings, the term "oh" is generally used; a 3–0 record would be read as "three and oh".

=== "None" and "duck" in cricket ===
In cricket, a team's score might read 50/0, meaning the team has scored fifty runs and no batter is out. It is read as "fifty for no wicket" or "fifty for none".

Similarly, a bowler's analysis might read 0–50, meaning he has conceded 50 runs without taking a wicket. It is read as "no wicket for fifty" or "none for fifty".

A batsman who is out without scoring is said to have scored "a duck", but "duck" is used somewhat informally compared to the other terms listed in this section. It is also always accompanied by an article and thus is not a true synonym for "zero": a batter scores "a duck" rather than "duck".

The term derives from the phrase "a duck's egg" for a score of zero. The following cricketer's rhyme illustrates this:

And when eleven are matched against eleven,
And wrestle hard the mastery to gain,
Who tops the score is in the seventh heaven,
Who lays an egg, in an abyss of pain.

— M. K. Brodie (1865)

A name related to the "duck egg" in cricket is the "goose egg" in baseball, a name traced back to an 1886 article in The New York Times, where the journalist states that "the New York players presented the Boston men with nine unpalatable goose eggs", i.e., nine scoreless innings.

=== "Love" and "bagel" in tennis ===
In tennis, the word "love" is used to replace 0 to refer to points, sets and matches. If the score during a game is 30–0, it is read as "thirty-love". Similarly, 3–0 would be read as "three-love" if referring to the score during a tiebreak, the games won during a set, or the sets won during a match. The term was adopted by many other racquet sports.

There is no definitive origin for the usage. It first occurred in English, is of comparatively recent origin, and is not used in other languages. The most commonly believed hypothesis is that it is derived from English speakers mis-hearing the French l'œuf ("the egg"), which was the name for a score of zero used in French because the symbol for a zero used on the scoreboard was an elliptical zero symbol, which visually resembled an egg.

Although the use of "duck" in cricket can be said to provide tangential evidence, the l'œuf hypothesis has several problems, not the least of which is that in court tennis the score was not placed upon a scoreboard. There is also scant evidence that the French ever used l'œuf as the name for a zero score in the first place. (Jacob Bernoulli, for example, in his Letter to a Friend, used à but to describe the initial zero–zero score in court tennis, which in English is "love-all".) Some alternative hypotheses have similar problems. For example, the assertion that "love" comes from the Scots word "luff", meaning "nothing", falls at the first hurdle, because there is no authoritative evidence that there has ever been any such word in Scots in the first place.

According to the Oxford English Dictionary, the first use of the word "love" in English to mean "zero" was to define how a game was to be played, rather than the score in the game itself. Gambling games could be played for stakes (money) or "for love (of the game)", i.e., for zero stakes. The first such recorded usage quoted in the OED was in 1678. The shift in meaning from "zero stakes" to "zero score" is not an enormous conceptual leap, and the first recorded usage of the word "love" to mean "no score" is by Hoyle in 1742.

In recent years, a set won 6–0 ("six-love") has been described as a bagel, again a reference to the resemblance of the zero to the foodstuff. It was popularised by American announcer Bud Collins.

== Null ==
In certain contexts, zero and nothing are interchangeable, as is "null". However, in mathematics and many scientific disciplines, a distinction is made (see null). The number 0 is represented by zero while null is a representation of an empty set {}. Hence in computer science a zero represents the outcome of a mathematical computation such as 2−2, while null is used for an undefined state (for example, a memory location that has not been explicitly initialised).

== Slang ==
Sporting terms (see above) are sometimes used as slang terms for zero, as are "nada", "zilch" and "zip".

"Zilch" is a slang term for zero, and it can also mean "nothing". The origin of the term is unknown.

== See also ==
- Names for the number 0 in different languages.
