= Names for the number 0 =

There are several names for the number 0 in different languages.

| Language | Name and pronunciation or transliteration | Notes |
|---|---|---|
| Arabic | صفر (sifr) | |
| Chinese | 零 | The character 零 (pinyin: líng) means "zero" in Chinese, although 〇 is also common. Etymologically 零 is an onomatopoeic word for "light rain". The upper part of the character is 雨, meaning "rain", and the lower part is 令 (lìng), for the sound. |
| Czech | nula | |
| Dutch | nul /nyl/ | |
| English | zero | There are many other names |
| French | zéro /zeʁo/ | |
| German | Null/null | Whether or not the first letter of number names is capitalized – like all nouns are – depends on the sense in which they are used. |
| Greek | μηδέν /miːðɛn/ | Literally meaning "not even one" |
| Bengali | শূন্য (shunno) | the word "শূন্য" comes form the ancient sanskrit sunya. meaning philosophical "emptiness". which Brahmagupta later adapted into mathematics. |
| Hindi | शून्य | |
| Gujarati | શૂન્ય (Śūn'ya) | |
| Haitian Creole | zewo | |
| Hebrew | אֶפֶס (efes) | |
| Indonesian | nol /nɔl/ | Adopted from the Dutch word nul. In addition, people often pronounce it as "kosong" /kɔsɔŋ/, literally meaning 'empty', when spelling telephone numbers. |
| Italian | zero /'dzɛro/ | |
| Japanese | 零 (read rei) | The character 零 (read rei) means "zero" in Japanese, although 〇 is also common. However, in common usage, ゼロ/ぜろ (read zero) is preferred, as it is a direct adaptation of the English equivalent. |
| Kannada | ಸೊನ್ನ (sonne) | |
| Korean | Korean: 영; Hanja: 零; RR: yeong or Korean: 공; Hanja: 空; RR: gong | |
| Lojban | no | |
| Malayalam | പൂജ്യം (poojyam) | |
| Polish | zero /'zɛɾɔ/ | |
| Portuguese | zero /zɛɾu/ | |
| Romanian | zero | |
| Russian | ноль (nol') | |
| Spanish | cero | |
| Tamil | சுழியம் (sūḻiyam), பூஜ்ஜியம் (poojyam), or சைவர் (saivar) | |
| Telugu | సున్న or ౦ (sunna) | |
| Turkish | sıfır | |
| Ukrainian | нуль (nul') | |
