= 616 (number) =

Natural number

| ← 615 | 616 | 617 → |
- List of numbers; Integers; ← 0 100 200 300 400 500 600 700 800 900 →
- Cardinal: six hundred sixteen
- Ordinal: 616th (six hundred sixteenth)
- Factorization: 2^{3} × 7 × 11
- Greek numeral: ΧΙϚ´
- Roman numeral: DCXVI, dcxvi
- Binary: 1001101000_{2}
- Ternary: 211211_{3}
- Senary: 2504_{6}
- Octal: 1150_{8}
- Duodecimal: 434_{12}
- Hexadecimal: 268_{16}

616 (six hundred [and] sixteen) is the natural number following 615 and preceding 617.

While 666 is called the "number of the beast" in most manuscripts of Revelation 13:18, a fragment of the papyrus 115 gives the number as 616.

== In mathematics ==
616 is a member of the Padovan sequence, coming after 265, 351, 465 (it is the sum of the first two of these). 616 is a polygonal number in four different ways: it is a heptagonal number, as well as 13-, 31- and 104-gonal.

It is also the sum of the squares of the factorials of 2,3,4: (2!)² + (3!)² + (4!)² = 4+36+576=616.

The 616th harmonic number is the first to exceed seven.

== Number of the beast ==
666 is generally believed to have been the original Number of the Beast in the Book of Revelation in the Christian Bible. In 2005, however, a fragment of papyrus 115 was revealed, containing the earliest known version of that part of the Book of Revelation discussing the Number of the Beast. It gave the number as 616, suggesting that this may have been the original. One possible explanation for the two different numbers is that they reflect two different spellings of Emperor Nero/Neron's name, for which (according to this theory) this number is believed to be a code.
