= Number of the beast =

Number associated with the Beast of Revelation

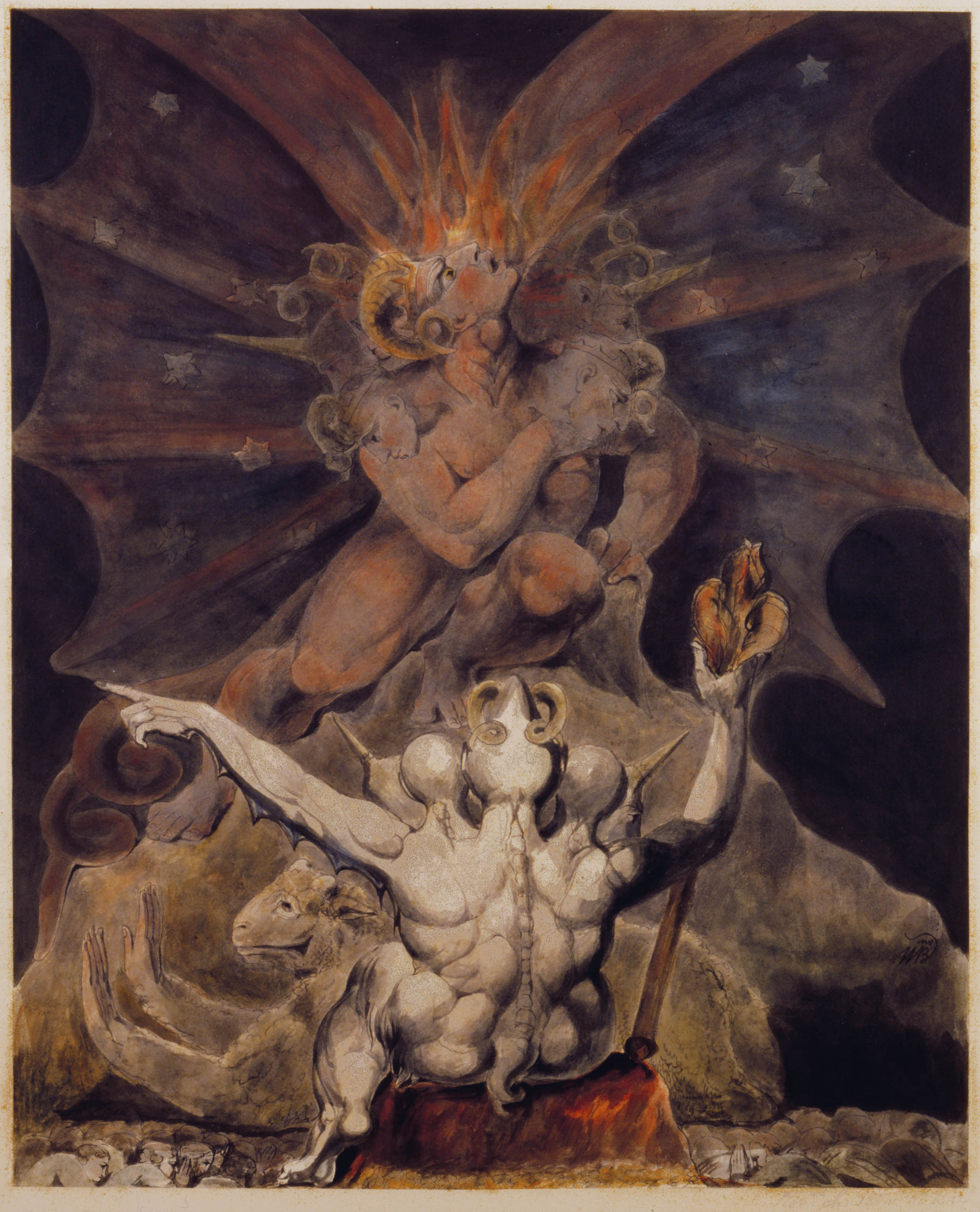
The Number of the Beast Is 666 by William Blake, 1805

The number of the beast (Koine Greek: Ἀριθμὸς τοῦ θηρίου, Arithmós toû thēríou) is associated with the Beast of Revelation in chapter 13, verse 18 of the Book of Revelation. In most manuscripts of the New Testament and in English translations of the Bible, the number of the beast is six hundred sixty-six (666) or χ̅ξ̅ϛ̅ (in Greek numerals, χ̅ represents 600, ξ̅ represents 60 and ϛ̅ represents 6). Papyrus 115 (which is the oldest preserved manuscript of the Revelation as of 2017), as well as other ancient sources like Codex Ephraemi Rescriptus, give the number of the beast as χ̅ι̅ϛ̅ (616), not 666; critical editions of the Greek text, such as the Novum Testamentum Graece, note χιϛ/616 as a variant. There is a broad consensus in contemporary scholarship that the number of the beast is linked by gematria to the typology of Roman Emperor Nero, an infamous persecutor of Christians.

== In the Bible ==
=== χξϛ ===
The number of the beast is described in Revelation 13:15–18. Several translations have been interpreted for the meaning of the phrase "Here is Wisdom. Let him that hath understanding count the number of the beast..." where the peculiar Greek word ψηφισάτω (psephisato) is used. Possible translations include "to count", "to reckon" and also "to vote" or "to decide".

In the Textus Receptus, derived from Byzantine text-type manuscripts, the number six hundred sixty-six is represented by the Greek numerals χ̅ξ̅ϛ̅, with the Greek ligature stigma (ϛ̅) representing the number 6:

^{17}καὶ ἵνα μή τις δύνηται ἀγοράσαι ἢ πωλῆσαι εἰ μὴ ὁ ἔχων τὸ χάραγμα, τὸ ὄνομα τοῦ θηρίου ἢ τὸν ἀριθμὸν τοῦ ὀνόματος αὐτοῦ. ^{18}Ὧδε ἡ σοφία ἐστίν· ὁ ἔχων τὸν νοῦν ψηφισάτω τὸν ἀριθμὸν τοῦ θηρίου· ἀριθμὸς γὰρ ἀνθρώπου ἐστί· καὶ ὁ ἀριθμὸς αὐτοῦ χξϛʹ.

English
"^{17}And that no man might buy or sell, save he that had the mark, or the name of the beast, or the number of his name. ^{18}Here is wisdom. Let him that hath understanding count the number of the beast: for it is the number of a man; and his number is 666."

In several editions of the Greek Bible, this number is instead represented by three words spelled out, ἑξακόσιοι ἑξήκοντα ἕξ, hexakósioi hexḗkonta héx, meaning "six hundred [and] sixty-six":

=== χιϛ ===
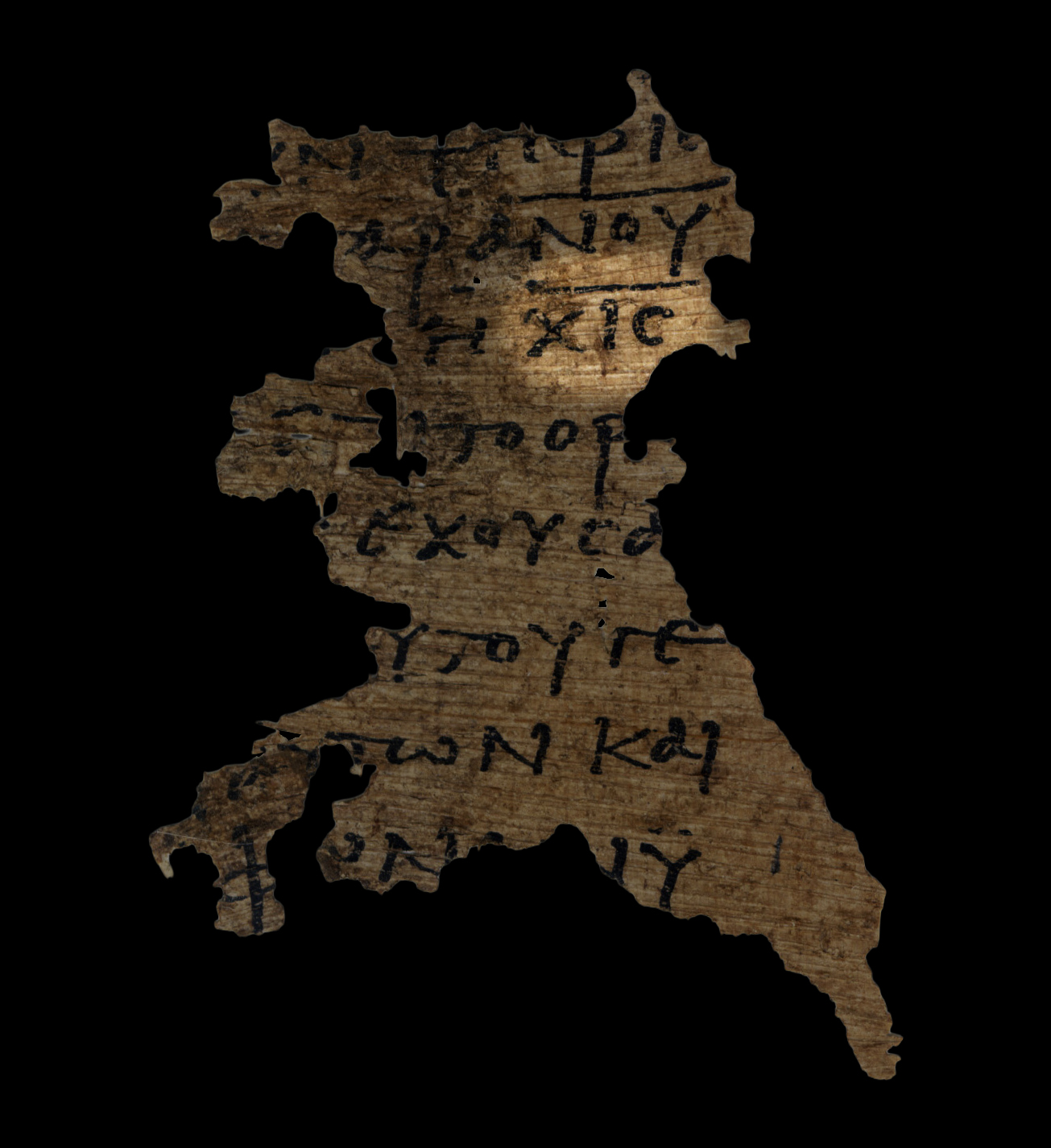
Fragment from Papyrus 115 (P115) of Revelation in the 66th vol. of the Oxyrhynchus series (P. Oxy. 4499). Has the number of the beast as χιϛ, 616.

Although Irenaeus (2nd century AD) affirmed the number to be 666 and reported several scribal errors of the number, theologians have doubts about the traditional reading because of the appearance of the figure 616 in the Codex Ephraemi Rescriptus (C; Paris—one of the four great uncial codices), as well as in the Latin version of Tyconius (DCXVI, ed. Souter in the Journal of Theology, SE, April 1913), and in an ancient Armenian version (ed. Conybeare, 1907). Irenaeus knew about the 616 reading, but did not adopt it (Haer. V, 30) noting instead that those who spoke with the Apostle John (traditionally considered the author of the Book of Revelation) "face to face" said that the number was 666. In the 380s, correcting the existing Latin-language version of the New Testament (commonly referred to as the Vetus Latina), Jerome retained "666".

Around 2005, a fragment from Papyrus 115, taken from the Oxyrhynchus site, was discovered at the University of Oxford's Ashmolean Museum. It gave the beast's number as 616 (χ̅ι̅ϛ̅). This fragment is the oldest manuscript (about 1,700 years old) of Revelation 13 found as of 2017. Codex Ephraemi Rescriptus, known before the Papyrus 115 finding but dating to after it, has 616 written in full: ἑξακόσιοι δέκα ἕξ, hexakosioi deka hex (lit. "six hundred and sixteen").

Papyrus 115 and Ephraemi Rescriptus have led some scholars to regard 616 as the original number of the beast. According to Paul Louis Couchoud, "The number 666 has been substituted for 616 either by analogy with 888, the [Greek] number of Jesus (Gustav Adolf Deissmann), or because it is a triangular number, the sum of the first 36 numbers (1+2+3+4+5+6+...+36 = 666)".

== Interpretations ==
The beast's identity and the beast's number are usually interpreted by applying one of three methods:

1. Using gematria to find the numbers that equate to the names of world leaders, to check for a match with the scriptural number.
2. Treating the number of the beast as a duration of time.
3. Linking the scriptural imagery and symbolism of the Antichrist with characteristics of world leaders who oppose Christianity.

=== Identification by gematria ===
In Greek isopsephy and Hebrew gematria, every letter has a corresponding numeric value. Summing these numbers gives a numeric value to a word or name. The use of isopsephy to calculate "the number of the beast" is used in many of the below interpretations.

==== Nero ====
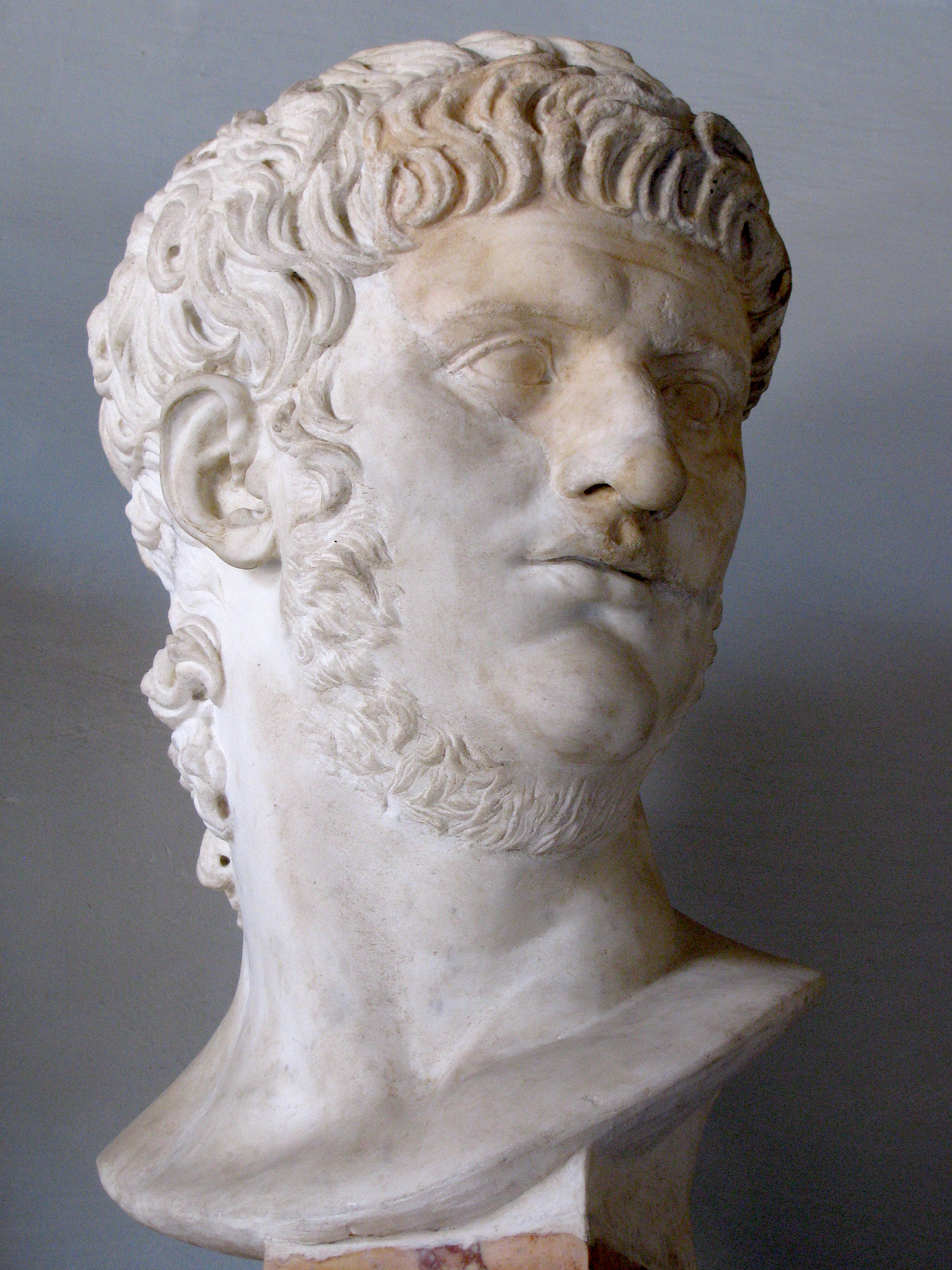
Bust of Nero at Musei Capitolini, Rome

There is a broad consensus in contemporary scholarship that the number of the beast refers to the Roman Emperor Nero.

Since the 1830s, theologians like Christian Friedrich Fritzsche, Franz Ferdinand Benary, Ferdinand Hitzig and Eduard Reuss pointed the number 666 to Nero, who was the first emperor to have persecuted Christians. Preterist theologians typically support the interpretation that 666 is the numerical equivalent of the name and title Nero Caesar (Roman Emperor 54–68 AD). Written in Aramaic, this can be valued at 666 using the Hebrew numerology of gematria, and was used to secretly speak against the emperor. Additionally, "Nero Caesar" in the Hebrew alphabet is נרון קסר NRON QSR, which in standard gematria (mispar hechrechi) is given the numbers 50 200 6 50 100 60 200, which add up to 666.

The Greek term χάραγμα (charagma, "mark" in Revelation 13:16) was most commonly used for imprints on documents or coins. Charagma is well attested to have been an imperial seal of the Roman Empire used on official documents during the 1st and 2nd centuries. In the reign of Emperor Decius (249–251 AD), those who did not possess the certificate of sacrifice (libellus) to Caesar could not pursue trades, a prohibition that conceivably goes back to Nero, reminding one of Revelation 13:17.

Preterists argue that Revelation was written before the destruction of the Temple, with Nero exiling John to Patmos. Most scholars, however, argue it was written after Nero committed suicide in AD 68. Our Sunday Visitor's Catholic Encyclopedia has noted that Revelation was "written during the latter part of the reign of the Roman Emperor Domitian, probably in A.D. 95 or 96". Additional Protestant scholars are in agreement. (Note: Berthold-Bond (1989) notes in consensus that Revelation was written around 95 AD.)

Because some people believe Revelation 13 speaks of a future prophetic event, "All who dwell on the earth will worship him, whose names have not been written in the Book of Life of the Lamb slain from the foundation of the world." (Revelation 13:8 NKJV), some have argued that the interpretation of Nero meeting the fulfillment is an impossibility if Revelation was written around 30 years after the death of Nero. (Note: Lewis (n.d.), along with other scholars, notes that Revelation was written about 95 AD.) However, rumors circulated that Nero had not really died and would return to power.

It has also been suggested that the numerical reference to Nero was a code to imply but not directly identify emperor Domitian, whose style of rulership resembled that of Nero, who heavily taxed the people of Asia (Lydia), to whom the Book of Revelation was primarily addressed. The popular Nero Redivivus legend stating that Nero would return to life can also be noted; "After Nero's suicide in AD 68, there was a widespread belief, especially in the eastern provinces, that he was not dead and somehow would return. Suetonius (XL) relates how court astrologers had predicted Nero's fall but that he would have power in the east. And, indeed, at least three false claimants did present themselves as Nero redivivus (resurrected).

An Aramaic scroll from Wadi Murabba'at, dated to "the second year of Emperor Nero", refers to him by his name and title. In Hebrew it is Nron Qsr (pronounced "Nerōn Kaisar"). In Latin it is Nro Qsr (pronounced "Nerō Kaisar").

Nron Qsr

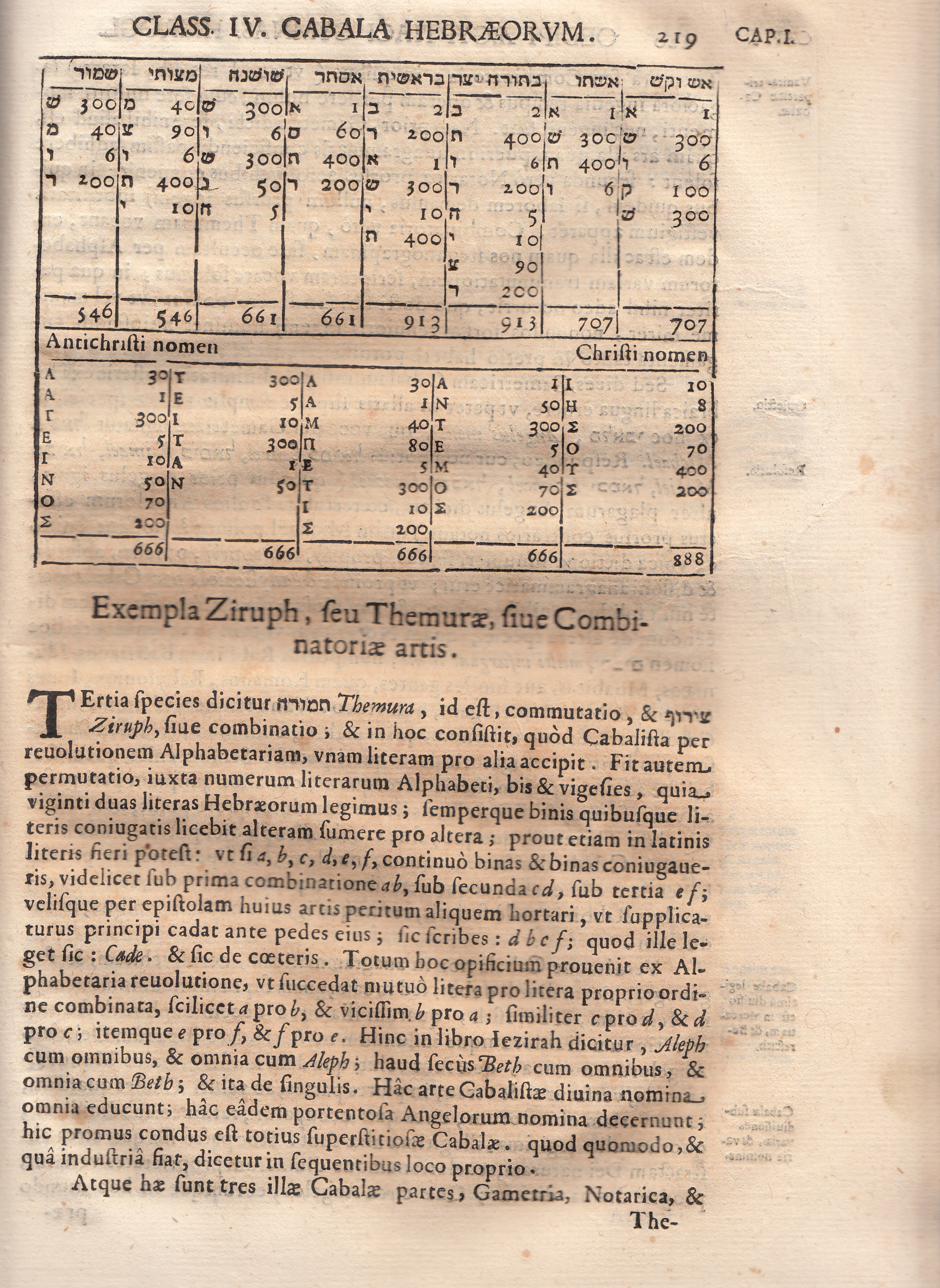
Gematria by Athanasius Kircher, calculating various "names of the beast" (Lageinos, Teitan, Lampetis, Antemos) that sum to 666, and summing Jesus' name to 888

The Greek version of the name and title transliterates into Hebrew as נרון קסר, and yields a numerical value of 666, as shown:

Resh (ר)	Samekh (ס)	Qoph (ק)	Nun (נ)	Vav (ו)	Resh (ר)	Nun (נ)	Sum
200	60	100	50	6	200	50	666

Nro Qsr

The Latin version of the name drops the second Nun (נ), so that it appears as Nro and transliterates into Hebrew as נרו קסר, yielding 616:

Resh (ר)	Samekh (ס)	Qoph (ק)	Vav (ו)	Resh (ר)	Nun (נ)	Sum
200	60	100	6	200	50	616

==== Muhammad ====
Gematria has also been used with the word Maometis (Ancient Greek: Μαομέτις); which scholars have described as a dubiously obscure Latinisation of a Greek transliteration of the Arabic name محمد (Muhammad). A leading proponent of the Maometis interpretation was Walmesley, the Roman Catholic bishop of Rama. Other proponents include 16–17th-century Catholic theologians Gilbert Genebrard, François Feuardent, and René Massuet. Maometis in Greek numerals totals 666:

Μ	α	ο	μ	ε	τ	ι	ς	Sum
40	1	70	40	5	300	10	200	666

Thom (1923) rejects "Maometis" as a valid translation, observing that

"of the seven different ways in which Muhammad's name is written in Euthymius and [by] the Byzantine historians, not one is the orthography in question".

None of the spellings actually used add up to 666 under Greek gematria.

Setton (1992) is critical of the idea: Muhammad was frequently defamed and made a subject of legends, taught by preachers as fact. For example, in order to show that Muhammad was the anti-Christ, it was asserted that Muhammad died not in the year 632 but in the year 666. In another variation on the theme the number "666" was also used to represent the period of time Muslims would hold sway of the land. In Quia maior, the encyclical calling for the Fifth Crusade, Euthymius Zygabenus and Zonaras wrote the name as "Maometh" and Cedrenus wrote the name "Mouchoumet" none of which is the "Maometis" in question.

==== King of Israel ====
Fr. Sloet of Holland proposed the title of Antichrist as king of Israel. He wrote that, "The Jews have ever looked forward to the Messiah as a great leader to restore the kingdom of Israel. They rejected Jesus because He did not fulfill this expectation... He will be king of a restored Israel, not only king, but the king par excellence. In Hebrew this idea could be expressed by the words (hammelek l'Yisrael), which have the requisite numerical value of 666; but in order to obtain this number kaph medial (כ) must be used in melek (king) instead of kaph final (ך)."

==== To Méga Thēríon ====
Aleister Crowley (1875–1947), the English ceremonial magician who founded the religion Thelema, self-identified as the Beast prophesied in Revelation and used the name Τὸ Μέγα Θηρίον (To Méga Thēríon), Greek for "The Great Beast", which adds up to 666 by isopsephy, the Greek form of gematria.

==== The Papacy ====
Several Protestant theologians, polemists and writers since the Reformation identified the number of the beast with the Pope. In 1602, Andreas Helwig would argue and popularize the claim that the alleged title of the Pope Vicarius Filii Dei ("Vicar of the Son of God") adds up to 666 in Roman numerals.

=== Solomon’s Splendor ===
In both 1 Kings 10:14 and 2 Chronicles 9:13 it reads: "The weight of the gold that Solomon received yearly was 666 talents". In a 2020 paper by Bodner & Strawn, they seem to indicate that the number 666 is associated with Solomon in his downfall, as it's "an important notice of this king's wayward and unjust practices [..] and eschewing of God's law". But they also conclude that "the origin of this number is not yet clear". And: "If Irenaeus was unclear about 666 already in the second century, the twenty-first century can be no more certain."

== Mark of the beast ==
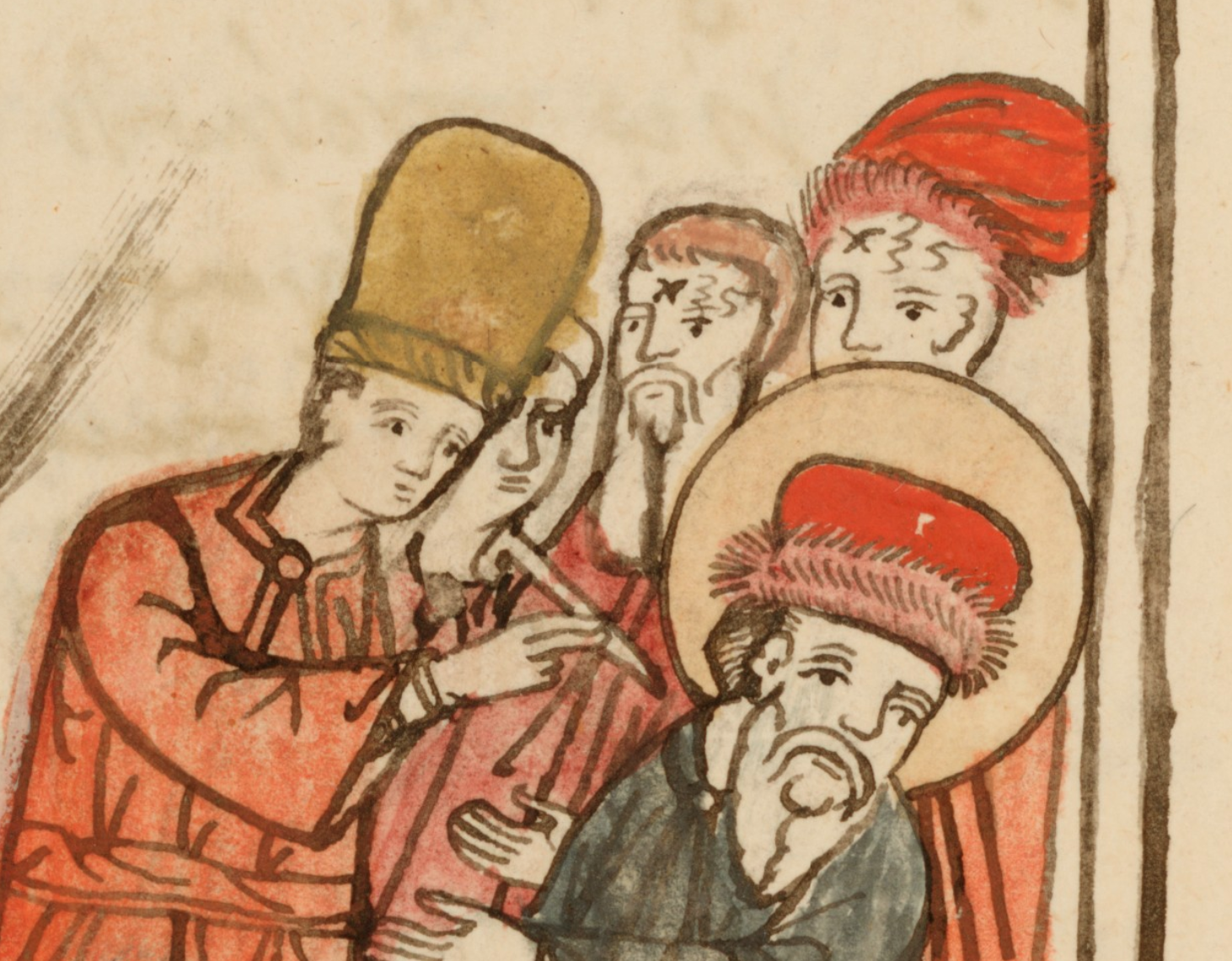
Putting the mark of χξς' (666) in peoples' forehead

Revelation also references a charagma (χάραγμα), translated as mark of the beast:

And he causeth all, both small and great, rich and poor, free and bond, to receive a mark in their right hand, or in their foreheads:
And that no man might buy or sell, save he that had the mark, or the name of the beast, or the number of his name.

— Revelation chapter 13:16–17

The Book of Revelation is commonly dated to about AD 95, as suggested by clues in the visions pointing to the reign of the emperor Domitian. Irenaeus (c. 130 – c. 202 AD), a former student of Polycarp who in turn had been a disciple of John the Apostle, knew that John had written the Revelation not that long ago, since he mentions it was written: "almost in our own generation, in the last years of Domitian's reign".

Irenaeus also wrote that it is "more certain, and less hazardous, to await the fulfilment of the prophecy, than to be making surmises" regarding the meaning of the number. In fact, he mentioned multiple other solutions of the number, like Evanthas (ΕΥΑΝΘΑΣ), Teitan (ΤΕΙΤΑΝ) and Lateinos (ΛΑΤΕΙΝΟΣ). On the latter, Irenaeus wrote further: "it is a very probable [solution], this being the name of the last kingdom [of the four seen by Daniel]".

Various secular authors and scholars on Christian eschatology have commented the meaning of the mark of the beast.

=== Preterist view ===
A common preterist view of the mark of the beast (focusing on the past) is the stamped image of the emperor's head on every coin of the Roman Empire: the stamp on the hand or in the mind of all, without which no one could buy or sell. New Testament scholar C.C. Hill notes, "It is far more probable that the mark symbolizes the all-embracing economic power of Rome, whose very coinage bore the emperor's image and conveyed his claims to divinity (e.g., by including the sun's rays in the ruler's portrait). It had become increasingly difficult for Christians to function in a world in which public life, including the economic life of the trade guilds, required participation in idolatry."

Adela Yarbro Collins further denotes that the refusal to use Roman coins resulted in the condition where "no man might buy or sell". A similar view is offered by Craig R. Koester. "As sales were made, people used coins that bore the images of Rome's gods and emperors. Thus each transaction that used such coins was a reminder that people were advancing themselves economically by relying on political powers that did not recognize the true God."

In 66 AD, when Nero was emperor—about the time some scholars say Revelation was written—the Jews revolted against Rome and coined their own money.

The passage is also seen as an antithetical parallelism to the Jewish institution of tefillin—Hebrew Bible texts worn bound to the arm and the forehead during daily prayer. Instead of binding their allegiance to God to their arm and head, the place is instead taken with people's allegiance to the beast.

=== Idealist view ===
Idealism, also known as the allegorical or symbolic approach, is an interpretation of the book of Revelation that sees the imagery of the book as non-literal symbols.

The idealist perspective on the number of the beast rejects gematria, envisioning the number not as a code to be broken, but a symbol to be understood. Idealists would contend that because there are so many names that can come to 666 and that most systems require converting names to other languages or adding titles when convenient, it has been impossible to come to a consensus.

Given that numbers are used figuratively throughout the Book of Revelation, idealists interpret this number figuratively as well. The common suggestion is that because seven is a number of "completeness" and is associated with the divine, six is "incomplete", and the three sixes are "inherently incomplete". The number is therefore suggestive that the Dragon and his beasts are profoundly deficient.

=== Historicist view ===
Historicists believe Revelation articulates a full range of the history of the Christian church, from John's day to the Second Coming of Christ. The author alludes to Daniel 2:28 and 2:45; Daniel's vision (Daniel 2) uses symbols giving a sequence of future events in history, from the Babylonian empire, through Medo-Persian period, Greece and Rome, continuing until the end of the current civilization.

The Augsburg confession given to Charles V in its 28th article stated "They likewise cite that the Sabbath has been changed to Sunday contrary to the Ten Commandments, as they see it, and no example is hyped and cited so much as the changing of the Sabbath, and they thereby wish to preserve the great authority of the church, since it has dispensed with the Ten Commandments and altered something in them." Rome was identified as the little horn power that changed times and laws (Daniel 7:25). Some Protestants such as the London minister Thomas Tillam and court physician Peter Chamberlen during the reformation began to identify Sunday worship as the Mark of the Beast.

This apocalyptic volume builds on Daniel's approach focusing on major points of Christian history: the cross of Christ (Rev. 5:6,9,12); the Second Coming (Rev. 14:14–16; 19:11–16); the 1,000 years in heaven (Rev. 20:4–6); the third advent of Christ to earth along with his loyal followers and the destruction of Satan and those who refused Christ (Rev. 20:7–15); and the creation of a new heavens and a new earth where death, sorrow, and sin cease and God dwells with His people (Rev. 21:1–8, 21:22–27; 22:1–5). The Book of Daniel is divided into two parts: The historical narrative of the captivity of Judah, and the prophecies pointing to both promised Messiah and the events of the end of the world. Attention to the text of Revelation aids the student of Bible prophecy by showing how the Apostle John and Jesus intended us to interpret Bible apocalyptic literature as found in Daniel.

Seventh-day Adventists taking this view believe that the 'mark of the beast' (but not the number 666) refers to a future, universal, legally enforced Sunday-sacredness. "Those who reject God's memorial of creatorship—the Bible Sabbath—choosing to worship and honor Sunday in the full knowledge that it is not God's appointed day of worship, will receive the 'mark of the beast'." "The Sunday Sabbath is purely a child of the Papacy. It is the mark of the beast." In the encyclical Dies Domini, Pope John Paul II stated that "The Sunday assembly is the privileged place of unity: it is the setting for the celebration of the sacramentum unitatis which profoundly marks the Church" [emphasis added] and this was also repeated in other catechisms and documents. Adventists note the old testament definition of a hand and forehead mark in texts like Exodus 13:9, Exodus 31:13-17, Ezekiel 20:12 provide important understanding of terms in Revelation's figurative language.

Seventh-day Adventist comparisons of Revelation's warnings with the Decalogue
Do not worship the beast	Commandment 1 Thou shalt have no other gods before me.
Do not worship the image of the beast	Commandment 2 Thou shalt not make unto thee any graven image, or any likeness of any thing that is in heaven above, or that is in the earth beneath, or that is in the water under the earth. Thou shalt not bow down thyself to them, nor serve them: for I the Lord thy God am a jealous God, visiting the iniquity of the fathers upon the children unto the third and fourth generation of them that hate me; And shewing mercy unto thousands of them that love me, and keep my commandments.
Do not receive the name of the beast	Commandment 3 Thou shalt not take the name of the Lord thy God in vain; for the Lord will not hold him guiltless that taketh his name in vain.
Do not honor Sunday with worship.	Commandment 4 Remember the sabbath day, to keep it holy. Six days shalt thou labour, and do all thy work: But the seventh day is the sabbath of the Lord thy God: in it thou shalt not do any work, thou, nor thy son, nor thy daughter, thy manservant, nor thy maidservant, nor thy cattle, nor thy stranger that is within thy gates: For in six days the Lord made heaven and earth, the sea, and all that in them is, and rested the seventh day: wherefore the Lord blessed the sabbath day, and hallowed it.

=== Futurist view ===
Some fundamentalist Christian groups, as well as various Christian writers in other traditions, interpret the mark as a requirement for all commerce to mean that the mark might actually be an object in the right hand or forehead with the function of a credit card, such as RFID microchip implants. Some of these groups believe the implantation of chips may be the imprinting of the mark of the beast, prophesied to be a requirement for all trade and a precursor to God's wrath. Similar objections were raised about barcodes upon their introduction.

During the COVID-19 pandemic, some groups associated COVID-19 vaccines and mask wearing with the mark of the beast, or that it was a microchip in the vaccine. Some religious leaders spoke out against this as a misinterpretation of Revelation 13:16-18. Medical institutions such as Hennepin County Medical Center noted this in their fact sheets about the vaccine. A similar version was spread by Marjorie Taylor Greene, who referred to vaccine passports as being the mark of the beast.

== Literature ==
=== Science fiction ===
In the 1980 science fiction novel The Number of the Beast, author Robert A. Heinlein writes that the actual number of the beast is not 666 but actually $(6^6)^6$ = 10,314,424,798,490,535,546,171,949,056, the number of accessible parallel universes in the novel.

== Numerical significance ==
=== Baháʼí Faith ===
In the writings of the Baháʼí Faith, 'Abdu'l-Bahá states that the numerical value given to the beast referred to the year when the Umayyad ruler Muawiyah I took office as Caliph in 661 AD. He opposed the Imamate, according to the beliefs of Shia Islam, who continued to pay the tax required of nonbelievers and were excluded from government and the military, and thus bore a social "mark".

=== Jehovah's Witnesses ===
Jehovah's Witnesses believe that the beast identified by the number 666 represents the world's unified governments in opposition to God. The beast is said to have "a human number" in that the represented governments are of a human origin rather than spirit entities. The number 666 is said to identify "gross shortcoming and failure in the eyes of Jehovah", in contrast to the number 7, which is seen as symbolizing perfection.

== Fear and superstition ==
The fear of 666 (six hundred sixty-six) as the number of the beast is called hexakosioihexekontahexaphobia. Cases of this fear include:

- In 1989, Nancy and Ronald Reagan, when moving to their home in the Bel-Air section of Los Angeles after the latter left the presidency of the United States that same year, had its address—666 St. Cloud Road—changed to 668 St. Cloud Road.
- In 2003, U.S. Route 666 in New Mexico was changed to U.S. Route 491. A New Mexico spokesperson stated, "The devil's out of here, and we say goodbye and good riddance."
- Some women expressed concern about giving birth on June 6, 2006 (6/6/06).
- In February 2013, a man quit his job after discovering that the last three digits of his employee identification number, as shown on his W-2 form, were the "Satanic" number 666. The man had requested that his ID number be changed to end in 668, but the company continued to use the number that ended in 666. "If you accept that number, you sell your soul to the devil," he said.
- In November 2013, Codie Thacker—a cross-country runner at Whitley County High School in Williamsburg, Kentucky—refused to run in her Kentucky High School Athletic Association regional meet, forfeiting a chance at qualifying for the state championships, when her coach drew bib number 666.
- In 2015, US Representative Joe Barton had the number of a legislative bill he had introduced changed from 666 to 702 because "the original bill number carried many different negative connotations", according to a spokesperson.
- In 2017, church leaders in Papua New Guinea were concerned by newspaper reports that the Governor-General had been requested to sign 666 writs for an upcoming election. They were reassured by the Electoral Commissioner that the number merely reflected 6 copies of each writ for 111 electorates.
- On October 13, 2017, a Friday the 13th, Finnair flight 666 departed from Copenhagen to Helsinki (IATA airport code HEL) for the last time, before being renumbered to 954. Since 2006, the flight had been scheduled on a Friday the 13th on 21 occasions. A Finnair spokesperson said that the flight had not been renumbered due to superstitious passengers.
- In 2021, Brookfield Properties decided to renumber the office building at 666 Fifth Avenue in Midtown Manhattan, which was undergoing renovation after being acquired from the Kushner family, to 660 Fifth Avenue. When completed in 1957, the skyscraper had featured a red neon display of the number 666 at the top which could be seen from various locations in the city.
- In 2023, PKS Gdynia, a Polish bus operator, decided to renumber line 666, which runs to Hel, Poland, a town on the Hel Peninsula, to 669. FlixBus adopted the 666 number in 2026 for a route to Hel, deliberately choosing the number as a publicity stunt to promote the route.
- Social Security Numbers in the United States can not begin with 000, 666, or 900-999.

== See also ==
- 666 (number)
- 2300 day prophecy
- Biblical numerology
- Classical antiquity
- Christian eschatology
- Curse and mark of Cain
- Day-year principle
- Fifth Monarchists
- Four Horsemen of the Apocalypse
- Human branding
- List of phobias, including Numerophobia
- Names for the number 0
- Numerology and the Church Fathers § Irenaeus
- Prophecy of Seventy Weeks
- Tetraphobia
- Therion (Thelema)
- Whore of Babylon
