= 666 (number) =

← 665	666	667 →
- List of numbers; Integers; ← 0 100 200 300 400 500 600 700 800 900 →
- Cardinal: six hundred sixty-six
- Ordinal: 666th (six hundred sixty-sixth)
- Factorization: 2 × 3^{2} × 37
- Divisors: 1, 2, 3, 6, 9, 18, 37, 74, 111, 222, 333, 666
- Greek numeral: ΧΞϚ´
- Roman numeral: DCLXVI
- Greek prefix: ἑξακόσιοι ἑξήκοντα ἕξ hexakósioi hexēkonta héx
- Latin prefix: sescenti sexaginta sex
- Binary: 1010011010_{2}
- Ternary: 220200_{3}
- Senary: 3030_{6}
- Octal: 1232_{8}
- Duodecimal: 476_{12}
- Hexadecimal: 29A_{16}
- Chinese numeral: 六百六十六
- Devanagari numeral: ६६६

666 (six hundred [and] sixty-six or triple six) is the natural number following 665 and preceding 667. It is a composite number.

In Christianity, 666 is referred to in most manuscripts of chapter 13 of the Book of Revelation of the New Testament as the "number of the beast" or "number of (a) man".

== In mathematics ==
666 is the sum of the first thirty-six natural numbers, which makes it a triangular number:

$$\sum_{i=1}^{36} i = 1 + 2 + 3 + \cdots + 34 + 35 + 36 = 666$$.

666 is the largest triangular number that is also a repdigit. It is also a smith number.

== In Christian religion ==
=== Number of the beast ===
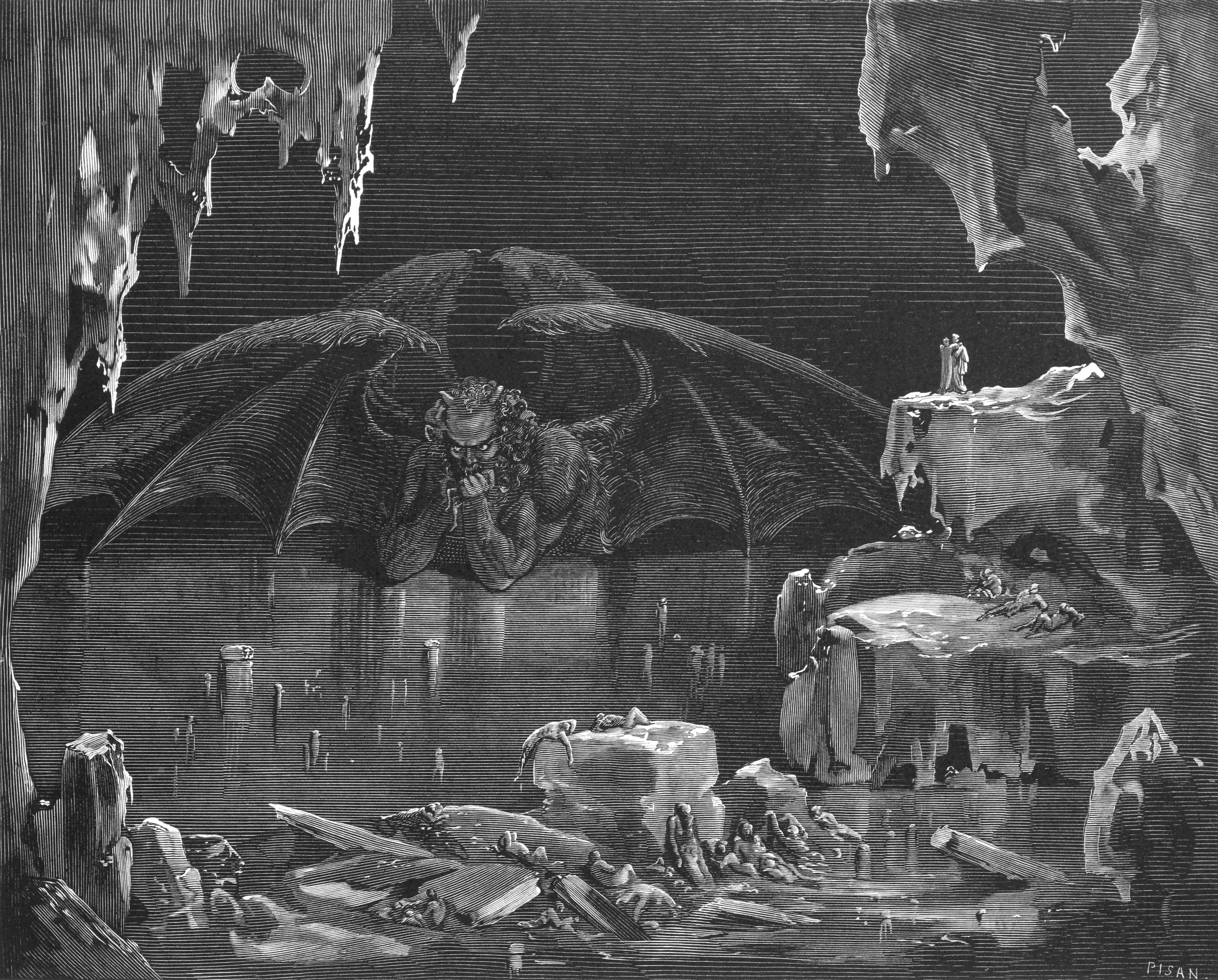
666 is often associated with Satan, who is illustrated here in an engraved interpretation by Gustave Doré.

In the Textus Receptus manuscripts of the New Testament, the Book of Revelation (13:17–18) cryptically asserts 666 to be "the man's number" or "the number of a man" (depending on how the text is translated) associated with the Beast, an antagonistic creature that appears briefly about two-thirds into the apocalyptic vision. Some manuscripts of the original Koine Greek, such as Editio Regia use the symbols χξϛ chi xi stigma (or χξϝ with a digamma), while later translations of the New Testament, such as Westcott and Hort, spell out the number in words.

In modern popular culture, 666 has become one of the most widely recognized symbols for the Antichrist or, alternatively Satanism. Earnest references to the number occur both among apocalypticist Christian groups and in explicitly anti-Christian subcultures. References in contemporary Western art or literature are, more likely than not, intentional references to the Beast symbolism. Such popular references are therefore too numerous to list.

It is common to see the symbolic role of the integer 666 transferred to the numerical digit sequence 6-6-6. Some people take the Satanic associations of 666 so seriously that they actively avoid things related to 666 or the digits 6-6-6. This is known as hexakosioihexekontahexaphobia.

There is a broad consensus in contemporary scholarship that the number of the beast refers to the Roman emperor Nero, who reigned from 55 to 68 AD. The Greek version of his name (Νέρων Καῖσαρ, "Neron Kaisar") transliterates into Hebrew as נרון קסר (NRON QSR), and, using gematria, yields a numerical value of 666. His Latin name, "Nero Caesar", transliterated as נרו קסר (NRO QSR), produces the number 616 instead, which is also cited as the Number of the Beast in some early biblical manuscripts.

=== Other occurrences ===
- In the Bible, 666 is the number of talents of gold Solomon collected each year (see 1 Kings 10:14 and 2 Chronicles 9:13).
- In the Bible, 666 is the number of Adonikam's descendants who return to Jerusalem and Judah from the Babylonian exile (see Ezra 2:13).

== In other fields ==
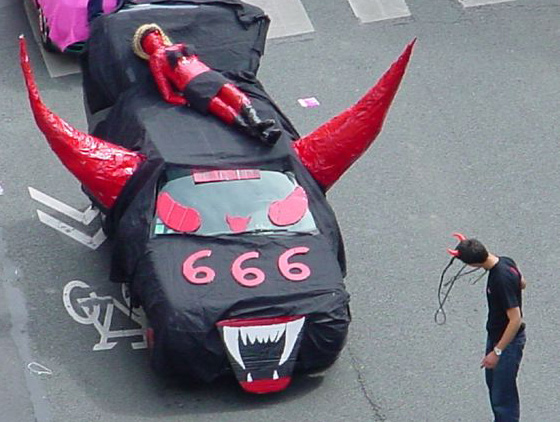
A 666 float in a Paris street parade

- The Roman numeral for 666, DCLXVI, has exactly one occurrence of all symbols whose value is less than 1000 in decreasing order (D = 500, C = 100, L = 50, X = 10, V = 5, I = 1).
- The Number of the Beast, the 1982 album by English heavy metal band Iron Maiden, references 666 in its title and the album's title song.
- Is the magic sum, or sum of the magic constants of a six by six magic square, any row or column of which adds up to 111.
- Is the sum of all the numbers on a roulette wheel (0 through 36). This is a corollary of the fact that the number is a Triangular number, as mentioned earlier.
- Was a winning lottery number in the 1980 Pennsylvania Lottery scandal, in which equipment was tampered to favor a 4 or 6 as each of the three individual random digits.
- Was the original name of the Macintosh SevenDust computer virus that was discovered in 1998. It is also the name of an extension that SevenDust can add to an uninfected Macintosh.
- The number is a frequent visual element of Aryan Brotherhood tattoos.
- Aleister Crowley adopted the title "the Beast 666". As such, 666 is also associated with him, his work, and his religious philosophy of Thelema.
- Molar mass of the high-temperature superconductor YBa_{2}Cu_{3}O_{7}.
- In Chinese numerology, the number is considered to be lucky and is often displayed in shop windows and neon signs. In China, 666 can mean "everything goes smoothly" (the number six has the same pronunciation as the character 溜, which means "smooth".
- Is commonly used by Internet service providers to blackhole traffic using BGP communities.
- 666 Fifth Avenue in New York City, which was bought for $1.8 billion in 2007, was the most expensive real estate deal in New York's history.
- 666 dating rule: a varied manosphere trope exploring the notion of high standards of modern western women wherein a man dating is required to be six feet in height, making a six figure salary, six-pack abdomen, a six-hundred horsepower vehicle, six years of higher education and having a six inch phallus.
- 666 kHz - a radio frequency on amplitude modulation/medium wave broadcast band using the Geneva Frequency Plan of 1975.

== See also ==
- Numerology
- Biblical numerology
- Gematria
- 777 (number)
- 999 (number)
