= 12 Days of Brumalia =

The 12 Days of Brumalia
- Misprinted cover art featured on the first CDs

Studio album by The Residents
- Released: June 21st, 2004
- Length: 39:10
- Label: Ralph America, MVD Audio (re-issue)
- Producer: The Cryptic Corporation

The Residents chronology
Demons Dance Alone (2002)	The 12 Days of Brumalia (2004)	Animal Lover (2005)

The 12 Days of Brumalia was a 2003-2004 "internet event" presented by The Residents. The event saw Residents composer Hardy Fox anonymously upload thirteen downloadable MP3s to Residents.com over a span of two weeks between December 24, 2003 and January 5, 2004. The songs were shortly after released on a limited edition CD through The Residents' mail order label Ralph America. A wider release followed on its 10th anniversary through MVD Audio.

== Background ==
=== Digital Rollout ===
Although never released as such, The 12 Days of Brumalia has been described by Residents spokesman Homer Flynn and biographer Ian Shirley as a Hardy Fox solo project attributed to The Residents.

The project launched on December 24, 2003, three months after the conclusion of the group's Demons Dance Alone tour, which ran from October 25, 2002 to September 28, 2003. Hardy Fox, who had performed with the group since their earliest shows, was notably absent from the Demons tour, with his typical duties being performed by Eric Drew Feldman.

Lasting until January 5, 2004, thirteen downloadable MP3s to Residents.com were released part of The Residents' 'Brumalia' celebrations, The Residents' interpretation of a 13 day festive holiday season, inspired by "The Twelve Days of Christmas." "Big Hand," was later revisited for the Tweedles album. Each download would be accompanied by an image incorporating various religious imagery and water, drawing attention to many different faiths which celebrate the winter solstice. The album was later covered on the Grandpa Gio blog, compared to the group's Santa Dog series, which had also been free holiday releases which "announce [The Residents'] new perspective." (Note: The Grandpa Gio blog was promoted on The Residents website throughout the 2010s, it supposedly featured contemporary reviews for every Residents project, unpublished by its author.)

=== Physical Release ===
On April 27, 2004, it was announced through Residents.com that a re-mixed The 12 Days of Brumalia CD would be available from Ralph America, The Residents' mail order / online purchase label. The CD was officially available to purchase on June 10, and featured a surprise bonus track "The True Meaning of Brumalia." The CD was a limited edition of 1,000 numbered copies, although the first 475 featured misprinted covers, and un-numbered versions were made available as replacements. Although the download versions of the songs were titled uniquely, physical releases name each track "Day 1," "Day 2," etc.

MVD Audio re-released the CD for its 10th anniversary in 2014, making 12 Days of Brumalia widely available for the first time. This version features the entirety of The Residents' 1993 Prelude To The Teds EP as bonus tracks, as well as a recent remix of the Live at the Fillmore version of "Jack The Boneless Boy." Despite these additions, the original CD's closing track, "The Feast Of Epiphany," is absent.

Brumalia is considered by Homer Flynn and Ian Shirley to be a precursor to Hardy Fox's 'Charles Bobuck' solo albums several years later.

"Charles Bobuck – has more creative energy and has been prolific in creating more music than can fit into The Residents format. So there have always been things like the Brumalia series that Chuck has done that got labeled as Residents." - Homer Flynn, 2015

== Track listing ==
All tracks are written by The Residents.

No.	Title	Length
1.	"Partridge Pairing"	3:24
2.	"Turtle Dove"	2:52
3.	"Chicken of the Oui"	2:10
4.	"Calling Bird"	2:58
5.	"Golden Rings"	2:19
6.	"Lying Goose"	1:52
7.	"Swami Swan"	2:10
8.	"Maid Being Milked" (Remix of "Jelly Jack" from Live at the Fillmore)	3:36
9.	"Wiggling Wahines"	2:02
10.	"Leaping and Lords" (Alternative version of "Betty's Body" from Demons Dance Alone)	2:53
11.	"Pieta's Piper" (Remix of "The Sleepwalker" from Demons Dance Alone)	2:52
12.	"Big Hand"	2:29
13.	"The Feast of the Epiphany"	5:38
14.	"The True Meaning of Brumalia"	1:55
Total length:		39:10

=== 2014 bonus tracks ===
No.	Title	Length
14.	"Teddy"	4:00
15.	"I Tried To Cry"	2:06
16.	"The Cry Of A Crow"	3:24
17.	"Struggle"	3:02
18.	"Boneless Boy" (Single remix by Charles Bobuck)	3:35
Total length:		53:22

== Personnel ==
Adapted from CD release

- Guests – Nolan Cook, Carla Fabrizio, Molly Harvey, Toby Dammit, Eric Drew Feldman, M. Salvator, Pavers (Note: Salvatore and Pavers are only credited on the 2014 release)
- Produced by – The Cryptic Corporation
