= The Ghost of Hope =

Studio album by the Residents
- Released: March 24, 2017
- Recorded: 2014–2016
- Genres: Dark ambient; rock
- Length: 47:17
- Labels: MVD Audio, Cherry Red Records
- Producers: Eric Drew Feldman; The Residents

The Residents chronology
Lonely Teenager (2011)	The Ghost of Hope (2017)	Intruders (2018)

The Ghost of Hope is a studio album by American art rock band the Residents. It is based around historical train wrecks. It was their last work with Hardy Fox before his death in 2018.

== Background ==
The Ghost of Hope was The Residents' first vocal album of entirely newly written material since 2008's The Bunny Boy. During that gap, the group focused on touring their 'Randy, Chuck & Bob' trilogy of live shows, starting in 2010 with Talking Light and concluding in July 2016 with Shadowland. During this time, the group released four new full-length albums: Postcards from Patmos, Hades, Lonely Teenager, and Mush-Room.

Postcards from Patmos and Hades were instrumental albums created as atmospheric soundtracks, with Patmos being the soundtrack to their 2008 Bunny Boy web show, sold exclusively on tour dates, and Hades as soundtrack for an unrealized art gallery installation, released as a digital exclusive. Lonely Teenager was a studio adaption of the Talking Light live show and only featured two newly written tracks, both of which had been debuted in the live show; the rest of the album's material consisted of re-recordings of selections of the band's back catalog. Mush-Room, released in 2013, was an instrumental album written for the Belgian dance group Needcompany. During this time group member Hardy Fox began anonymously releasing solo material under the persona of Charles Bobuck (a character from the Randy, Chuck & Bob trilogy). Seven Charles Bobuck albums were released on CD between 2012 and 2016, with additional digital downloads.

According to The Residents' spokesperson Homer Flynn, the group had wanted to create a train-inspired album for a long time, and were pushed to do so by one member in particular. Despite this insistence, the group hadn’t been able to find an entry point for the concept until 2013, when someone suggested making an album on historical train wrecks. The group liked the idea and began searching for a book on the subject through Amazon, before eventually landing on Death by Train, a Kindle collection of 50-60 newspaper articles detailing train wrecks written between the late 1800s to the early 1900s. Eventually, the Residents selected 10-12 of these articles to base the album upon. The group loved the elegant language of the period and wanted to contrast it against the horror of the events it was describing.

Speaking in character as Charles Bobuck, Fox stated that he had written the music for the album in 2014 and that the recording process was delayed by constant touring commitments. Fox had intended to have the album finished by spring of 2015 and released in September of that year. He had also planned to help his replacement Eric Drew Feldman arrange a live version in the fall of that year, but since the Shadowland tour continued to push The Ghost of Hope aside, Fox left the group out of boredom. The Shadowland tour lasted from May 2014 to July 2016. After the album's release, Fox (again speaking as Bobuck) said, "There are bits and pieces that I remember having written scattered through it. My playing is minimal."

Flynn noted that the album sonically harkened back to their 1979 album Eskimo, particularly the idea of constructing narrative throughout soundscape. The album also contained a booklet detailing the real-life stories behind the songs. The album featured Eric Drew Feldman collaborating with the group. The Ghost of Hope was Hardy Fox's final work with the Residents.

On March 7, 2017, Billboard unveiled a video teaser for the album. The album was also proceeded by a six-show residency at the Blue Note in Tokyo.

== Critical reception ==
Professional ratings
Review scores
Source	Rating
All About the Rock	8/10 stars
Classic Rock	4/5 stars

Reviewing an early copy of the album for Louder Than War in February 2017, Ian Canty mentioned that "You can't really review this CD as you would a normal LP" and that "you are better off approaching it as one would an audio book of short stories". John Deux for All About the Rock said that the album was "mind blowing" and that he could not express how impressed he was with the album. David Stubbs for Classic Rock gave the album four out of five stars and described it as "a tribute to the reckless optimism of humanity in its ongoing technological aspirations" A few months later, Kieron Tyler, writing in an interview with the group's spokesperson Homer Flynn for The Arts Desk, described The Ghost of Hope as "balanc(ing) the horrific with things that are a little funny".

== Tour ==
On March 30, 2017, the Residents staged a live show based on the album at the Exploratorium in San Francisco, California, amidst their In Between Dreams tour, which lasted from March 3, 2017, to February 10, 2019, and featured two songs from The Ghost of Hope.

== Track listing ==
No.	Title	Length
1.	"Horrors of the Night"	7:25
2.	"The Crash at Crush"	6:33
3.	"Death Harvest"	7:23
4.	"Shroud of Flames"	5:43
5.	"The Great Circus Train Wreck of 1918"	7:03
6.	"Train vs Elephant" (Not included on LP version)	4:07
7.	"Killed at a Crossing"	9:01

== Personnel ==
- The Residents – music
- Carla Fabrizio, Laurie Hall, Peter Whitehead and Isabelle Barbier – vocals
- Nolan Cook – guitar
- Eric Drew Feldman – additional instruments and computers

Production

- Produced by Eric Drew Feldman and the Residents
- Mixed by Gabriel Shepard and Eric Drew Feldman
- Cover art – Poor Know Graphics
