= Our Finest Flowers =

Studio album by the Residents
- Released: 1992
- Length: 49:02

The Residents chronology
Freak Show (1990)	Our Finest Flowers (1992)	Gingerbread Man (1994)

Professional ratings
Review scores
Source	Rating
AllMusic	3/5 stars

Our Finest Flowers is an album by American art rock group the Residents, released in 1992. For their 20th anniversary, instead of releasing a greatest hits compilation, they decided to release an album of new songs created by combining various components of different past songs. The Residents borrowed from not only their own past original songs, but some of their known cover songs and songs by frequent collaborators Snakefinger and Renaldo and the Loaf. The liner notes refer to the album as "Celebrating Twenty Long Dreary Years of Obscure Stardom".

== Liner notes ==
The liner notes from the original album explain the album as follows:

What's a group to do when its twentieth birthday rolls around; when the only comparable lasting musical units are the Grateful Dead or The Rolling Stones, and they both have had members die, for christsake. Some people thought a nice collection of "greatest hits" would be a suitable observance. So The Residents tried to write down their "greatest hits" until suddenly one of the guys got a stomach ache and threw up on the song listing. The guy that made the mess had to wash the list off and in the process pretty well smeared the ink all around the paper. Everybody thought it was funny so they started reading the words, or at least what the words looked like. "Perfect Goat," one said. "I think we should put that on our album"
They knew the vomit was no accident, it was an omen. They tore the paper into little pieces and dropped them onto the floor. It was still wet. Some of the pieces you couldn't read anymore, but they didn't seem to care. Somehow, ideas came from those torn slips. And sure enough, "Perfect Goat" did make it on the album, along with fifteen other tracks that Dr. Frankenstein would have surely been proud to have stitched together. Yes, these are new songs. Just like all good pop music, there is something familiar about them, something friendly. But as you listen, never forget that vomit is at their core: twenty long years of painful regurgitation.

== Track listing ==
No.	Title	Original Source Songs	Length
1.	"Gone Again"	Interpolates: * "Nobody Laughs When They Leave" from Freak Show* "Walrus Hunt" from Eskimo* "Loss of Innocence" from Commercial Album	3:59
2.	"The Sour Song"	Interpolates: * "Vinegar" from The Big Bubble* "The Simple Song" from Commercial Album* "Jailhouse Rock" from "This Is A Man's Man's Man's World" (single)	2:42
3.	"Six Amber Things"	Interpolates: * "Amber" from Commercial Album* "Six Things to a Cycle" from Fingerprince	2:33
4.	"Mr. Lonely"	Interpolates: * "Happy Home" from The Tunes of Two Cities* "The Man in the Dark Sedan" from Snakefinger's Greener Postures	2:30
5.	"Perfect Goat"	Interpolates: * "The Making of a Soul" from Not Available* "Perfect Love" from Commercial Album* "Golden Goat" from Snakefinger's Greener Postures* "Shut Up Shut Up" from Commercial Album	2:49
6.	"Blue Tongues"	Interpolates: * "Smelly Tongues" from Meet the Residents* "Blue Rosebuds" from Duck Stab	3:42
7.	"Jungle Bunny"	Interpolates: * "Picnic in the Jungle" from Snakefinger's Chewing Hides the Sound* "Monkey & Bunny" from Title in Limbo	2:48
8.	"I'm Dreaming of a White Sailor"	Interpolates: * "The Sailor Song" from Title in Limbo* "The Shoe Salesman" from Title in Limbo	3:10
9.	"...Or Maybe a Marine"	Interpolates: * "Give it to Someone Else" from Commercial Album* "Handful of Desire" from Commercial Album	2:48
10.	"Kick a Picnic"	Interpolates: * "Picnic in the Jungle" from Snakefinger's Chewing Hides the Sound* "Aircraft Damage" from Santa Dog	2:26
11.	"Dead Wood"	Interpolates: * "Mahogany Wood" from Title in Limbo* "Die Stay Go" from Big Bubble	4:25
12.	"Baby Sister"	Interpolates: * "Little Sister" from The King & Eye	3:44
13.	"Forty-Four No More"	Interpolates: * "Forty-Four" from Cube E: Live in Holland	3:36
14.	"He Also Serves"	Interpolates: * Miscellaneous songs from God in Three Persons (specificity lyrics from “The Service”* “The ringmaster’s voice from Freak Show introduces the song	2:46
15.	"Ship of Fools"	Interpolates: * "Don't Tread on Me" from Mark of the Mole* "Pain & Pleasure" from God in Three Persons* "Ship's a Goin' Down" from Not Available	4:16
16.	"Be Kind to U-WEB Footed Friends"	Interpolates: * "Stars and Stripes Forever" from Stars & Hank Forever!	0:48
Total length:			49:02
