= Twenty Twisted Questions =

Video by The Residents
- Released: May 28, 1992
- Recorded: 1972–1992
- Genres: Experimental, avant-garde, noise rock, multimedia
- Length: 60 minutes
- Label: Voyager Company

Twenty Twisted Questions is a 1992 LaserDisc by American avant-garde group "The Residents". It is a compilation of the band's history up to Freak Show, their then multimedia project. The footage was released in Europe as a PAL VHS without the LaserDisc features.

== Critical response ==
At the time, Entertainment Weekly video critic Ty Burr rated it a C+. He said that the video "is for undiscriminating fans only: It's the high-tech version of a souvenir T-shirt."

== Track listing ==
=== Side 1 ===
==== Video and Film Art ====
1. The Third Reich 'n Roll
  1. ("Swastikas on Parade")
2. "Eloise"
3. One Minute Movies
  1. "Moisture"
  2. "Act of Being Polite"
  3. "Perfect Love"
  4. "Simple Song"
4. "This Is a Man's Man's Man's World"
5. "Earth Vs. The Flying Saucers"
6. "Don't Be Cruel"
7. Freak Show
  1. "Everyone Comes to the Freak Show"
  2. "Harry the Head"
  3. "Nobody Laughs When They Leave"

=== Side 2 ===
==== Performance Art ====
1. The Mole Show (Narrated by Penn Jillette)
2. The 13 Anniversary Show
  1. "Where Is She?"
3. Cube-E
  1. "Buckaroo Blues"
  2. "Black Barry"
  3. "The Baby King"

==== Music and Graphic Arts ====
Featured discography from The Residents from 1972 (Santa Dog) to 1991 (Freak Show)

==== End Credits, Bonus Track ====
1. Production credits
2. Ty's Freak Show (This track was recorded on November 17, 1991, using NEC's video editing software at the Fairmont Hotel in San Jose, CA)

== Production credits ==
- Directed by The Residents
- Produced by The Cryptic Corp.
- Executive producer: Michael Nash, The Voyager Co.
- Music written and performed by The Residents and Published by Pale Pachyderm, [BMI] Except where noted
- Edited by Skip Sweeny, Video Free America; Laurie Schmidt, San Francisco Production Group
- Technical director: Morgan Holly
- Production coordinator: Kim Finneran
- The Voyager Company
- Package design by Rex Ray
- Liner notes by Barry Walters
- Music selected by Uncle Willie
- Special thanks: Chris McGregor, Ty Roberts, Light Source/NEC, OSC/Digidesign, Apple Computer, New Tek Inc.
- (Copyright notices for track optimized for frame by frame feature.)
