= Buckaroo Blues =

Studio album by The Residents
- Released: January 1989
- Recorded: 1988
- Label: UWEB

The Residents chronology
Santa Dog 88 (1988)	Buckaroo Blues (1989)	The King & Eye (1989)

Professional ratings
Review scores
Source	Rating
AllMusic	3/5 stars

Buckaroo Blues is a fan club exclusive CD by The Residents, collecting studio recordings based on two work-in-progress live shows the group had been preparing throughout 1988. The majority of the material is a studio representation of a live appearance the group had made at Boudisque Records in Amsterdam on November 26, 1988, with the final track being the overture for a God in Three Persons live show, which remained unrealised until 2019.

The opening suite features interpretations of Western folk songs and cowboy poems. The album was available only to members of the Residents' fan club, UWEB.

== Track listing ==
All tracks are written by The Residents except where noted.

No.	Title	Writer(s)	Length
1.	"Buckaroo Blues"		19:46
2.	"Land of 1000 Dances / Double Shot"	Chris Kenner / Don Smith / Cyril Vetter	13:09
3.	"God In Three Person's Over"		9:56
Total length:			42:51
