= The Ughs! =

Studio album by The Residents
- Released: November 3, 2009
- Genre: Avant-rock
- Length: 57:33
- Label: MVD Audio

The Residents chronology
Postcards from Patmos (2008)	The Ughs! (2009)	Arkansas (2009)

Professional ratings
Review scores
Source	Rating
Allmusic	3/5 stars

The Ughs! is an instrumental album by The Residents that was released on November 3, 2009. The songs on the album consists of segments from The Voice of Midnight but structured in a new way that does not need a narrative over it.

During the process of making their 2007 album, The Voice of Midnight, the band decided to create an alter ego called The Ughs! so that they could allow themselves to act out in new roles.

== Track listing ==
No.	Title	Length
1.	"The Ughs"	2:20
2.	"The Dancing Duck"	4:18
3.	"Floating Down the Nile, Pt. 2"	5:48
4.	"Squeaky Wheels"	3:11
5.	"The Lonely Lotus"	6:12
6.	"Rendering the Bacon"	5:15
7.	"The Horns of Haynesville"	9:58
8.	"The Wondering Jew"	6:04
9.	"Charlie Chan"	4:05
10.	"In the Dark"	10:22
Total length:		57:33
