= Roadworms: The Berlin Sessions =

Studio album by The Residents
- Released: September 12, 2000
- Recorded: February 3, 1999
- Length: 52:21
- Label: East Side Digital
- Producer: Cryptic Corporation, Euro Ralph

The Residents chronology
Wormwood: Curious Stories from the Bible (1998)	Roadworms: The Berlin Sessions (2000)	Icky Flix (2001)

Professional ratings
Review scores
Source	Rating
Allmusic	link

Roadworms: The Berlin Sessions is an album by American art rock band The Residents, released in 2000. During the tour supporting the Wormwood album, many of the songs changed quite a bit. Roadworms is an attempt to capture, live in the studio, the way the music was being played in concert. For those wanting to hear the concert versions, a limited edition double CD entitled Wormwood Live was released in 1999.

== Track listing ==
1. "Un-American Band" – 2:59
2. "How to Get a Head. Road" – 5:20
3. "Hanging by His Hair. Road" – 3:28
4. "God's Magic Finger. Road" – 3:20
5. "Tent Peg in the Temple. Road" – 4:09
6. "Fire Fall. Road" – 5:34
7. "Cain and Abel. Road" – 4:15
8. "Dinah and the Unclean Skin. Road" – 4:04
9. "Abraham. Road" – 6:44
10. "Burn Baby, Burn. Road" – 3:42
11. "Judas Saves. Road" – 8:46

== Personnel ==
- Mr. Skull – vocals
- Molly Harvey – vocals
- The Residents – percussion, guitar, keyboards, treated vocals, bass
- Tony Janssen – engineer
- Euro Ralph – producer
- Cryptic Corporation – producer
