= Wormwood Live =

Live album by The Residents
- Released: 1999
- Recorded: June–July 1999
- Studio: Recorded live across Europe
- Genre: Avant garde
- Label: Ralph America

The Residents chronology
Wormwood: Curious Stories from the Bible (1998)	Wormwood Live (1999)	Refused (1999)

Wormwood Live is a 1999 live album by the Residents. Recorded in Germany, it features the full live performance of songs from their album, Wormwood: Curious Stories from the Bible. Studio versions of the live performances were later released as Roadworms: The Berlin Sessions. This live album was released by Ralph America in a limited edition of 1200 copies.

== Track listing ==
1. "In the Beginning"
2. "Welcome to Wormwood"
3. "Mr. Skull's Rave: 1"
4. "How to Get a Head"
5. "Mr. Misery"
6. "Tent Peg in the Temple"
7. "Mr. Skull's Rave: 2"
8. "God's Magic Finger"
9. "Dinah and the Unclean Skin"
10. "Cain and Abel"
11. "Mr. Skull's Rave: 3"
12. "Burn Baby Burn"
13. "Fire Fall"
14. "King of Kings"
15. "Skull Prayer"
16. "Mr. Skull's Rave: 4"
17. "Abraham"
18. "Bridegroom of Blood"
19. "Mr. Skull's Rave: 5"
20. "David"
21. "Judas Saves"
22. "Old Time Religion (Epilogue)"
23. "Jesus Loves Me (Exit Music)"
