= Masood Sharif Khan Khattak =

Pakistani politician (1950–2023)

Masood Sharif Khan مسعود شریف خان خٹک
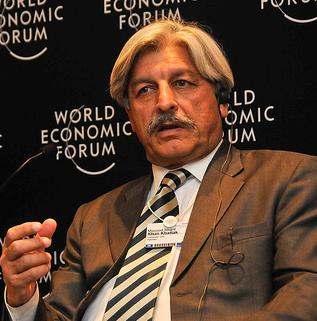
- Masood Sharif in 2009 at the World Economic Forum

Director General of the Intelligence Bureau
- In office 1993–1996
- President: Farooq Leghari
- Prime Minister: Benazir Bhutto

Directorate-General of the Federal Investigation Agency
- In office 1992–1993
- President: Ghulam Ishaq Khan
- Prime Minister: Nawaz Sharif

Personal details
- Born: Masood Sharif Khan Khattak; 5 June 1950 Billand Kala, Karak, North-West Frontier Province, Pakistan
- Died: 29 January 2023 (aged 72) Karak
- Party: Pakistan Peoples Party; Pakistan Tehreek-e-Insaf
- Spouse(s): Alive, Widowed
- Children: Hassan Sharif Khan Khattak, two Daughters
- Education: Command and Staff College; Pakistan Military Academy; Cadet College Petaro
- Occupation: Politician and intelligence officer
- Nickname: Major Khan

Military service
- Allegiance: Pakistan
- Branch/service: Pakistan Army
- Years of service: 1968–1986
- Rank: Major
- Unit: Armoured Corps
- Battles/wars: Indo-Pakistani War of 1971

Masood Sharif Khan Khattak (Urdu: مسعود شریف خان خٹک; 5 June 1950 – 29 January 2023) was a Pakistani civilian intelligence officer and the first Director General of the Intelligence Bureau (I.B). He served as the Vice-President of the Pakistan Peoples Party (PPP) and the Pakistan Peoples Party Parliamentarians (PPPP) under the leadership of Prime Minister of Pakistan Benazir Bhutto. He also led a famous intelligence operation named Midnight Jackals, which thwarted a military coup attempt of the elected PPP government in 1990. He was imprisoned in 1996 by the government of Farooq Leghari where he was charged with launching widespread wiretapping against government officials.

In 2002 he was appointed the Senior Vice-President of Pakistan People's Party Parliamentarian. He was defeated in the 2002 general elections by a candidate of the Muttahida Majlis-e-Amal in his home constituency NA-15(KARAK KPK). He resigned from the PPP in 2007 in protest against political arrangements (In famous NRO deal) of Pakistan Peoples Party Parliamentarians with Gen. Musharaf. He joined Pakistan Tehreek-e-Insaf on 11 November after the meeting with chairman Imran Khan.

== Early life ==
Masood Sharif Khan Khattak was born on 5 June 1950 in a Pashtun family of the Khattak tribe to Captain Muhammad Sharif Khan of the Pakistan Navy and Begum Jan both belonging to the same village in Karak District village Billand Kala. Masood grew up in a typical armed forces household with strict discipline, complete with a dinner bell at the dining table. Masood is the eldest of three siblings, one sister and two brothers. Travelling and reading for education were the order of the day at the Sharif household. Formal dining engagements involving the royalty and influential people of Pakistan, Britain and India were a regular feature at the Sharif residence in Karachi and Delhi.

== Education ==
Masood Sharif Khan Khattak was educated in Delhi Public School when his father, Captain Muhammad Sharif, was posted as Pakistan’s first naval attaché in Delhi, India. Later on after getting a Gold Medal from Sindh province, he completed his college at the prestigious Cadet College Petaro, where he was friends with the former President of Pakistan Asif Ali Zardari. He was also the youngest graduate of the Pakistan Military Academy. He completed his degree in War Studies at Command and Staff College, Quetta in 1978.

== Military and civil service ==
He retired from the army in 1986. He was also appointed the Director-General, Intelligence Bureau from 1993 to 1996. This is where he played a pivotal role in securing Pakistan's borders in Baluchistan and in securing peace in Karachi. He increased the size of the organisation to three times its original size and revamped its organizational structure and introduced STS Anti-Terrorism training for all officers of the organisation.

Masood Sharif Khan Khattak created and headed a co-operation committee, chaired by the Prime Minister and the Interior Minister. This committee consisted of the Directors General of the Military Intelligence (MI), the Inter Services Intelligence (ISI), Naval Intelligence (NI), Air Force Intelligence (AFI), the Inspector General of Police (IGP) and the Federal Investigation Agency (FIA).

He was arrested by the Farooq Leghari government in 1996 and imprisoned on charges of corruption as well as allegations which included widespread wiretapping of opposition politicians, judges and senators.

Released in 1999, he was investigated by the NAB on corruption charges but no cases of corruption were filed against him in any court.

== World Economic Forum on East Asia ==
Masood Sharif spoke at the 2009 World Economic Form on East Asia, held in Seoul, Korea. He spoke on the topic of Asian Flashpoints: Challenges to Security. Among other points, he said "that the divergent interests of leaders of countries and the populace is one reason three of the countries that have nuclear weapons – India, Pakistan and North Korea – also have millions of hungry mouths to feed."

== Publications and TV appearances ==
Masood Sharif wrote regularly in The News International newspaper of Pakistan. Masood Sharif Khan was also a regular on TV and radio shows across the world including the BBC, GEO TV, Voice of America and more.

== Personal life and death ==
Khattak died on 29 January 2023, at the age of 72 at his hometown of Karak.

Government offices
Preceded by Not Available	Director General of the Federal Investigation Agency (DG FIA); 1992–1993	Succeeded by Not Available
Preceded by Noor Leghari	Director General of the Intelligence Bureau (DG IB); 1993–1996	Succeeded by Not Available
Party political offices
Preceded by Not Available	Vice-President of the Pakistan Peoples Party; 1999–2008	Succeeded by Not Available
Preceded by Not Available	Vice-President of the Pakistan Peoples Party Parliamentarians; 1999–2008	Succeeded by Not Available
