= Animal Lover =

Studio album by the Residents
- Released: April 5, 2005
- Recorded: 2005
- Length: 58:46
- Label: Mute/EMI

The Residents chronology
Demons Dance Alone (2002)	Animal Lover (2005)	The River of Crime (2006)

Professional ratings
Review scores
Source	Rating
AllMusic	4/5 stars
PopMatters	(6/10)

Animal Lover is an album by American art rock band the Residents. Released in 2005, it is a concept album about the interaction between human beings, industry, and nature. Animal Lover was released to relative critical acclaim and remains a fan favorite.

== Track listing ==
No.	Title	Length
1.	"On the Way (to Oklahoma)"	4:06
2.	"Olive and Gray"	4:07
3.	"What Have My Chickens Done Now"	4:24
4.	"Two Lips"	2:43
5.	"Mr. Bee's Bumble"	3:28
6.	"Inner Space"	4:15
7.	"Dead Men"	3:25
8.	"My Window"	5:20
9.	"Ingrid's Oily Tongue"	1:55
10.	"Mother No More"	3:19
11.	"Dreaming of an Anthill (Teeming)"	2:23
12.	"Elmer's Song"	4:34
13.	"The Monkey Man"	4:01
14.	"The Whispering Boys"	4:27
15.	"Burn My Bones"	6:19
Total length:		58:46

== Bonus CD ==
The album also contains a bonus CD, generally called "...Imaginary Jack". According to the Cryptic Corporation, it really is one long track, divided to six parts to the enjoyment of the listener. The full title is actually the entire text written on the disc:

"I stood at my window staring at an arcing streetlight.
A sudden wind made me pull my shoulders to my ears.
I pissed into the dark.
It smelled like canned tuna.
My swollen lip throbbed.
I could still taste the blood.
My eyes rolled back looking for memories.
I stopped.

I was changing details in my mind, remembering only what I wanted it to be, not what it was.
I had only a short time to do what had to be done, after that it would all be forever absorbed by my imaginary Jack."

The tracks on the bonus CD combine elements from tracks from the original CD with elements from unreleased material, including early sketches and outtakes. For example, Track 2 samples earlier sketches of "My Window" and "Burn My Bones", Track 5 samples an instrumental later released as "Animal Lover Seven", and track 6 samples both "Jack's Lament" and a separately-recorded sketch for a vocal version.

=== Track listing ===
1. "Part 1" - 2:55
2. "Part 2" - 6:52
3. "Part 3" - 1:38
4. "Part 4" - 1:22
5. "Part 5" - 6:28
6. "Part 6" - 10:10

== Animal Lover Instrumental ==
A CD containing a series of lush instrumental organizations was released in January 2008. It was limited to 1000 copies and sold very quickly.

=== Track listing ===
1. "Low Rain" - 2:11
2. "Dead Men" - 3:28
3. "On the Way (to Oklahoma)" - 2:12
4. "Olive and Gray" - 2:30
5. "What Have My Chickens Done Now?" - 2:48
6. "Two Lips" - 3:33
7. "Jack's Lament" - 2:18
8. "Inner Space" - 3:08
9. "My Window" - 2:07
10. "Ingrid's Oily Tongue" - 3:25
11. "Mother No More" - 3:00
12. "Aura Flex" - 3:31
13. "Elmer's Song" - 6:00
14. "Monkey Man" - 5:01
15. "The Whispering Boy" - 3:09
16. "Burn My Bones" - 5:04

== Trivia ==
"My Window" is a common encore song, starting with the Residents' 'The Bunny Boy' tour.
