= Liver Music =

Live album by The Residents
- Released: 1990
- Recorded: 1972–1990
- Genre: Experimental rock
- Label: UWEB

Liver Music is a collection of songs by the Residents put together by their now-defunct fan club UWEB. The tracks are an assortment of mostly live songs from 1972 to 1990.

== Track listing ==
1. Diskomo
2. Numb Erone/Satisfaction/Kick a Cat
3. This Is a Man's World
4. Excerpt from "The Snakey Wake"
5. Red Rider/Die in Terror
6. The History of Digital Music (Music Box Punched Card System)
7. Lizard Lady/Semolina
8. Excerpt from "The Party - '72"
9. Ober
10. The History of Digital Music II (The Macintosh Computer - Pre-MIDI)
11. Happy Home/Star Spangled Banner
12. Santa Dog (Live - Cube N.Y.E.)

== Notes from release ==
Information pertains to the tracks in order

1. From the "13th Anniversary Show", San Francisco, CA February, 1987. Released as a flexi-disc inserted into the April 1988 issue of Reflex Magazine,
2. From "Oh Mummy! Oh Daddy! Can't You See That It's True, What The Beatles Did To Me I Love Lucy Did To You" Berkeley, CA June 1976. None of this infamous show has ever been released. Chaos in motion,
3. From the "13th Anniversary Show" Sydney, Australia, August 1986. Became a single in Australia, but otherwise unreleased,
4. From the "Snakey Wake" San Francisco, CA September 1987. An interesting comparison with the studio version (UWEB 002). Previously unreleased,
5. From the "13th Anniversary Show", San Francisco, CA October 1985. Recorded at a rehearsal. Previously unreleased,
6. (Music Box Punch Card System) Berkeley, CA September 1985. Done under a pseudonym, this demonstration was for a junior highschool music class. Previously unreleased,
7. From the "13th Anniversary Show", Tokyo, Japan October 1985. Left off "The Eyeball Show" album. Previously unreleased,
8. From "The Party", San Francisco, CA Spring 1972. A performance done under another pseudonym for a private party. Previously unreleased,
9. From "Cube-E", San Francisco, CA September 1989. The opening to the third part of "Cube-E". Previously unreleased,
10. (The Macintosh Computer pre-midi) Berkeley, CA September 1985. Done under a pseudonym, this demonstration was for a junior highschool music class. Previously unreleased,
11. From "Uncle Sam Mole Show", Washington D.C. November 1983. A special additional ending to "The Mole Show" for this New Music America event,
12. From "Cube N.Y.E.", San Francisco, CA January 1990. A New Year's treat performed at midnight, luckily recorded by J. Raoul Brody and The Stupeds.
