= Vileness Fats =

- Directed by: The Residents; Graeme Whifler
- Written by: The Residents
- Starring: The Residents; J. Raoul Brody; N. Senada; Marge Howard; Sally Lewis; Margaret Smyk
- Music by: The Residents
- Release dates: 1984 (Whatever Happened to Vileness Fats?); 2001 (Icky Flix)
- Running time: Whatever Happened To Vileness Fats?: 30 minutes, Icky Flix version: 17 minutes
- Language: English

Vileness Fats is an unfinished musical film project by avant-garde art collective The Residents, filmed primarily between 1972 and 1976. The Residents shot over fourteen hours of film and videotape for the project, but they cancelled the production less than two thirds of the way through shooting their incomplete script.

Sections of the film have been released on home video. The 30-minute Whatever Happened to Vileness Fats? featurette was released in 1984, and the Icky Flix DVD in 2001 included a remastered 17-minute "concentrate" excising numerous plot points. Additional clips and outtakes from the production were seen in the 2015 documentary Theory of Obscurity: A Film About The Residents.

== Plot ==
The village of Vileness Flats is constantly under attack by the Atomic Shopping Carts, armored carts with large drills. A bridge keeps the Carts away, but the villagers enlist the Siamese twin tag-team wrestlers, Arf and Omega, to protect them. Arf and Omega summon the immortal Indian priestess Weescoosa for assistance, who strafes the village from the sky in a fighter plane - unable to tell villager from villain as they are all so small. Arf and Omega fight off the invading Shopping Carts, and a banquet is held in their honor where the mayor thanks them. Steve, Vileness Flats' resident religious leader, gives a lengthy, boring speech. The twins heckle and throw their food at Steve, and he walks away, dejected.

Steve has his own problems. No one but his mother knows that he is actually two people – Steve, the religious leader of Vileness Flats, and Lonesome Jack, the leader of the Bell Boys and the mastermind of the meat raids. To complicate matters further, both Steve and Jack are deeply in love with Weescoosa, who has spent eternity searching for her one true love. Sadly, whenever it looks like she has found him, he dies.

The defeat of the Atomic Shopping Carts leads to another problem for Vileness Flats – the Bell Boys, a gang of midgets who live in the desert on the other side of the bridge. They disguise themselves as meat in order to cross the now-safe bridge, to steal the real meat from the village. These raids are depriving the villagers of necessary protein. The raids are causing unrest in the village and fights are breaking out, due to lack of food. The villagers ask Arf and Omega to deal with the Bell Boys, and they agree. Before they do anything, however, they head off to a local nightclub, Uncle Willy's, to relax.

The first act is The Mysterious N. Senada, performing the songs "Kamikaze Lady" and "Eloise", and the second is a performance of the Randy Newman song "Lonely At The Top" by the seductive singer Peggy Honeydew. Honeydew flirts with both twins, causing them to become jealous of each other. Honeydew is part of a plan to dispatch the twins so that Lonesome Jack and the Bell Boys will be safe to attack the village.

Steve, confused and worried about the whole mess, decides to jump into a local volcano to kill himself and thus get rid of the problems facing Vileness Flats, but his two selves end up facing off on the volcano top as most of the town of Vileness Fats, and Weescoosa, look on. At the nightclub, Arf and Omega become so enraged with each other that they become engaged in a knife fight. A closing benediction is offered by Uncle Willy, as the victorious brother drags his dead twin from the club.

== History ==
The Residents had just moved into a studio at 20 Sycamore Street, San Francisco, which featured a completely open ground floor, perfect, it seemed, for a sound stage. The group felt that a film would be the perfect medium for the ideas they had been coming up with, and jumped at the idea. The studio was roomy, but not quite big enough to produce a film. In order to be able to fit sets into the ground floor space, the group made most of the characters in the film midgets (not real midgets – the costumes were designed so that full-height people could crouch down in them and waddle around).

The sets were very elaborate, in a sort of German Expressionist style reminiscent of The Cabinet Of Dr. Caligari. They were made of cardboard and the space limitations meant that each set had to be completely dismantled before the next one could be built. This affected the filming schedule and sometimes even the developing plot. The Residents hired people as they found a need, grabbing Graeme Whifler to do lighting and some directing, and J. Raoul Brody to act.

Without a film company in control of the project, the Residents were completely free in their artistic expression, something they felt was very important. They financed it all themselves (one of them selling his sports car for $1200) and could only work on it during evenings and weekends due to the jobs they were holding down in order to pay for it all. They used 1/2" black and white video tape in the filming, for a variety of reasons. They felt that video was the coming medium, and wanted to be on the leading edge of the technology. Also, with video tape they could see the results of their work immediately after filming, which was useful as it let them get right on with re-shooting when necessary. And most importantly, they didn't have to pay for developing.

Unfortunately, the lack of direction on the project meant that it dragged on for many years. By 1976 the band had fourteen hours of film and were not even two-thirds of the way through what they had of the incomplete script. To make things worse, 1/2" black and white video tape had become obsolete due to the introduction of the Beta and VHS colour formats, so the footage looked dated even though it was brand new. There was no way that the video could be transferred to film and re-shooting the footage was out of the question. The space limitations were becoming too restrictive, as well – it took a full year to build the set for and film the nightclub scene. Finally, shortly after the band released The Third Reich 'n' Roll, they abandoned the project. Not ones to let even failed projects go to waste, they proceeded to tease the outside world with stills from the film, incorporating the mysterious film that never was into their mythology.

Vileness Fats dominated the Residents' lives for the four years that it was in production. Even when they were taking breaks from the film and working on other projects, Fats would creep in. The "Arf & Omega, featuring The Singing Lawnchairs" track from Santa Dog is taken directly from the film's soundtrack; Margaret Smik joined the Residents as Peggy Honeydew for the "Oh Mummy! Oh Daddy! Can't You See That It's True; What the Beatles Did to Me, 'I Love Lucy' Did to You" performance in 1976; and the famous Third Reich 'n' Roll promotional video was filmed, for the most part, on the Vileness Fats sets using Vileness Fats props.

== Releases ==
=== Whatever Happened To Vileness Fats? (1984) ===
In 1984, the Residents discovered that the state of video technology had advanced to the point where they could salvage their old 1/2" Vileness Fats work and transfer it to VHS. They created a half-hour video from their original fourteen hours of footage and created an all-new soundtrack, releasing the result as Whatever Happened to Vileness Fats?

The new video focused on Arf and Omega's story, from the Atomic Shopping Cart battle to the knife fight at the nightclub. It also spends a lot of time on Steve's mother, but touches only briefly on the Bell Boys, Lonesome Jack, and Weescoosa. Whatever Happened to Vileness Fats? has very little dialogue and is not very concerned with conveying a coherent story.

=== Icky Flix (2001) ===
In 2001, The Residents released their retrospective Icky Flix project on DVD and CD, the DVD featuring their classic music videos with the option of a brand new soundtrack. Also featured was a newly edited 17-minute "concentrate" of Vileness Fats, also with a new soundtrack.

This version focuses mainly on Steve, touches only briefly on the Atomic Shopping Cart battle, and features the Bell Boys and Lonesome Jack more prominently. This is considered the best place to see the Vileness Fats footage, as it has been cleaned up and restored to its best quality, taking into consideration the age of the tapes.

=== Chart ===
The Residents' website features a hidden page on Vileness Fats, which features a full plot outline with 35 numbered scenes. Many of these scenes have been released or have had excerpts released as bonus features for the Theory of Obscurity documentary. The following is a chart of which scenes are available where.

Scene Number	'84 VHS	2001 DVD	ToO bonus	Free! Weird
One	check			
Two			check	
Three (Not shot)				
Four	check	check		
Five	check			
Six	check	check		
Seven				
Eight	check			
Nine				
Ten			check	
Eleven (Not shot)				
Twelve (Not shot)				
Thirteen (Not shot)				
Fourteen				
Fifteen	check			
Sixteen (Not shot)				
Seventeen	check	check		
Eighteen	check	check		
Nineteen				
Twenty (Not shot)				
Twenty-One	check			
Twenty-Two (Not shot)				
Twenty-Three	check	check		check
Twenty-Four				
Twenty-Five	check			check
Twenty-Six				
Twenty-Seven	check	check		
Twenty-Eight	check	check		
Twenty-Nine	check			
Thirty	check	check		
Thirty-One				
Thirty-Two	check	check		
Thirty-Three	check	check		
Thirty-Four	check	check		
Thirty-Five			check	
