= Gingerbread Man (album) =

Studio album by the Residents
- Released: 1995
- Genres: Experimental; rock
- Length: 36:38
- Label: East Side Digital

The Residents chronology
Our Finest Flowers (1992)	Gingerbread Man (1995)	Hunters (1995)

Professional ratings
Review scores
Source	Rating
AllMusic	3/5 stars
Entertainment Weekly	B+

Gingerbread Man is a 1995 album and interactive music CD-ROM by American art rock group the Residents, released in 1995. It was their first foray into computer graphics. Original versions of the CD were "enhanced" with animations that followed the music when played on a computer. The animations served as a basis for the costumes of the characters when a number of the songs were performed in the 25th anniversary shows in 1997. Later the same year regular CDs, with just the music, were released. The inside cover of the album special edition was held together with a branded label of Velcro.

== Track listing ==
No.	Title	Length
1.	"The Weaver"	3:52
2.	"The Dying Oilman"	3:14
3.	"The Confused Transsexual"	3:13
4.	"The Sold-Out Artist"	3:47
5.	"The Ascetic"	4:08
6.	"The Old Soldier"	3:32
7.	"The Aging Musician"	4:52
8.	"The Butcher"	3:05
9.	"The Old Woman"	4:32
10.	"Ginger's Lament"	2:23
Total length:		36:38
