= Graeme Whifler =

American screenwriter and film director (born 1951)

Graeme Whifler (born May 10, 1951 in San Mateo, California) is an American screenwriter and film director.

Whifler has written and directed numerous movies, television documentaries, videos, and music videos. He directed films like Neighborhood Watch, and TV shows like Secrets & Mysteries, along with co-directing the unfinished film Vileness Fats with The Residents. He also wrote the screenplay for the horror film Dr. Giggles and the cult film Sonny Boy.

Whifler directed music videos from the late 1970s to the mid-1980s.

Whifler currently resides in the Chevy Chase area of Glendale and is co-President of the Chevy Chase Estates Association.
