= The Mole Show Live in Holland =

Live album by The Residents
- Released: 1989
- Recorded: Muziekcentrum Vredenburg in Utrecht on June 4, 1983
- Genre: Avant-Garde
- Length: 63:52
- Label: Torso / East Side Digital
- Producer: The Cryptic Corporation

The Mole Show Live in Holland is a live album by the band The Residents, released in 1989. This is the most easily accessible version of the Mole Show and it was presented live, complete with narration by Penn Jillette. There are others (a picture disc release of a show at The Roxy, for instance) but, for sound quality and a good idea of how the presentation went, look no further. Excerpts from this show were also videotaped and released on video in 1984 along with Whatever Happened to Vileness Fats?. It was rated three stars by AllMusic.

== Track listing (CD) ==
1. "Voices of the Air"
2. "The Secret Seed"
3. "Narration"
4. "The Ultimate Disaster"
5. "Narration"
6. "God of Darkness"
7. "Narration"
8. "Migration"
9. "Narration"
10. "Smack Your Lips"
11. "Narration"
12. "Another Land"
13. "Narration"
14. "The New Machine"
15. "Narration"
16. "Call of the Wild"
17. "Final Confrontation"
18. "Narration"
19. "Satisfaction"
20. "Happy Home"
