= Metal, Meat & Bone: The Songs of Dyin' Dog =

Studio album by The Residents
- Released: July 10, 2020
- Genres: Blues; industrial; electronic
- Length: 78:25
- Label: Cherry Red
- Producers: The Residents, Eric Drew Feldman

The Residents chronology
Intruders (2018)	Metal, Meat & Bone: The Songs of Dyin' Dog (2020)	Doctor Dark (2025)

Metal, Meat & Bone: The Songs of Dyin' Dog is the 46th album released by American art rock band the Residents in July 2020. It is a rock opera which purports to be an album of covers of songs by fictional albino blues singer Alvin Snow, also known as Dyin' Dog. The album's musical style encompasses blues, electronic and industrial music.

== Music and lyrics ==
Metal, Meat & Bone is a rock opera, based around the music of a fictional blues singer named Alvin Snow, also known as Dyin' Dog. According to the fictional biography created by the Residents, Snow was born an albino on January 13, 1939, to an interracial couple who subsequently left the baby Snow on the doorstep of an orphanage with a note that read "I Calls Him Alvin". Snow subsequently struggled with his identity, and began to grift, before becoming influenced by Howlin' Wolf to sing blues songs, and formed a band which he called the Mongrels, inspired by his experience with the death of a crippled pet dog, and recorded a series of demos with the band before disappearing in 1976.

Selections from Metal, Meat & Bone were first previewed on the Residents' In Between Dreams tour in 2018. The album's concept was first introduced by the July 2019 upload of a track from the album, "Bury My Bone", supposedly recorded by a singer named Dyin' Dog. A couple of months later, in October 2019, the Residents uploaded a 13-minute mini-documentary on YouTube detailing Snow's supposed history. A box set of five 7" singles purported to contain all of Snow's recorded output was released at the same time. These recordings appear as disc two of the album, while disc one contains "covers" of the ten Snow songs, and six additional songs credited as being written by the Residents, which were "inspired by" Snow.

The album's musical style encompasses blues, industrial, electronic, alternative rock, electronica, industrial dance and rhythm and blues.

== Release and reception ==
Professional ratings
Review scores
Source	Rating
Under the Radar	7/10 stars
Classic Rock	3/5 stars

The Residents currently plan to tour the album in August 2021 on the Dog Stab! tour, playing songs from it alongside various selections from the 1978 album Duck Stab / Buster & Glen.

The track "DIE! DIE! DIE!" was promoted with a single and music video on May 15, 2020. The video gained small notoriety for its references to Donald Trump and the COVID-19 pandemic, as well as the participation of Black Francis, singer and frontman of the Pixies, on the song's vocals.

A second music video for "Bury My Bone", directed by media artist John Sanborn, was released on June 28, 2020.

== Track listing ==
Tracks 1–10 on disc one are credited to Alvin Snow. Tracks 11–16 are credited to the Residents.

Disc one: The Residents Pay Tribute to Dyin' Dog
No.	Title	Length
1.	"Bury My Bone"	2:12
2.	"Hungry Hound"	2:03
3.	"Die! Die! Die!" (featuring Black Francis)	4:05
4.	"River Runs Dry"	2:50
5.	"The Dog's Dream"	2:51
6.	"I Know"	3:56
7.	"Pass for White"	3:13
8.	"Tell Me"	2:59
9.	"Mama Don't Go"	2:22
10.	"Dead Weight"	3:14
11.	"Cold as a Corpse"	2:40
12.	"Blood Stains"	2:45
13.	"Cut to the Quick"	2:21
14.	"She Called Me Doggy"	3:03
15.	"Evil Hides"	3:12
16.	"Midnight Man"	5:40
Total length:		49:26

Disc two: The Original Dyin' Dog Demos
No.	Title	Length
1.	"Bury My Bone"	2:15
2.	"Hungry Hound"	2:08
3.	"Die! Die! Die!"	4:03
4.	"River Runs Dry"	2:12
5.	"The Dog's Dream"	3:09
6.	"I Know"	3:25
7.	"Pass for White"	3:50
8.	"Tell Me"	2:39
9.	"Mama Don't Go"	2:02
10.	"Dead Weight"	3:16
Total length:		28:59

== Personnel ==
=== Disc one ===
- The Residents – performance, arrangements
- Eric Drew Feldman – production, performance
- Nolan Cook – guitars
- Carla Fabrizio – vocals
- Sivan Lioncub – vocals
- Peter Whitehead – vocals
- Rob Laufer – vocals
- Black Francis – vocals on "DIE! DIE! DIE!"

=== Disc two ===
- Alvin Snow – performance, songwriting
- The Mongrels – performance
- Roland Sheehan – performance
