= Cube E: Live in Holland =

Live album by The Residents
- Released: November 8, 1994
- Genre: Avant-garde
- Label: Restless

Cube E: Live in Holland is an album by the Residents released on November 8, 1994, by Restless Records as an audio CD.

Although not videotaped in its entirety, the project called The History of American Music in 3 E-Z Pieces was recorded almost in entirety and released as Cube-E: Live in Holland. The project featured the progression from cowboy songs and slave songs to their ultimate melding into rock and roll. The first two parts, Buckaroo Blues and Black Barry, had previously been released together on a cassette for UWEB fan club members, while most of the Elvis tracks had appeared on the previous year's The King and Eye. For space reasons, much of the narration of the last piece is missing.

== CD Track listing ==
1. From the Plains to Mexico
2. The Theme from Buckaroo Blues
3. The Stampede
4. The Trail Dance
5. Bury Me Not
6. Cowboy Waltz
7. Saddle Sores
8. The Theme from Buckaroo Blues (Reprise)
9. The Gospel Truth
10. Shortnin' Bread
11. Black Barry
12. Forty-Four
13. Engine 44
14. New Orleans
15. Voodoo Queen
16. What Am I Gonna Do
17. Organism
18. Ober
19. The Baby King 1
20. Don't Be Cruel
21. Devil in Disguise
22. Burning Love
23. Teddy Bear
24. Love Me Tender
25. The Baby King 11
26. Hound Dog/Out

== Legacy ==
The music of Cube-E has gone on to influence numerous acts, notably american soundtrack composer Ego Plum, who cites seeing the show as an important moment in his life.
