= Tweedles =

2006 concept album by The Residents

Studio album by the Residents
- Released: October 31, 2006
- Recorded: 2005–2006
- Length: 61:09
- Labels: Mute; EMI

The Residents chronology
River of Crime (2006)	Tweedles (2006)	The Voice of Midnight (2007)

Professional ratings
Review scores
Source	Rating
AllMusic	4/5 stars

Tweedles is a concept album by American art rock band the Residents. It was released on October 31, 2006. The CD is accompanied by a two-part book: the first half contains the album's spoken lines, and the second half contains the lyrics to the songs.

It was recorded in 2006 when the Residents were invited by a friend in Romania to try out his new recording studios. As The Residents' own studio was undergoing maintenance to make it earthquake-resistant and could not be used for a year, they took the opportunity to record a new album.

== Concept ==
Tweedles tells the story of an "emotional vampire" from a first person perspective. He draws power from his well-developed ability to manipulate both men and women into seeing him as their perfect lover. At this point, he uses that affection to secure sexual favors before moving on to his next victim, leaving confusion and pain in his wake while feeling nothing. The character is shown contemplating his internal conflicts, lack of empathy, and romantic idealism, which he deems "disgusting". Toward the end of the album, it is revealed that Tweedles is the name of a clown alter-ego the narrator would have created if he had succeeded in becoming an entertainer.

== Track listing ==
No.	Title	Length
1.	"Dreams"	3:54
2.	"Almost Perfect"	4:05
3.	"Mark of the Male"	2:14
4.	"Life"	3:37
5.	"Isolation"	4:21
6.	"Stop Signs"	6:05
7.	"Elevation"	4:55
8.	"Forgiveness"	1:28
9.	"Insincere"	2:07
10.	"The Perfect Lover"	3:32
11.	"Brown Cow"	5:18
12.	"Sometimes"	3:06
13.	"Ugly (At the End)"	3:19
14.	"Keep Talkin'"	3:41
15.	"Shame on Me"	6:50
16.	"Susie Smiles"	2:37
Total length:		61:09

== Tabasco ==
Tabasco

Demo album by The Residents
- Released: January 1st 2010
- Recorded: 2005 - 2006
- Genres: Ambient, Instrumental
- Length: 55:13
- Label: Ralph Sells Downloads
- Producer: The Cryptic Corporation

The Residents chronology
The Fillmore Dress Rehearsal (2010)	Tabasco (2010)	RMX (2010)

On January 1, 2010, The Residents released 'Tabasco', a collection of 3 instrumental demo tracks which would ultimately evolve into Tweedles. The album was sold through their digital download store, 'Ralph Sells Downloads'. On May 15, 2015, following the shut down of RSD, the album was re-released through the Ralphlet Outlet bandcamp page for a limited time. The second version features new artwork.

All three tracks are named after the classical elements. 'Air' features early versions of 'Dreams', 'Life', 'Isolation' & 'Mark Of The Male'. 'Earth' features 'Stop Signs', 'Almost Perfect', 'Elevation', & 'Keep Talking'. 'Water' features 'Brown Cow' 'Dreams' 'Shame On Me' 'Ugly' & 'Susie Smiles'.

=== Track listing ===
No.	Title	Length
1.	"Air"	19:34
2.	"Earth"	21:27
3.	"Water"	14:12
Total length:		55:13

== Credits ==
- Composed & Performed By The Residents
- With Guests: Carla Fabrizio, Nolan Cook, Gerri Lawlor & The Film Orchestra of Bucharest
- Recorded By: The Artists & Kevin Ink, 2006
- Published By: Pale Pachyderm Publishing, BMI / Warner Chappell, BMI
- Project Manager for Mute: Robert Schilling
- Thanks To: Olivier Cormier Otano
- Produced By: The Cryptic Corporation
