= Not Available =

Studio album by the Residents
- Released: 1978
- Recorded: 1974
- Genres: Rock opera, experimental music
- Length: 35:23 (original LP); 42:26 (2011 reissue)
- Label: Ralph

The Residents chronology
Fingerprince (1977)	Not Available (1978)	Duck Stab/Buster & Glen (1978)

Not Available is the fourth studio album by the American experimental rock band the Residents, released in 1978. The album was allegedly meant to only be released once its creators completely forgot about its existence (adhering to their "Theory of Obscurity", the belief that an artist's purest work is created without an audience); however, due to ongoing delays in the release of Eskimo, Not Available was released to supply the demand for new Residents material, given their unexpected critical and commercial success following the release of the Duck Stab EP.

== History ==
It is said that the lyrics and themes of Not Available arose from personal tensions within the group, and that the project began as a private psychodrama before being adapted into a possible operetta. While the project never took off theatrically, it was still molded into a sort of concept album, taking use of assorted musical ideas, some of them recorded for the group's unfinished film project, Vileness Fats. It is unknown if further overdubs were added onto the album predating its release in 1978, though the pREServed single “Not Available (Work In Progress)” would indicate that additional overdubs and edits were made.

It is possible that the album was shelved not to fulfill the "Theory of Obscurity," but because it was simply too personally revealing.

== Music ==
The music on Not Available is fairly different from any other music the Residents recorded in the time period it was supposedly conceived in, both in compositional skill and audio quality. Fans have theorized that the music could have been recorded at a later period.

The album is split into four parts and an epilogue, with the Residents' characteristic use of drum machines, classical percussion, cartoonish vocals, grand piano and horns, as well as notably the use of string synthesizers. The lyrics and plot of Not Available are told in a densely surrealistic manner, notably making use of a Greek chorus and a particular piano composition that is presented as a theme for one of the album's characters – the full recording was released in 2010 as "Available Piece."

A 2011 reissue of the album extended its duration by approximately seven minutes, allegedly its original length. A mix of the album's multitrack tapes (originally titled X is for Xtra) was released in 2019 on a deluxe edition of the album.

== Critical reception ==
Professional ratings
Review scores
Source	Rating
AllMusic	3.5/5 stars
The Encyclopedia of Popular Music	3/5 stars
The Great Rock Discography	6/10
MusicHound Rock	4/5 stars
The Rolling Stone Album Guide	3.5/5 stars
Spin Alternative Record Guide	6/10

The Spin Alternative Record Guide labeled the album "free-form avant-gardism."

== Track listing ==
All tracks are written by the Residents.

Side one
No.	Title	Length
1.	"Part One: Edweena"	9:29
2.	"Part Two: The Making of a Soul"	9:59
Total length:		19:28

Side two
No.	Title	Length
1.	"Part Three: Ship's a'Going Down"	6:34
2.	"Part Four: Never Known Questions"	7:00
3.	"Epilogue"	2:21
Total length:		15:55

=== 1987 CD bonus tracks ===
Tracks 6–11 taken from Title in Limbo, a 1983 album made in collaboration with Renaldo and the Loaf.

No.	Title	Length
6.	"Intro: Version"	1:23
7.	"The Shoe Salesman"	4:10
8.	"Crashing"	1:41
9.	"Monkey and Bunny"	5:00
10.	"Mahogany Wood"	4:14
11.	"The Sailor Song"	6:05
Total length:		57:54

=== 2011 extended edition ===
No.	Title	Length
1.	"Part One: Edweena"	10:55
2.	"Part Two: The Making of a Soul"	10:03
3.	"Part Three: Ship's a'Going Down"	10:10
4.	"Part Four: Never Known Questions"	8:54
5.	"Epilogue"	2:21
Total length:		42:26

=== 2018 pREServed edition ===
Disc one
No.	Title	Length
1.	"Part One: Edweena"	9:27
2.	"Part Two: The Making of a Soul"	9:52
3.	"Part Three: Ship's a'Going Down"	6:33
4.	"Part Four: Never Known Questions"	6:59
5.	"Epilogue"	2:35
6.	"Ship's a'Going Down" (1982 rehearsal)	2:36
7.	"Ship's a'Going Down" (live 1986)	4:14
8.	"Mourning Glories" (live 2014)	3:58
Total length:		46:14

Disc two – X Is for Xtra (A Conclusion)
No.	Title	Length
1.	"Mehico Ron Devoo"	3:04
2.	"Theme from X (with Roman Overtones)"	2:29
3.	"Theme from X (pt. 2)"	1:44
4.	"Solome and Goiter"	1:47
5.	"New Mexico Dream"	5:09
6.	"Ho Ho Bumped His Toe"	0:49
7.	"Where to Begin?"	4:22
8.	"Fairly Well"	4:09
9.	"Love Sprong"	2:47
10.	"Ah Spare Us, Gus"	2:09
11.	"Slow Texture"	2:17
12.	"Tennessee Williams"	2:06
13.	"Little A (An Authentic Folk Song)"	2:19
14.	"Asonarose"	2:30
15.	"Anaconda Montana"	2:53
16.	"Tune of the Unknown"	1:31
17.	"Soundtrack Music Piece 17"	1:54
18.	"O Solo Meow"	3:35
19.	"Mehico Ron Devoo Finale"	2:31
Total length:		64:51

After 10 minutes of silence following track 19, an unlisted track (Rest Aria) plays lasting 4:46.
