= Needcompany =

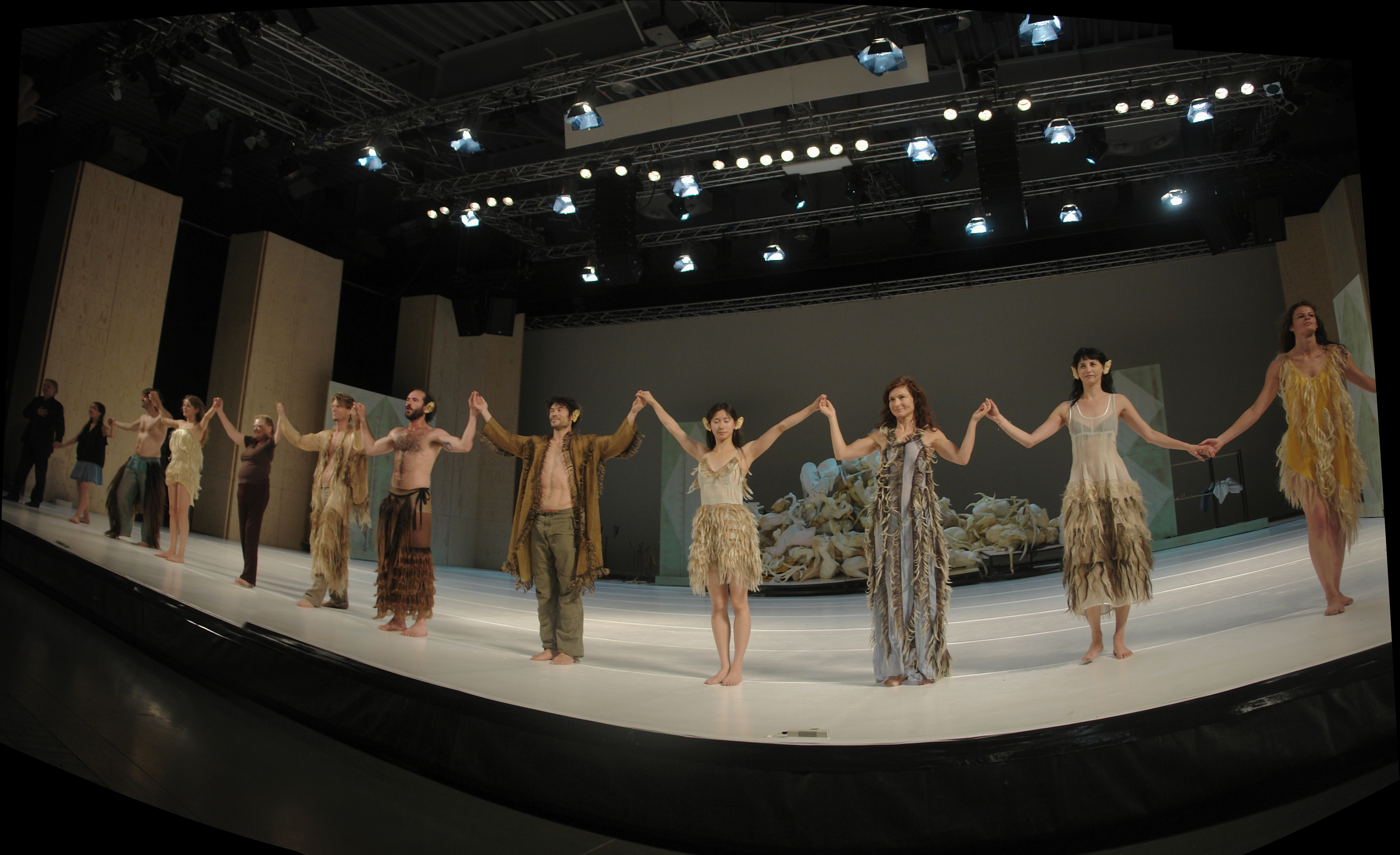
Needcompany after their performance in Poznań, 29 June 2010

Needcompany is an international performance group formed in 1986.

The two artists at the heart of Needcompany are Jan Lauwers and Grace Ellen Barkey. Lauwers is the company's founder and artistic director.

Their associated performing artists are MaisonDahlBonnema (Hans Petter Dahl & Anna Sophia Bonnema), Lemm&Barkey (Lot Lemm & Grace Ellen Barkey), OHNO COOPERATION (Maarten Seghers & Jan Lauwers) and the NC ensemble, which includes Viviane De Muynck. They create work of their own under Needcompany's wings.

Needcompany's work has been documented by John Freeman in 'The Greatest Shows on Earth: World Theatre from Peter Brook to the Sydney Olympics' and in an article for New Theatre Quarterly 'No Boundaries Here: Brecht, Lauwers, and European Theatre after Postmodernism' 29(03).

== Work by Jan Lauwers ==
- 1987 : Need to Know
- 1989 : ça va
- 1990 : Julius Caesar
- 1991 : Invictos
- 1992 : Antonius und Kleopatra
- 1992 : SCHADE/schade
- 1993 : Orfeo, opera by Walter Hus
- 1994 : The Snakesong Trilogy - Snakesong/Le Voyeur
- 1995 : The Snakesong Trilogy - Snakesong/Le Pouvoir (Leda)
- 1996 : Needcompany's Macbeth
- 1996 : The Snakesong Trilogy - Snakesong/Le Désir
- 1997 : Caligula, No beauty for me there, where human life is rare, part one
- 1998 : The Snakesong Trilogy, adapted version with live music
- 1999 : Morning Song, No beauty for me there, where human life is rare, part two
- 2000 : Needcompany's King Lear
- 2000 : DeaDDogsDon'tDance/ DjamesDjoyceDeaD
- 2001 : Ein Sturm
- 2002 : Images of Affection
- 2003 : No Comment
- 2004 : Isabella's Room
- 2006 : All is vanity
- 2006 : The Lobster Shop
- 2007 : The Porcelain Project
- 2008 : The Deer House
- 2008 : The Sad Face | Happy Face trilogy
- 2011 : The art of entertainment
- 2012 : Market Place 76

== Film work ==
=== Short films ===
- From Alexandria (1988)
- Mangia (1995)
- Sampled Images (2000)
- C-Song 01 (2003)
- C-Songs – The Lobster Shop (2006)

=== Film ===
- Goldfish Game (2002)
- I Want (No) Reality (2012) by Ana Brzezinska

== Other ==
- The Unauthorized Portrait by Nico Leunen

== Work by Grace Ellen Barkey ==
- 1992 : One
- 1993 : Don Quijote
- 1995 : Tres
- 1997 : Stories (histoires/verhalen)
- 1998 : Rood Red Rouge
- 1999 : The Miraculous Mandarin
- 2000 : Few Things
- 2002 : (AND)
- 2005 : Chunking
- 2007 : The Porcelain Project
- 2010: This door is too small (for a bear)
- 2013 : Mush-Room with music by The Residents
