= The Voice of Midnight =

Studio album by the Residents
- Released: 2007
- Recorded: 2007
- Length: 60:27
- Labels: Mute; EMI

The Residents chronology
Tweedles (2006)	The Voice of Midnight (2007)	The Bunny Boy (2008)

Professional ratings
Review scores
Source	Rating
AllMusic	3/5 stars

The Voice of Midnight is a concept album by American art rock band the Residents, released in 2007. It was adapted from a short story, "Der Sandmann", by Prussian writer E. T. A. Hoffmann.

The protagonist of the story is Nathaniel (Nate) who carries a deep-seated fear that the childhood fable character, The Sandman, is stalking him. Nate's fiancée, Claire is a steadfast realist.

The first 500 copies of the album came with a five-track bonus EP The Sandman Waits. The original plan was for it to be the first 300, but so many people pre-ordered the recording that they boosted the print run.

== Scenes ==
No.	Title	Length
1.	"Scene 1 (The Sandman)"	8:33
2.	"Scene 2 (Mental Decay)"	2:56
3.	"Scene 3 (Claire's Response)"	3:23
4.	"Scene 4 (In the Dark)"	3:12
5.	"Scene 5 (Professor Calligari)"	1:25
6.	"Scene 6 (The Telescope)"	5:53
7.	"Scene 7 (True Love)"	11:06
8.	"Scene 8 (Seven Cats)"	6:45
9.	"Scene 9 (Catatonia)"	2:52
10.	"Scene 10 (The Proposal)"	5:27
11.	"Scene 11 (The Tower)"	5:44
12.	"Scene 12 (Epilogue)"	3:11
Total length:		1:00:27

== Actors ==
Nate: Corey Rosen

- First worked with The Residents on River of Crime

Clair: Gerri Lawler

- Worked on River of Crime as well as Tweedles.

Olympia (the other "woman," originally a robot): Carla Fabrizo

- Long time Residents collaborator.

Other Characters: The Residents

== Score Performed By ==
The Residents
Nolan Cook
Carla Fabrizo
