= The Residents =

American avant-garde art and music collective

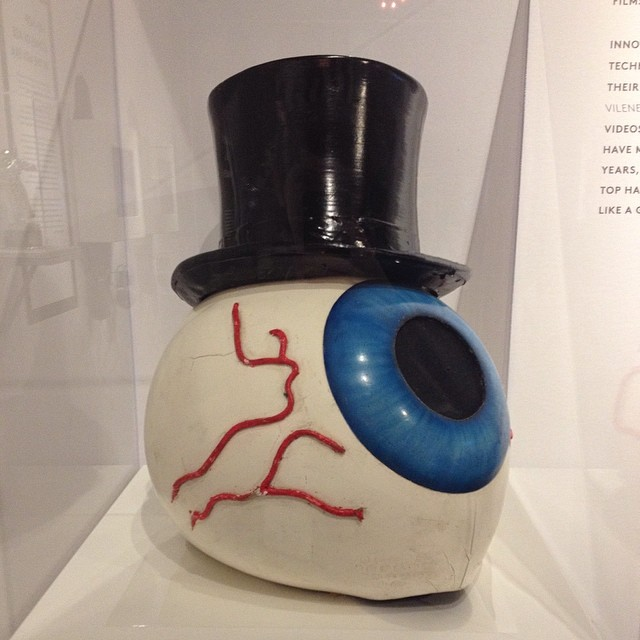
- An eyeball helmet worn by the Residents in concert

Background information
- Origin: Shreveport, Louisiana, U.S.
- Genres: Experimental rock; art pop; electronic
- Years active: 1969–1971 (unnamed); 1971–1972 (Residents, Uninc.); 1973–present (The Residents)
- Labels: Ralph; Rykodisc; Enigma; East Side Digital; Mute; MVD
- Past members: Hardy Fox
- Website: residents.com

The Residents are an American art collective, music and visual arts group best known for their avant-garde and multimedia works. Since their first official release, Santa Dog (1972) they have released over 60 albums, numerous music videos and short films, three CD-ROM projects, and ten DVDs over the course of over half a century. They have undertaken seven major world tours and scored multiple films. Pioneers in exploring the potential of CD-ROM and similar technologies, the Residents have won several awards for their multimedia projects. They founded Ralph Records, a record label focusing on avant-garde music, in 1972.

Throughout the group's existence, the individual members have ostensibly attempted to work anonymously, preferring to have attention focused on their art. Much speculation and rumor has focused on this aspect of the group. In public, they appear silent and costumed, often wearing eyeball helmets, top hats and tails—a costume now recognized as their signature iconography. In 2017, Hardy Fox, long known to be associated with the Residents, identified himself as the band's co-founder and primary composer; he died in 2018. The Residents have remained active and have been regarded as one of the longest running bands in popular music history.

== History ==
=== 1969–1972: Origins and Residents Unincorporated ===
The earliest known photograph of the group, circa 1969

In 1969, Texas born Hardy Fox moved from Louisiana to an apartment in San Mateo, California where he lived with his fellow Louisiana Tech University graduate and visual artist Homer Flynn, as well as two of the latter's high school friends, from Shreveport. Although the name would not be adopted until 1974, the earliest recordings credited to The Residents were made during this period.

While attempting to make a living, the group purchased crude recording equipment and began to refine their recording and editing skills, as well as photography, painting, and other affordable artistic endeavors. The Residents have acknowledged the existence of at least two unreleased reel-to-reel items from this era, titled The Ballad of Stuffed Trigger and Rusty Coathangers for the Doctor.

In 1971, the group, now accompanied by pianist James Whitaker and bassist Bob Tangney, sent a reel-to-reel demo tape, The Warner Bros. Album, to Hal Halverstadt at Warner Bros. Although the tape did not lead to a record deal, it did originate a name; as they had not included one on the return address, the rejection slip was addressed to "Residents", which led to them adopting the name Residents Uninc., and later, The Residents.

As Residents Uninc. the group began to make live appearances at open mic events, radio stations, and parties, most notably between October 18th and 31st, 1971, whilst they were working on a second demo tape for Warner, titled Baby Sex. The cover art for the tape box was a silk-screened copy of an old photo depicting a woman fellating a small child, an example of the extremely confrontational and deliberately puerile visual and lyrical style the group adopted during this period. These appearances and recordings were all accompanied by Philip 'Snakefinger' Lithman.

During this period the group also began to incorporate myth making and kayfabe into their work, when N. Senada became a prominent figure, appearing on stage, making radio appearances, even crediting him as the primary songwriter and performer on Baby Sex, merely accompanied by Residents Uninc.

=== 1972–1980: "Classic" era ===
==== Santa Dog, Meet the Residents, Not Available and The Third Reich 'n Roll (1972–1976) ====
The Enigmatic Foe (still from the Not Available sessions, 1974)

In 1972, Residents Uninc. relocated to 20 Sycamore St, San Francisco; a studio they named "El Ralpho", which boasted a completely open ground floor (seemingly ideal for a sound stage), allowing the group to expand their operations and also begin preliminary work on their most ambitious project up to that point, a full-length film entitled Vileness Fats, which consumed most of their attention for the next four years. Intended to be the first-ever long form music video, the Residents saw this project as an opportunity to create the ultimate cult film. After four years of filming (from 1972 to 1976) the project was reluctantly cancelled because of time, space, and monetary constraints. Fifteen hours of footage was shot for the project, yet only approximately 35 minutes of that footage has ever been released.

The group also formed Ralph Records at this time, as a small, independent label to release and promote their own work. In 1972, to inaugurate the new business, the group recorded and pressed the Santa Dog EP, their first recorded output to be released to the public. Designed to resemble a Christmas card from an insurance company, the EP consisted of two 7" singles, one song on each side. The four songs were presented as being by four different bands (Ivory & the Braineaters, Delta Nudes, the College Walkers, and Arf & Omega featuring the Singing Lawnchairs), with only a small note on the interior of the gatefold sleeve mentioning the participation of "Residents, Uninc."

They sent copies of Santa Dog to west coast radio stations with no response until Bill Reinhardt, program director of KBOO-FM in Portland, Oregon, received a copy and played it heavily on his show. Reinhardt met the Residents at their studio at 20 Sycamore St. in the summer of 1973 with the news of his broadcasts. The Residents gave Reinhardt exclusive access to all their recordings, including copies of the original masters of Stuffed Trigger, Baby Sex, and The Warner Bros. Album.

Throughout this point, the group had been manipulating old tapes they had collected and regularly recording jam sessions, and these recordings eventually became the group's debut full-length album, Meet the Residents, which was released in 1974 on Ralph. To aid in promoting the group, Reinhardt was given 50 of the first 1,000 copies of Meet the Residents. Some were sent to friends, listeners and critics, and two dozen were left for sale on consignment at the Music Millennium record store, where they sat unsold for months. KBOO DJ Barry Schwam (a.k.a. Schwump, who also recorded with the Residents) promoted them on his program as well. Eventually, KBOO airplay attracted a cult following.

The Third Reich 'N Roll promotional photo, 1976

Following the release of Meet the Residents, the group began working on a follow-up entitled Not Available. Following N. Senada's theory of obscurity, the LP was recorded and compiled completely in private, and would not be released until the group had completely forgotten about its existence.

During breaks in the sessions for Vileness Fats, the group recorded their next project, entitled The Third Reich 'n Roll, over the course of a year between October 1974 and October 1975. The album consisted of two side-long medleys of the band covering popular songs from 1950s and 1960s, whilst toying with the concept of the popularity of rock 'n' roll being comparable to that of the rise of Nazism in the 1930s. The resulting LP was released in 1976, and was the group's first project to feature a music video, created by syncing an old video of the group performing with an edited version of "Swastikas on Parade".

After the Third Reich 'n Roll's release, a group of enterprising friends and collaborators from their early days in San Mateo—Homer Flynn, Hardy Fox, Jay Clem and John Kennedy—also joined the group in San Francisco, forming what became the Cryptic Corporation to manage and represent the band. Clem became the band's spokesman; Fox edited, produced and compiled the band's increasingly prolific output; Flynn was already handling the group's cover design and promotional art under the banner of Pore Know Graphics; and Kennedy took the role of "President" (admittedly a fairly empty title, as overall responsibilities were handled more or less equally by the four). The Cryptic Corporation took over the day-to-day operations of Ralph Records, and provided the band with an improved public relations platform.

Shortly after the introduction of the Cryptic Corporation, the Residents recorded their "Satisfaction" single, the B-side of which featured the Residents' first work with the ARP Odyssey, the first synthesizer owned by the group, purchased by the Cryptics.

==== Eskimo, Fingerprince, Duck Stab, and rise in popularity (1976–1979) ====
Following "Satisfaction", the group began recording Eskimo in April 1976; a concept album based upon the Theory of Phonetic Organisation that suggests that music should not be confined to chords and structures, but instead should simply be a collection of fascinating noises. The album featured acoustic soundscapes inspired by Inuit culture, whilst parodying American ignorance of other cultures. The Eskimo sessions lasted many years, and featured many divergences, the first of which, in November 1976, resulted in Fingerprince, a collection of unused recordings from the Third Reich 'n Roll, Not Available, and Eskimo sessions.

Fingerprince received considerable coverage in the British press, and was the first LP by the group to receive any critical attention when Jon Savage reviewed the album and its two predecessors favorably for the December 31 issue of Sounds magazine. This review gained the group considerable attention, with many of their previously unsold mail-order items being sold seemingly overnight. The sudden success of Fingerprince and its predecessors caused the group to briefly halt production on Eskimo to create something more appealing to their newfound audience.

The Residents followed up Fingerprince with their Duck Stab! EP – their most accessible release up to that point. This EP got the band some attention from the press (namely NME, Sounds and Melody Maker), and was followed in 1978 by the Duck Stab/Buster & Glen album, which paired the EP with a similar, concurrently recorded EP which had not been released separately. The group then continued work on Eskimo, which proved a very difficult project, marked by many conflicts between the band and their management which led to a number of delays in the release date.

The sudden attention afforded to them by the success of the Duck Stab! EP and "Satisfaction" single required an album release as soon as possible to help fund the band's spiraling recording costs, and to meet the demand for new Residents material. This forced the release of the band's long-shelved "second album" Not Available in 1978. The Residents were not bothered by this deviation from the original plan not to release the album, as the 1978 release ultimately did not affect the philosophical conditions under which it was originally recorded.

Eskimo was finally released in 1979 to much acclaim, even making it to the final list for nominations for a Grammy award in 1980, although the album was not nominated. Rather than being songs in the orthodox sense, the compositions on Eskimo sounded like "live-action stories" without dialogue. The cover art of Eskimo also presents the first instance of the group wearing eyeball masks and tuxedos, which was later considered by many to be the group's signature costume. The Residents had only intended to wear these costumes for the cover of Eskimo, but adopted the costumes in the longer term as it provided them with a unique and recognisable image.

The group followed Eskimo with Commercial Album in 1980. The LP featured 40 songs, each exactly one minute in length. Around this time, two short films were made in collaboration with Graeme Whifler: One Minute Movies, consisting of four music videos for tracks from the Commercial Album; and a video for "Hello Skinny" from the Duck Stab LP. Created at a time when MTV (and what later became known as "music video" in general) was in its infancy, the group's videos were in heavy rotation since they were among the few music videos available to broadcasters.

=== 1981–1990: New technology and live performances ===
==== Mark of the Mole and The Mole Show (1981–1983) ====
The 'Chub Scientist' costume worn during performances of "The New Machine", throughout the Residents' 1982-1983 Mole Show tour.

The Residents' follow up to Commercial Album was Mark of the Mole, released in 1981. The album was a reaction to the group feeling betrayed by a suddenly disinterested music press.

Shortly after the release of Mark of the Mole, the Residents purchased one of the first ever E-mu Emulator samplers, number #00005 specifically. The instrument was revolutionary for the band, as the sampling capacities of the keyboard not only allowed them to recreate instruments the members were not able to play, but also gave them the opportunity to create their meticulously crafted studio sound in a live setting. The first album the band recorded using the emulator was The Tunes of Two Cities, the second part of the Mole Trilogy, which was nearly entirely recorded using the Emulator.

Following the release of Cities, the Residents also released the EP Intermission. Then they started rehearsing for a possible live show, eventually developing their first touring project, the Mole Show, a theatrical retelling of their Mark of the Mole album. The band debuted the show with a test performance, on April 10, 1982, before a tour of California in October, and a European tour throughout mid 1983. The show featured Penn Jillette as the narrator, playing a similar role as he had previously done with the Ralph Records 10th Anniversary radio special.

A third leg, featuring dates in New York, was booked, but had to be cancelled after one performance due to lack of funding. Following the Mole Show, the band was broke, and as such attempted to recoup some of their losses with several archival releases, including a collection of outtakes called Residue in 1983, and a VHS containing recordings from the Mole Show as well as a newly scored edit of Vileness Fats footage.

==== The American Composers Series, 13th Anniversary Show, and the end of Ralph (1984–1987) ====
Deciding to take a break from part three of the Mole Trilogy, the Residents began a new project entitled the American Composers Series, a planned series of 10 albums which would pay tribute to pop artists and instrumental composers from the United States. The first result of this pairing was George & James, featuring the music of George Gershwin and James Brown. Following the release of George & James, the Residents finally abandoned part three of the Mole Trilogy, choosing instead to record a fourth entry entitled The Big Bubble, featuring very stripped-down instrumentation in order to portray a fictional garage rock band. No further entries into the Mole Trilogy have been recorded, and the project is considered abandoned.

When The Big Bubble was released in Japan by Wave Records, it was an unquestioned success, its popularity resulting in Wave funding a two-week tour of Japan for the group in October 1985. The tour was successful, and re-ignited the group's interest in creating live performances. As a result, they eventually embarked on their 13th Anniversary world tour, ranging from 1985 to 1987, with Snakefinger playing electric guitar. As for studio work, the group eventually released their second entry in the American Composers series, Stars & Hank Forever, featuring the music of Hank Williams and John Philip Sousa. Their version of the Williams song "Kaw-liga" was particularly successful in the emerging club scene.

Due to licensing costs and the emerging CD format, the American Composers series was later abandoned. Stars & Hank Forever was the last Residents project Snakefinger played on, as he died of a heart attack in July 1987.

Following the release of the 13th Anniversary Show LP in 1986 and a cover of "Hit the Road Jack" in 1987, the Cryptic Corporation resigned control of Ralph Records over to Tom & Sheenah Timony, and the Residents signed to Rykodisc. Tom and Sheenah later turned Ralph into a new label, T.E.C. Tones, and established the Residents' official fan club from 1988 to 1993: UWEB (Uncle Willie's Eyeball Buddies).

==== God in Three Persons and Cube E (1987–1990) ====
After two compilation CDs titled Heaven? and Hell!, the Residents' first new project for Ryko was titled God in Three Persons, an hour-long poem in the form of a spoken-word rock opera. This was the first new Residents album to be released on CD, and the last Residents project to be entirely recorded on analog tape, as the group moved on to MIDI technology; their first venture into MIDI was scoring episodes for Pee-wee's Playhouse in 1987. Despite initially mixed critical and commercial reaction, God in Three Persons today is considered one of the group's masterworks.

On November 18, 1988, at a party in Amsterdam for Boudisque Records, the Residents' European label, they premiered a new work titled Buckaroo Blues, a suite of cowboy songs. After a choreographed TELE5 appearance in April 1989, this suite was coupled with a second one titled Black Barry, a suite of "black music" (that is, blues and gospel), and formed the first act of the Residents' next touring project, Cube-E: The History of American Music in 3EZ Pieces. After the show's debut in New York, on July 21, 1989, it was decided to add a third act consisting of covers of Elvis Presley songs, completing the equation "Cowboy music + Black music = Rock and roll." The show took on a much more theatrical approach than the 13th Anniversary tour, with elaborate set designs, costumes, lighting and choreography. Cube-E toured from September 1989 to November 1990, and was successful, both critically and financially.

A studio version of the third act was also released and titled The King & Eye. The album was recorded at Different Fur Studios and released on Enigma Records around the time the tour began in September 1989. Further television work was also being done for MTV, with the Residents scoring and doing voice work for Liquid Television and the Henry Selick-directed pilot "Slow Bob in the Lower Dimensions".

=== 1990–1997: Multimedia projects ===
==== Freak Show, CD-ROMs, and the 25th anniversary (1991–1997) ====
Recordings for a new studio album were worked on during breaks in the Cube-E tour, and shortly after the tour, Freak Show was released. An album detailing the lives and personalities of fictional carnival freaks, the Freak Show project spawned many other iterations, such as a graphic novel in collaboration with comic artists from Dark Horse, such as Brian Bolland and Matt Howarth, and a promotional video created with the help of New York artist John Sanborn, which also presented a music video for "Harry the Head", animated by computer artist Jim Ludtke; both artists went on to collaborate with the Residents on many further projects.

A partnership with Voyager in 1992 allowed the Residents to develop a laserdisc titled Twenty Twisted Questions to celebrate their twentieth anniversary. Along with this laserdisc, a studio album was recorded, titled Our Finest Flowers. Not quite a "greatest hits" compilation, many tracks on the album borrow elements from previous songs in the Residents' catalog.

The Residents' collaboration with Jim Ludtke resulted in the creation of the Freak Show and Bad Day on the Midway CD-ROMs. Both of these projects featured many other collaborations with visual artists, including returning collaborators from the Freak Show graphic novel, such as Richard Sala and Dave McKean. The Residents enjoyed quite a bit of critical and financial success with these CD-ROMs, winning several industry awards. However, during early development stages for a third CD-ROM, titled I Murdered Mommy, their distributor Inscape was forced to dissolve due to oversaturation and obsoletion of the CD-ROM market.

Despite majorly occupying themselves with CD-ROM development, the Residents still remained musically active, releasing an enhanced CD album titled Gingerbread Man (an observation and study of nine fictional characters) in 1994, and scoring the Discovery Channel documentary series Hunters in 1995. Freak Show also got a live adaptation in November 1995, at the Archa Theater in Prague. While the Residents did act as music and stage directors for the show, they did not actually perform; the music was conducted and performed by Czech band Už Jsme Doma, while actors and dancers played their roles on stage.

Freak Show Live was the last iteration of the Freak Show brand; while a DVD was being developed in 2003, the early death of animator Jim Ludtke immediately halted the project.

Around this time, singer/performer Molly Harvey was recruited to work with the group. While her first appearance in a Residents project was the Gingerbread Man album, she officially became a member of the group in 1997, with a one-off performance at the Popkomm festival in Germany titled Disfigured Night. This performance later became the second act of a special 25th anniversary show at the Fillmore in San Francisco, in October 1997.

=== 1998–2009: New collaborators / The 2nd millennium ===
==== Return to touring: Wormwood, Icky Flix, and Demons Dance Alone (1998–2005) ====
Due to the collapse of the CD-ROM market, a collective decision was made to tour again. While keeping up with their theatrical tendencies by regular use of costumes and stage props, the Residents also performed and recorded with a team of guest musicians: the aforementioned Molly Harvey (vocals), Nolan Cook (guitar), Carla Fabrizio (arrangements and vocals), Toby Dammit (drums), and later on in 2002, Eric Drew Feldman (keyboards). Some of the band members, notably Feldman and Fabrizio, went on to collaborate with the group on numerous other projects up until the present time, while Cook eventually became a full-time band member. Fabrizio's connections with the Balinese gamelan ensemble Gamelan Sekar Jaya allowed for occasional collaborations between the two groups during this period.

The first tour with this new band formation was for the 1998 album Wormwood, a collection of songs depicting typically gruesome stories from the Holy Bible, mostly from the Old Testament. While the studio album only featured Harvey, Fabrizio and Dammit as guests (with Dammit only taking occasional vocal duties), the band was mostly fully formed by the time of the show's live debut at the Fillmore in October 1998. The Wormwood show toured up to July 1999, and featured drastically different arrangements of songs from the album, mostly darker and heavier, as well as new or unused material related to the concept. Some of these arrangements were recorded for a studio album titled Roadworms, and a DVD of the live show was released in 2005.

The same band formation later toured to promote the Residents' first DVD, Icky Flix, a compilation of most of the group's music videos, as well as new animated videos and a re-recorded soundtrack, to celebrate the group's upcoming 30th anniversary. These re-recorded arrangements were performed on the show as their corresponding videos played from the DVD onto a screen.

On the event of the September 11 attacks, the Residents were still touring Icky Flix in Europe. The resulting fear and anxiety caused by the attacks resulted in the recording of Demons Dance Alone in 2002. While not a direct response to the events, the songs on the album portrayed the negative emotions felt by the group and its individual members; this was reflected in the album's subsequent tour, which took place from October 2002 to September 2003. The group's next major album, the 2005 Animal Lover, contained lyrics of a similarly tragic nature, although in a more abstract manner. The album also contained a booklet with stories which presented the songs from the point of view of animals. Animal Lover was also the first Residents album to be released on the Mute label, which was solely responsible for the Residents' major releases until 2008.

Animal Lover was the last Residents album to feature Molly Harvey, who moved to Atlanta to live with her husband. Her last appearance as regular performer in the Residents was The Way We Were mini-tour at the "What is Music?" festival in Australia.

=== 2005–2009: The "Storyteller" era ===
==== Narrative albums and The Bunny Boy (2006–2009) ====
Due to the increasing numbers of illegal downloads of music on the Internet, which considerably decreased product sales, the Residents attempted a new artistic medium: the radio drama, in the form of a paid podcast distributed through Apple's iTunes service. This podcast, titled The River of Crime (a first-person tale of an individual's obsession with crime and criminals), ran for five weekly episodes in 2006 before its cancellation due to inconveniences surrounding the podcast's promotion on iTunes, thereby discouraging further production.

Aside from Animal Lover, the group's partnership with Mute produced three more albums: Tweedles in 2006 (a first-person character study of a sexually successful yet emotionally unavailable vampiric figure), The Voice of Midnight in 2007 (a retelling of the E.T.A. Hoffmann story Der Sandmann), and The Bunny Boy in 2008 (a first-person narrative and character study of the titular Bunny in search of his missing brother).

While Tweedles and The Voice of Midnight have not yet been developed further (aside from instrumental releases such as The UGHS! in 2009), The Bunny Boy proved a very accessible concept. A YouTube video series of the same name was done to promote and further elaborate on the project. The series was partially interactive; fans could communicate with Bunny via e-mail, and some of the interactions may or may not have altered the course of the series' plot (a book containing some of Bunny's correspondence was published by Bandits Mages in 2019). Soon afterwards the album was toured from October to December 2008. A second season of the video series was shown in 2009, concluding the project.

=== 2010–2016: Randy, Chuck & Bob ===
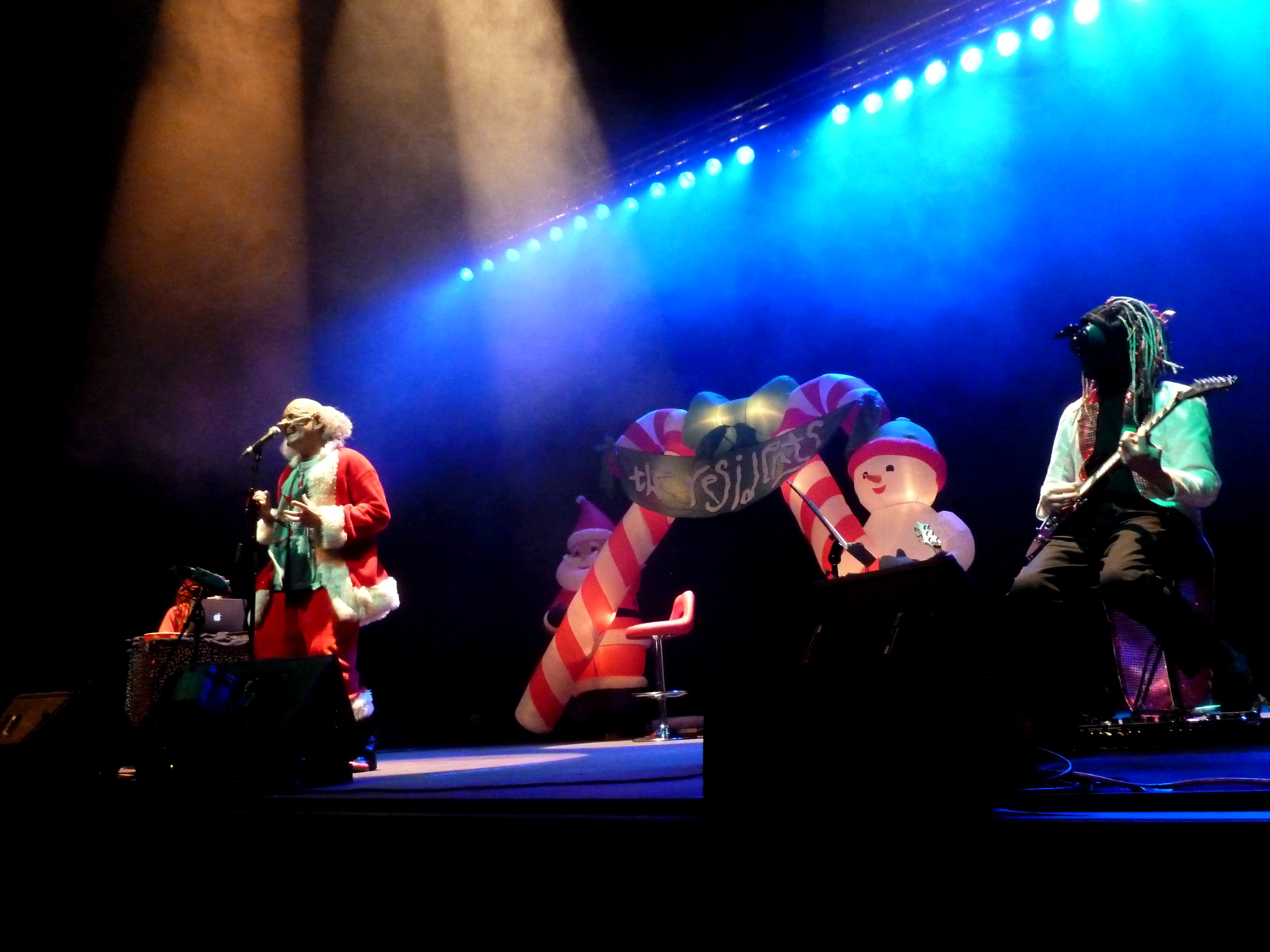
The Residents in 2013 on their Wonder of Weird 40th Anniversary Tour

Making a decision to shift focus from studio work to touring, and to enhance their show's portability, the Residents changed their live band to a "power trio" formation, and in a sort of meta stunt, appear to "unmask" themselves as lead singer / frontman "Randy", composer / keyboardist "Charles 'Chuck' Bobuck", and guitarist Nolan Cook as "Bob" – although all three band members were still costumed: "Randy" donned an old man mask and wore an overcoat with oversized red tie and shoes; "Chuck" and "Bob" wore red jackets, special goggles and fake dreadlocks. There was also mention of a fourth band member, drummer "Carlos", who allegedly had left the music business to take care of his mother in Mexico; however, despite being credited as singer in the group's 2012 album Coochie Brake, there is no further evidence of "Carlos" having ever been a real band member.

This new band formation debuted in the Talking Light tour, which ran from January 2010 to April 2011. While the setlist once again consisted of assorted songs from the band's repertoire with greatly reworked arrangements, the show also featured newly written "ghost stories", in which a video of a narrator was projected onto the stage while the band improvised. These "ghost stories" were loosely threaded by the presence of television, TV commercials, and industrialized products such as Oscar Mayer hot dogs or Betty Crocker Pudding Roll-ups – although these were not endorsements; these products were simply a minor element integrated into the stories, not unlike product placement. In between certain songs, "Randy" also spoke to the audience, introducing the band and later describing his own history with supernatural appearances, and his subsequent fear of mirrors. The tour was financially successful, and the band continued to perform in this formation with only minor changes in stage and costume design.

In the next couple of years, "Randy" took on an increased role as frontman of the band, starting a "personal" Tumblr blog where he wrote mostly about life experiences and trivia regarding the Residents' history, as well as promoting his "solo" show, Sam's Enchanted Evening, which was presented in various incarnations between June 2010 and March 2012 with collaborators Joshua Raoul Brody and Carla Fabrizio. More akin to musical theater than a concert, the show focused on the titular Sam's life story, with the singer alternating between monologues and cover performances of various songs that were important in his life. During this period, the Residents also collaborated with Belgian dancer/choreographer Grace Ellen Barkey from Needcompany, composing the music for a show titled Mush-Room in 2013.

In 2014, "Randy" maintained a series of vlogs with the help of director Don Hardy, titled In My Room and later Randyland, elaborating further on his experiences, both with the Residents and with events in his personal life. The blog currently has been inactive since January 6, 2019. Composer "Charles Bobuck" also maintained a series of personal writings on the Residents' website titled The Test Tube of Tomorrow, and occasionally release music under this name, usually material deemed unfitting for the Residents concept. Bobuck's writings were much more detailed and biographical, and his music much more abstract, often referred to as "contraptions" rather than compositions.

The group's 40th anniversary tour, The Wonder of Weird, also elaborated on the "Randy, Chuck & Bob" concept, although guised as an anthology show – lead singer Randy once more spoke to the audience between songs, briefly discussing the band's history as he slowly grew depressed with the state of the band and his own life, occasionally leaving the stage and prompting the remaining band members to improvise. The show toured from January to May 2013.

This band formation toured once more in 2014 with a show called Shadowland, retrofittingly subtitled "part three of the 'Randy, Chuck & Bob' trilogy". Initially a one-off week of performances in Europe, the show was eventually brought back in March 2015, coinciding with the premiere of the Theory of Obscurity film – a documentary on the history of the band, directed by Don Hardy and produced by Barton Bishoff and Josh Keppel – at the SXSW Film Festival. This show was the last time "Charles Bobuck" performed with the band, as he decided to quit the touring business due to increasing health problems. He eventually quit the Residents altogether in 2016, revealing his identity as Hardy Fox of the Cryptic Corporation, and continued to make music as a solo artist until his death in October 2018.

Shadowland then toured from August 2015 to July 2016, with Eric Drew Feldman (as Bobuck's cousin "Rico") replacing Fox on keyboards, as well as production on future Residents projects. The show was mostly similar to the previous two tours, with a setlist of various reworked songs from the group's repertoire, and occasional video interludes in the vein of Talking Light, with different characters discussing their experiences with birth, reincarnation and near-death.

=== 2017–present: Metal Meat & Bone, Triple Trouble and the pREServed series ===
In March 2017, the Residents presented their new lineup, advertised as "The Real Residents": "Tyrone" on vocals, "Eekie" (Nolan Cook) on guitar, "Erkie" (Eric Feldman) on keyboards, and "Cha Cha" on drums and percussion. Shortly after a preview of their In Between Dreams tour in Japan, the group released their first studio album since Coochie Brake, titled The Ghost of Hope, describing real train wreck stories from the 19th and early 20th century. The album was released on Cherry Red Records, the Residents' current label, and promoted with a single, and their first music video since 2001's Icky Flix – "Rushing Like a Banshee", directed by John Sanborn. Although The Ghost of Hope was not toured, the Residents played both sides of the "Rushing Like a Banshee" single on the In Between Dreams show, which ran from October 2017 up to February 2019 and followed a loose theme, much like Shadowland, this time of dreams.

During the tour, the Residents worked on new projects. Their next album, Intruders, released in October 2018, was advertised along with the I am a Resident! concept, which started as a sort of officially endorsed tribute project: fans would submit their interpretations of Residents songs, and the group would collect their favorites into an album. After the number of submissions vastly exceeded their expectations, the group decided to change the project into a type of collage, even recording segments and overdubs of their own. The final album was released to contributors in May 2018, and worldwide in August 2018.

In July 2018, the Residents also published their second novel (the first being a novelization of their game Bad Day on the Midway in 2012). The book, entitled The Brick-Eaters, was described as "an absurdist buddy movie story featuring a very tall internet content screener teaming up with an aging career criminal whose primary companions are an oxygen bottle and a .44 Magnum".

The group also began their ongoing pREServed reissue series in January 2018 – deluxe editions of the major albums in the band's discography, containing brand new remasters and unreleased recordings from the band's archives, previously in the care of Hardy Fox before he quit the group.

During the In Between Dreams tour, the Residents also previewed songs from their "upcoming blues album", which was eventually titled Metal, Meat & Bone: The Songs of Dyin' Dog. The premise of the album was to present the long-lost recordings of a fictional albino blues singer named Alvin Snow, also known as "Dyin' Dog". The Residents would present the original "Dyin' Dog demos" on one disc and their own interpretations of the same songs on another disc. The album was released in July 2020 and promoted with two music videos for the Residents' new versions of "Bury My Bone" and "DIE! DIE! DIE!", the latter being sung by alternative rock musician and Pixies frontman Black Francis.

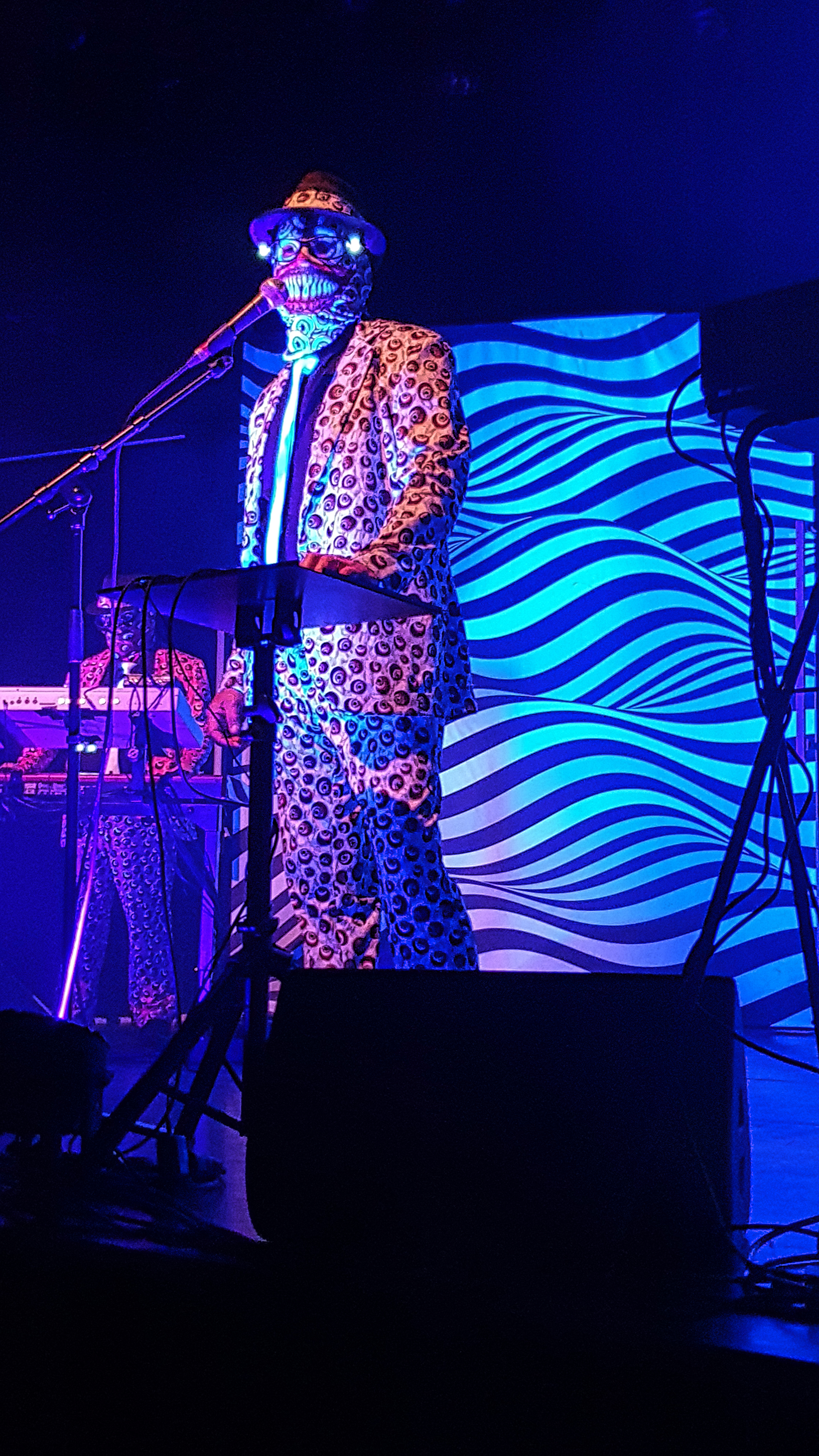
Dog Stab Tour at Mousonturm Frankfurt 20 February 2023

Metal, Meat & Bone was promoted during the Residents' 'Dog Stab!' tour in 2021 (following numerous cancellations and postponements on account of the COVID-19 pandemic) – the show, currently marketed as "the 50th anniversary show", presented songs from the new album as well as new arrangements of songs from their 1978 album, Duck Stab / Buster & Glen.

To celebrate the group's 50th anniversary, a retrospective coffee table book, The Residents: A Sight for Sore Eyes, Vol. 1 by author Aaron Tanner, was announced. The book contains never-before-seen photos, quotes from celebrities influenced by the group, and a 7" single dating to the group's Not Available era.

On May 13 and 14 2022, the Residents performed their God In Three Persons album live two more times, at the Presidio Theatre in San Francisco. The Residents presented themselves as a six-piece band at this show, with visuals created by John Sanborn. The visuals featured videos starring Jiz Lee, who portrays the twins.

The Residents' film Triple Trouble debuted in Chicago on July 29, 2022. It is composed of new footage shot during the COVID-19 pandemic and includes material from the Vileness Fats project.

On January 26, 2023, The Residents embarked on their 50th anniversary tour. On certain dates of the tour, the show accompanied screenings of their debut feature film Triple Trouble. The tour saw the group perform a free webcast show at WXPN on March 31.

== Identity ==
In the group's early days, many rumors circulated about its membership. As the cover art of Meet the Residents was a parody of the Beatles' 1964 North American release, Meet the Beatles!, rumors circulated that the Residents were actually the Beatles, even specifically naming George Harrison. Many other rumors have come and gone over the years, one being that 1960's experimental band Cromagnon shared members with the band. Les Claypool, frontman of rock band Primus, and Gerald Casale of new wave band Devo claimed to have been rumored to have been members of the band; and Mark Mothersbaugh (also of Devo) is alleged to have played keyboards during the band's 13th-anniversary tour.

Since the late 1970s, much of the speculation about the members' identities has involved the group's management team, the Cryptic Corporation. It was formed in 1976 as a corporation in California by Jay Clem, Homer Flynn, Hardy W. Fox, and John Kennedy. All but Fox have denied having been band members. Clem and Kennedy left the Corporation in 1982. The Residents members do not grant interviews, although Flynn, Fox, and Clem have conducted interviews on behalf of the group.

In a July 2017 newsletter, Fox confirmed that Jay Clem's voice was featured uncredited on "Whoopy Snorp" and that the Residents often used his voice on early recordings to add a sense of variety. Fox insisted that as Clem became more invested in running Ralph Records, he became less interested in the Residents' studio work and that the Not Available sessions would have been his last time in the studio - although Fox seemed unsure if Clem was involved in the production of that album at all.

Nolan Cook, a prominent collaborator in the band's live and studio work (and a live member of I Am Spoonbender) denied in an interview that Fox and Flynn were the Residents. However, some consider Cook himself a member of the band, as he is known to wear the same head coverings as the group in live shows, and wore the trademark eyeball mask on the Wormwood Tour. He also played the part of "Bob" during the "Randy," "Chuck," and "Bob" trilogy of shows.

William Poundstone, author of the Big Secrets books, compared voiceprints of a Flynn lecture with those of spoken word segments from the Residents discography in his book Biggest Secrets. He concluded, "The similarities in the spectograms second the convincing subjective impression that the voices are identical", and that "it is possible that the creative core of the Residents is the duo of Flynn and Fox." A subset of that belief is that Flynn is the lyricist and that Fox writes the music. The online database of the performance rights organization BMI (of which the Residents and their publishing company, Pale Pachyderm Publishing [Warner-Chappell] have been members for their entire careers) lists Flynn and Fox as the composers of all original Residents songs, including pre-1974 songs from the "Residents Unincorporated" years.

Simon Reynolds wrote in his book Rip It Up and Start Again: Postpunk 1978–1984 that "the Residents and their representatives were one and the same," and elaborated further on one of his blogs, stating that "this was something that anybody who had any direct dealings with Ralph figured out sooner rather than later." Reynolds quotes Helios Creed, who identifies the Residents as a keyboardist named "H," a singer named "Homer," and "this other guy called John." - Creed's only involvement with the Residents was contributing three tracks to the Ralph Records compilation Subterranean Modern in 1979 with his group Chrome; the only group on the compilation to not be signed to Ralph Records. Peter Principle of Tuxedomoon, signed to Ralph between 1979 and 1984, claimed that he and others "eventually figured out that the guy doing the graphics and the engineer in the studio were, in fact, the Residents."

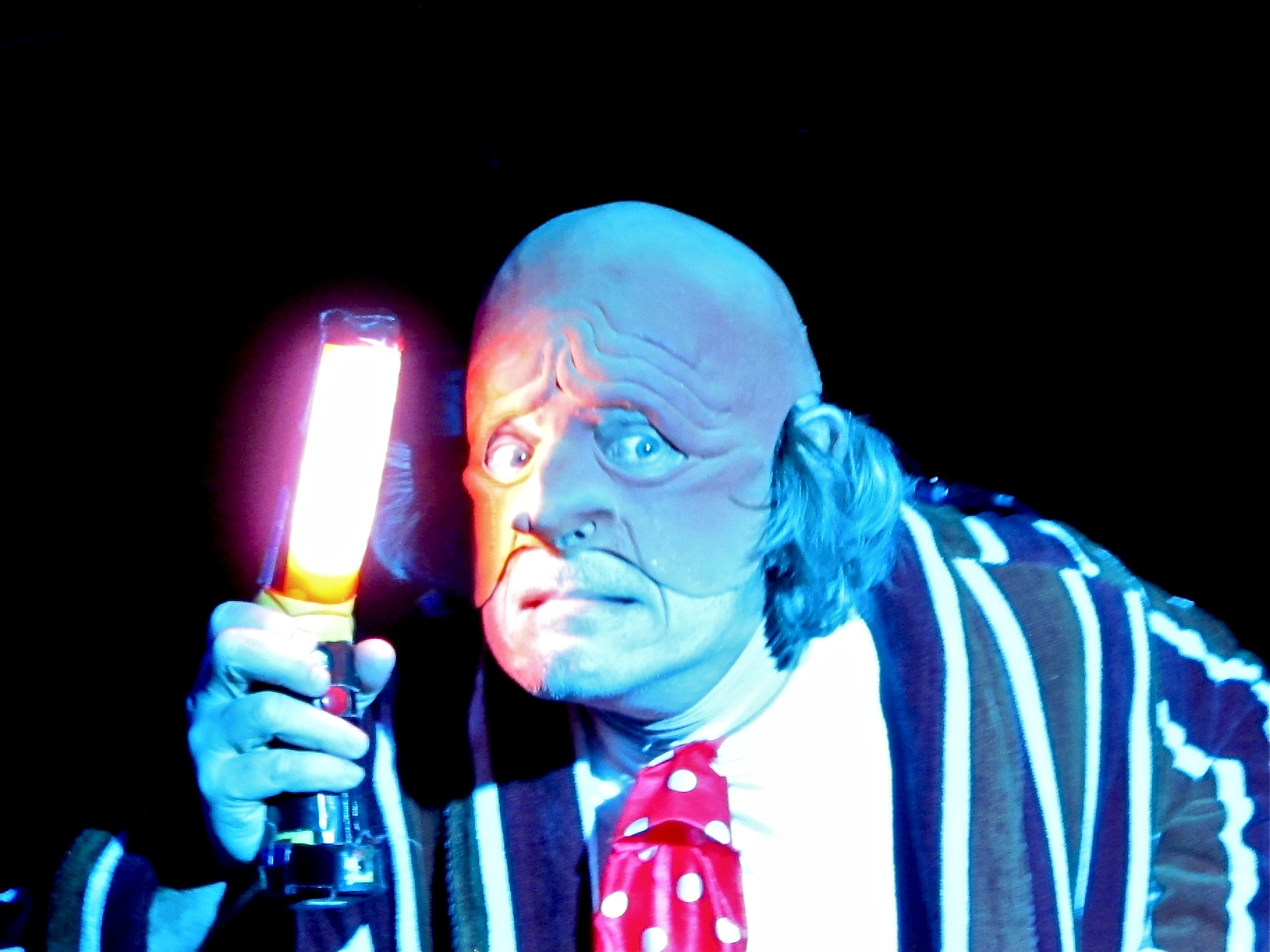
Randy Rose at The Middle East (Cambridge, MA) in 2010

Cryptic openly admits the group's artwork is done by Flynn (among others) under various names that, put together, become "Pornographics", but the pseudonym is rarely spelled the same way twice (examples: Porno Graphics, Pore No Graphix, Pore-Know Graphics); and that Fox is the sound engineer – meaning that he is the main producer, engineer, mixer, and editor of all their recordings. (Since 1976, all of the Residents' recordings have listed their producer as the Cryptic Corporation, presumably meaning Fox in particular.)

From 2010 to 2016, the Residents referred to themselves in concert as the characters "Randy Rose", "Chuck Bobuck", and "Bob", and referred to a former member of the band, "Carlos", who left the group following a disagreement with "Randy". There is speculation that "Carlos" is Carlos Cadona. Better known by his stage name, "6025," Cadona was in the original lineup of the Dead Kennedys and appears on a live album by Snakefinger. "Carlos" may also refer to Carla Fabrizio, a touring member of the Residents from 1998 to 2008.

"Bob" is speculated to be guitarist and longtime collaborator Nolan Cook, as Cook is often the only credited collaborator on the "Randy, Chuck, & Bob" albums, such as Talking Light: Bimbo's and Shadowland.

"Chuck", or "Charles Bobuck", was the group's primary songwriter; he also released a series of solo albums (or "contraptions") under this name during the "Randy, Chuck and Bob" era. Chuck retired from live performance due to ill health in 2015, and ultimately retired from the Residents altogether following the release of the Theory of Obscurity documentary film. Eric Drew Feldman replaced him and performed under the name "Rico" from 2015 to 2016.

In the liner notes featured on the 2020 reissue of Phillip Perkins' King of the World album, Perkins confirms that he was a member of the Residents during their Assorted Secrets lineup, best known for The Mole Show. On his BayImproviser biography Perkins states that he worked closely with the Residents between 1979 and 1984. He had previously been credited as the lighting designer on the Mole Show Roxy LP, and as engineer on original versions of Stars & Hank Forever, as well as on reissues of The Tune of Two Cities and The Snakey Wake. Considering this, his time working with the group roughly would have been from 1979 to 1987. In a 2021 interview, Perkins nonchalantly referred to his fellow players on The Mole Show as 'H' and 'Homer' on Emulators and 'Tom' on Roland Jupiter 8.

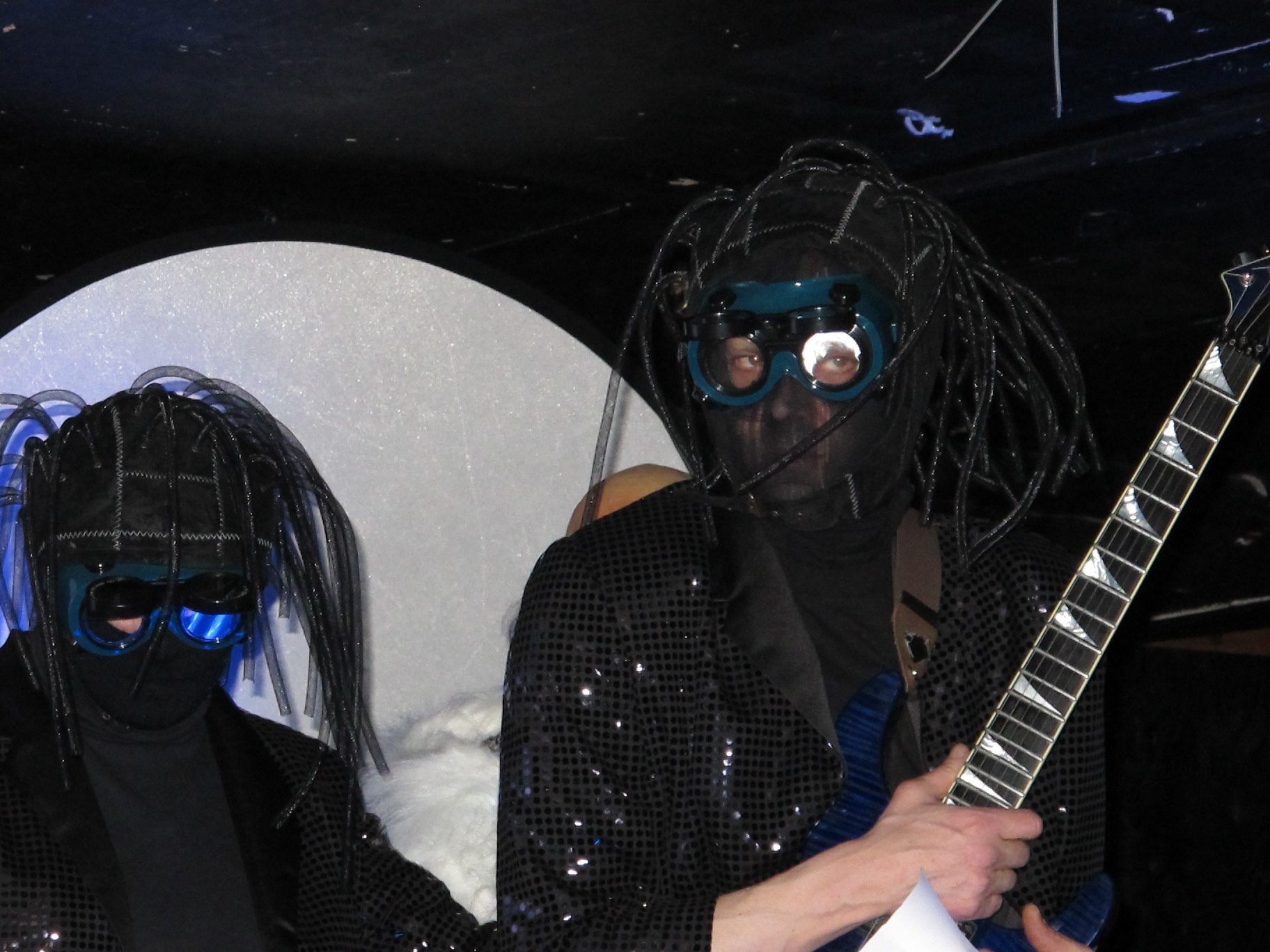
Hardy Fox (Left) and Bob (Right) at The Middle East (Cambridge, MA) in 2010

=== Hardy Fox ===
In October 2017, former Residents manager Hardy Fox identified himself as both the anonymous primary composer and producer for the Residents as well as the pseudonymous Charles Bobuck. Fox was born in Longview, Texas, where his father worked in the oil industry; his mother was a nurse. The family moved several times, and Fox graduated from Rayville High School in Louisiana in 1963. He then studied art and business at Louisiana Tech University, where he met Homer Flynn, and graduated in 1967.

In September 2018, Fox added to his website the dates "1945–2018", although he was known to be alive (but unwell) after the dates were published. Fox died on October 30, 2018, from brain cancer, aged 73. He was identified in obituaries as the co-founder and primary composer of the Residents. On December 14, 2018, the official Residents mailing list acknowledged Fox as "engineer, producer and sometime composer of much of the Residents’ best-loved work".

=== Frequent collaborators ===
==== Pre-Residents ====
Since their inception, the Residents have had a number of credited collaborators.

During the band's formative years, the group's primary members consisted of 'the Singing Resident', Hardy Fox, pianist James Whittaker, and bassist Bob Tagney, the latter two of which were credited as writers on the 2018 LP release of The Warner Brothers Album. This lineup, along with Snakefinger, who joined the group in Autumn of 1971, are credited as members of The Delta Nudes, (a retroactive group name applied to recordings involving members of the Residents made prior to 1974,) on the 2013 demos compilation, the Delta Nudes' Greatest Hiss. Bob Tagney and James Whittaker are also credited on the band's debut album, Meet the Residents; Whittaker, as the pianist on "Spotted Pinto Bean", and Tagney as bassist on "Infant Tango". Female vocalist Pamela Zeibak was also among the group's regular collaborators at this time, with credits on The Delta Nudes Greatest Hiss, Meet the Residents, The Third Reich 'n Roll, and Fingerprince. She also performed vocals on 'Spotted Pinto Bean' at the group's debut live performance in 1976. Also performing at that live show was Snakefinger, and drummer Don Jakovich.

==== 1976–1983 ====
Snakefinger had relocated to the US earlier that year, and continued his collaborations with the Residents, and was credited on all their albums (minus Not Available) from Fingerprince to Commercial Album. During this period, he also released two solo albums, which the Residents co-produced and co-wrote. In 1981 he began writing and recording material without their involvement, and only appeared on a small handful of tracks on their albums from The Tunes of Two Cities to Stars & Hank Forever. Despite this lessened involvement in the studio, Snakefinger also toured with the Residents as an unmasked guest from October 1985 to January 1987, before his death on July 1, 1987.

Don Jakovich, made credited appearances on "Satisfaction," Fingerprince, Snakefinger's Chewing Hides the Sound, and Commercial Album.

Joshua Raoul Brody began working with the Residents shortly before their 1976 live show, after he was invited to the set of their film Vileness Fats. After this, he began collaborating with the group anonymously, arranging the backing vocals on 1976 cover of "(I Can't Get No) Satisfaction". In the 1980s, Brody began to receive credit for his work with the Residents under the pseudonym "Raoul N. Di Seimbote", but by 1987, was using his birth name. Brody worked with the Residents as late on their 2023 'Secret' live show.

Following the disbanding of Henry Cow, former members Chris Cutler and Fred Frith began making appearances on Residents material. Frith first appeared with the Residents on the Subterranean Modern compilation, and Cutler on the Eskimo album. The following year both featured on Commercial Album, with Frith receiving the credit of 'Extra Hard Working Guest Musician'.

Nessie Lessons, the wife of Hardy Fox, began to make appearances on Residents releases between 1980 and 1983. Initially as an uncredited female vocalist, Lessons was first credited on The Tunes of Two Cities, toured with the band from 1982 to 1983. Her final work as a regular collaborator was on the song "HellNo", for the soundtrack to the 1984 film The Census Taker, and was later featured on Our Finest Flowers.

==== 1984–1993 ====
For their touring Mole Show, the Residents employed four dancers: Kathleen French, Carol Werner LeMaitre, Sarah McLennan Walker and Chris Van Ralte. Carol LeMaitre and Sarah McLennan went on to portray two Residents on stage during the 13th Anniversary Show and also performed interpretive dance in Cube-E.

Starting in 1987, the Residents began working with female vocalist Laurie Amat, who went on to become the Residents' primary female vocalist for much of the 1990s, with her final role as a regular collaborator was on the 1998 Wormwood album. Another female vocalist from this period was Diane Alden, who first appeared on the Freak Show album; she once again worked with the group until Wormwood. Tony Janssen, who was first credited as an engineer on the band's Cube-E album, eventually became a male vocalist for the band and provided the voice of Tex the Barker in their Freak Show projects.

==== 1994–2014 ====
During recording of their Gingerbread Man album, the Singing Resident met future singer Molly Harvey at a coffee shop; he invited her to record vocals for the song "The Old Woman". Following this she became a regular member of the Residents' team of collaborators, and appeared on all of their major albums and live shows until 2005's Animal Lover. Also appearing for the first time on Gingerbread Man was Isabelle Barbier, a young actress who made occasional appearances with the Residents, including The Ghost of Hope in 2017.

The Residents' 1998–2000 Wormwood project introduced three important figures in Residents history, Carla Fabrizio, Nolan Cook and Toby Dammit. Dammit briefly played with the Residents live from 1999 to 2003, and all three of them performed on the Demons Dance Alone album. Carla appeared with the Residents on stage until the 2008 Bunny Boy tour, and has worked with the band on their studio albums as recently as Metal, Meat and Bone, released in 2020. Nolan Cook acted as the Residents' lead guitarist both in concert and in the studio from 1999 to 2023.

In the years following Molly Harvey's departure, professional voice actress Gerri Lawlor began to make regular appearances on the Residents spoken-word projects, Tweedles, The River of Crime, The Voice of Midnight and Lonely Teenager. Corey Rosen also began working with the Residents during this time, on The River of Crime, The Voice of Midnight, and The Bunny Boy web series.

==== 2015–2024 ====
Following the departure of Hardy Fox in 2015, Eric Drew Feldman was once again asked to help with duties previously undertaken by Fox. Along with Feldman, performers Laurie Hall and Peter Whitehead began appearing on Residents releases starting with The Ghost of Hope. Hall also appeared on Intruders, which introduced Sivan Lioncub.

The line-up of collaborators as featured on the Residents' 2020 album Metal Meat & Bone includes Eric Drew Feldman, Carla Fabrizio, Nolan Cook, Peter Whitehead, Sivan Lioncub and Rob Laufer. Their 2022 Triple Trouble soundtrack album features Eric Drew Feldman as co-writer, co-arranger and co-producer along with the Residents; Feldman is the only credited musical collaborator on this release. Their 2023 God In 3 Persons concert film credits Mr. X (vocals), Nolan Cook (guitars), Eric Drew Feldman (keyboards), and Warren Huegel (drums).

On February 20, 2024, the Residents publicly announced they would no longer be working with Nolan Cook. Cook later revealed in a Facebook comment that he had ceased working with the Residents on April 20th, 2023, but had intended to partake in their cancelled April 2024 tour.

==== 2025–present ====
The group's 2025 album, Doctor Dark, featured guest performances by Isabelle Barbier, Peter Whitehead, Sivan Lioncub, Rob Laufer and Warren Huegel, all of whom had been credited on previous projects by the group, with co-production and co-arrangements by Eric Drew Feldman.

== Artistry ==
=== Musical style ===
The Residents' albums generally fall into two categories: deconstructions of Western popular music, and complex conceptual pieces composed around a theme, theory or plot. The group is noted for surrealistic lyrics and sound, with a disregard for conventional music composition. The Residents' musical style encompasses elements of art rock, art pop, avant-pop, avant-rock, electronic, industrial, dark ambient, ambient, electronica, industrial dance, talking blues, alternative rock, noise rock and post-punk. The Residents have been described as pioneers of punk rock, art rock and techno.

=== Influences ===
The Residents have claimed to have been influenced by N. Senada (which may be a play on Ensenada, en se nada meaning "in himself nothing," no sé nada meaning "I don't know anything" or enseñada, a form of the past participle meaning "taught"), who they alleged was a Bavarian composer and music theorist who formulated the "Theory of Obscurity" and the "Theory of Phonetic Organization". His "Theory of Obscurity" states that an artist can only produce pure art when the expectations and influences of the outside world are not taken into consideration; while his "Theory of Phonetic Organization" states, "the musician should put the sounds first, building the music up from [them] rather than developing the music, then working down to the sounds that make it up."

There is a debate as to whether or not Senada, supposedly having been born in 1907 and dying in 1993 at the age of 86, actually existed, or was simply an invention of the Residents. It is frequently speculated that, if real, N. Senada may have been the famous avant-garde composer and instrument designer Harry Partch, the influence of whose work may be heard in Residents compositions such as "Six Things to a Cycle"; his death is also referenced in the song "Death in Barstow". Another rumor speculates that N. Senada may have been Captain Beefheart, because in the late 1960s Beefheart and his "Magic Band" lived in a residence on Ensenada Drive in Woodland Hills, California, while recording Trout Mask Replica and Safe as Milk; Beefheart's influence can also be heard in early Residents works. The Residents also sent an early demo tape to the Warner Brothers executive Hal Halverstadt, who had signed Beefheart.

According to the Residents, in 1937, N. Senada premiered his masterpiece, Pollex Christi, which means either Thumb of Christ or Big Toe of Christ. This work mainly consisted of borrowed pieces from other composers, namely Beethoven's Symphony No. 5 and Carl Orff's Carmina Burana, among others. He also left large holes in the work so that the performers could insert music of their choosing, thus "becoming composers themselves". Senada justified his work with "house" analogies claiming that he did not make the "bricks" but "cemented them together"; he was not the "architect", just the "builder". N. Senada allegedly collaborated with the Residents on their work prior to Santa Dog and Meet the Residents, and then disappeared. He resurfaced in the mid-1970s, returning from an Arctic expedition and bearing a sealed bottle of pure Arctic air; this served as inspiration for the Eskimo project.

== Discography ==
=== Studio albums ===
- Meet the Residents (1974)
- The Third Reich 'n Roll (1976)
- Fingerprince (1977)
- Not Available (1978)
- Duck Stab!/Buster and Glen (1978)
- Eskimo (1979)
- Commercial Album (1980)
- Mark of the Mole (1981)
- The Tunes of Two Cities (1982)
- Title in Limbo with Renaldo and the Loaf (1983)
- George & James (1984)
- Whatever Happened to Vileness Fats? (1984)
- The Big Bubble (1985)
- Stars & Hank Forever! (1986)
- God in Three Persons (1988)
- Buckaroo Blues (1989)
- The King & Eye (1989)
- Freak Show (1990)
- Our Finest Flowers (1992)
- Gingerbread Man (1994)
- Hunters (1995)
- Have a Bad Day (1996)
- Wormwood: Curious Stories from the Bible (1998)
- Roadworms: The Berlin Sessions (2000)
- Icky Flix (2001)
- Demons Dance Alone (2002)
- 12 Days of Brumalia (2004)
- Animal Lover (2005)
- Tweedles! (2006)
- Night of the Hunters (2007)
- The Voice of Midnight (2007)
- The Bunny Boy (2008)
- Postcards from Patmos (2008)
- Hades (2009)
- Dollar General (2010)
- Lonely Teenager (2011)
- Chuck's Ghost Music (2010)
- Night Train to Nowhere! (2012)
- Bad Day on the Midway: Music from the Game Reconsidered (2012)
- Mush-Room (2013)
- The Ghost of Hope (2017)
- Intruders (2018)
- Metal, Meat & Bone: The Songs of Dyin' Dog (2020)
- Doctor Dark (2025)

=== Outtake compilations ===
- The Residents Radio Special (1977; 1983)
- Residue of the Residents (1983)
- Assorted Secrets (1984)
- The Census Taker (1985)
- Stranger Than Supper (1990)
- Our Tired, Our Poor, Our Huddled Masses (1997)
- Dot.com (1969–2000)
- Petting Zoo (2002)
- Animal Lover Instrumental (2008)
- Smell My Picture (2008)
- The Bridegroom of Blood (2009)
- Ten Little Piggies (2009)
- El Año del Muerto (2009)
- Arkansas (2009)
- The Ughs! (2009)
- Tabasco: Tweedles Instrumental (2010)
- Night Train to Nowhere! (2012)
- Ten Two Times (2013)
- Music to Eat Bricks By (2019)
- A Nickle If Your Dick's This Big (2019)
- Eyeful (2020)
- Anganok (2020)
- Leftovers Again?! (2021)
- Leftovers Again?! Again!?! (2025)

=== Live albums ===
- The Mole Show (1983)
- Live in Japan (1986)
- Live in the USA! (1986)
- Live in Holland (1987)
- Buckaroo Blues and Black Barry (1989)
- Mole Show: Live in Holland (1989)
- Liver Music (1990)
- Cube E: Live in Holland (1990)
- Daydream B-Liver (1991)
- Live at the Fillmore (1998)
- Wormwood Live 1999 (1999)
- Demons Dance Alone DVD (2002)
- Kettles of Fish On the Outskirts of Town (2003)
- The Residents Play Wormwood (2005)
- The Way We Were (2005)
- JJJ 105.7 Radio Show (2009)
- Icky Flix Live (2009)
- Prague and Beyond (2009)
- Adobe Disfigured Night (2009)
- The Malboro Eyeball Experience (2009)
- Oh Mummy! Oh Daddy! Can't You See That It's True; What the Beatles Did to Me, I Love Lucy Did to You (2010)
- Ritz NY (2010)
- Brava (2010)
- Talking Light Bimbo's (2011)
- Cube-E Dynasone 3EZ EP (2011)
- Triple Dub-Ya (2012)
- The Wonder of Weird (2014)
- Demonic! (2013)
- The Wonder of Weird (2014)
- Cleveland (2014)
- Shadowland (2015)
- Disfigured Night (2016)
- In Between Dreams (2019)
- Dreaming of an Eyeball Beaming (2019)
- Bunny Boy: Live in Frankfurt (2021)
- God In 3 Persons Live (2020)
- Duck! Stab! Alive! (2021)
- Secret Show: Live In San Francisco (2024)

=== Extended plays and singles ===
- Santa Dog EP (1972)
- "Satisfaction" (1976)
- The Beatles Play the Residents and the Residents Play the Beatles (1977)
- Duck Stab! (1978)
- "Santa Dog '78" (1978)
- Diskomo (1980)
- Commercial Single (1980)
- Intermission (1982)
- "It's a Man's Man's Man's World" (1984)
- "Kaw-liga" (1986)
- "Hit the Road Jack" (1987)
- Snakey Wake for Snakefinger (fan-club release, 1988)
- "Double Shot" (1988)
- "Holy Kiss of Flesh" (1988)
- "Don't Be Cruel" (1989)
- "Rushing Like a Banshee" (2016)
- "Die! Die! Die!" (2020)
- "Bury My Bone" (2020)
- "Dookietown" (2024)
- "Eskimo Folk Tales" (2026)

=== Videos and films ===
- Vileness Fats (1972-76, unfinished)
- The Mole Show/Whatever Happened to Vileness Fats? (1984)
- The Eyes Scream: A History of the Residents (1991)
- Twenty Twisted Questions (1992)
- Icky Flix (2001)
- Eskimo (2002)
- Disfigured Night (2002)
- Demons Dance Alone (2003)
- The Commercial DVD (2004)
- The Residents Play Wormwood (2005)
- Is Anybody Out There? (2009)
- Randy's Ghost Stories (2010)
- Talking Light Bimbo's (2011)
- Theory of Obscurity: A Film About the Residents (2015)

=== Miscellaneous ===
- Freak Show (1992)
- Freak Show (1994; CD-ROM)
