= Lonely Teenager =

Studio album by The Residents
- Released: 2011
- Recorded: 2011
- Label: MVD Audio/Ralph Records

The Residents chronology
Talking Light Rehearsal (2010)	Lonely Teenager (2011)	Dolor Generar (2011)

Professional ratings
Review scores
Source	Rating
Allmusic	4/5 stars

Lonely Teenager is an album by American art rock band the Residents that was released in 2011. It contains a selection of songs as performed by the band during the Talking Light tour, as well as some songs that were considered for the tour but were rejected.

A limited edition of the album was sold during the Talking Light tour, which included a 2009 rehearsal version of "The Unknown Sister" as a bonus track.

The album notably credits The Residents as Randy, Chuck and Bob, characters created by the band for their 2010 Talking Light tour. The 'Chuck' character would later be used for a majority of Hardy Fox's solo albums.

== Track listing ==
1. "Six More Miles"
2. "My Window"
3. "The Unseen Sister"
4. "The Lizard Lady"
5. "The Sleepwalker"
6. "The Old Woman"
7. "Boxes of Armageddon"
8. "Talking Light"
