= The Bunny Boy =

Studio album by The Residents
- Released: September 1, 2008
- Recorded: 2007–2008
- Genres: Rock; electronic; techno
- Length: 47:52
- Label: MVD Audio / Santa Dog

The Residents chronology
The Voice of Midnight (2007)	The Bunny Boy (2008)	Postcards from Patmos (2008)

Professional ratings
Review scores
Source	Rating
AllMusic	3.5/5 stars

The Bunny Boy is an album by American art rock band the Residents. Released on September 1, 2008, it is a concept album. According to the group's blog, the music was intended to be similar to their previous albums Duck Stab, Commercial Album and Demons Dance Alone and contains "19 fast-paced songs" about "[o]bsession, insanity and the coming Apocalypse". In addition to the Residents, frequent collaborators Nolan Cook, Carla Fabrizio and Joshua Raoul Brody also appear on the album.

A tour started in October, and a narrative Internet series also appeared on YouTube. The series concerns a character known as the Bunny Boy or Bunny, who makes videos in his secret room and puts them on YouTube. In the videos he asks viewers to help him find his brother Harvey, who went missing on the island of Patmos in Greece. Bunny encourages fans to email him. The Residents' official website later announced that Bunny wished his videos to be removed. Later, they uploaded the first season again via SeeOfSound, so that the advertising money would go towards Bunny's bus ticket to Arkansas. A second season began on 16 February. The series ran for a total of 66 episodes, which were later released on a DVD entitled Is Anybody Out There?.

A comic book The Bunny Boy Comic, illustrated by Adam Weller with a script by The Residents and Bunny, saw a limited release of 199 copies on RalphAmerica in June 2010 and was also sold at the European leg of the Talking Light tour.

A book The Bunny Boy Emails, containing a selection of the emails between Bunny and his fans, picked by Jen Kraynak and Paulie Kraynak of Bandits Mages, was released in 2019 after a crowdfunding campaign.

== Track listing ==
1. "Boxes of Armageddon"
2. "Rabbit Habit"
3. "I'm Not Crazy"
4. "Pictures from a Little Girl"
5. "What If It's True?"
6. "Fever Dreams"
7. "Butcher Shop"
8. "I Like Black"
9. "Secret Room"
10. "My Nigerian Friend"
11. "It Was Me"
12. "Golden Guy"
13. "The Bunny Boy"
14. "Blood on the Bunny"
15. "I Killed Him"
16. "The Dark Man"
17. "Secret Message"
18. "Patmos"
19. "The Black Behind"
