= Demons Dance Alone =

2002 album by the Residents

Studio album by the Residents
- Released: 2002
- Length: 59:24
- Producer: Cryptic Corp.

The Residents chronology
Icky Flix (2001)	Demons Dance Alone (2002)	Animal Lover (2005)

Professional ratings
Review scores
Source	Rating
AllMusic	4/5 stars

Demons Dance Alone DVD

Live album by the Residents
- Released: 2003, 2004
- Recorded: 2002 on tour
- Studio: Mvd Visual
- Length: 95 minutes

Demons Dance Alone is a 2002 concept album (and 2003 DVD) by American art rock group the Residents about the emotional effects of the September 11, 2001, attacks. The album is split into three main parts, "Loss", "Denial", and "The Three Metaphors", bookended by "Tongue" and "Demons Dance Alone", and broken up by various untitled transitional instrumentals.

== CD ==
The CD booklet contains the section "The Residents Have Left The Building", which at first might be taken to indicate that none of the original members are still in the band. It does state that "a few" of those involved are "the flesh and blood residue of our mythical heroes, maintaining appearances for mostly sentimental reasons. But can any of these shadowy sidemen truthfully call themselves THE RESIDENTS? No more than you or I, but if no one claims to be a RESIDENT, doesn't that mean everyone is a potential RESIDENT? Don't we all get their mail?"

Demons Dance Alone was reissued on CD by Cryptic / MVDaudio in 2016 (MVD8235A).

=== CD Track listing ===
1. "Tongue" – 1:11

==== Loss ====
2. "Life Would Be Wonderful" – 3:50
  - Occasionally listed as "Mr. Wonderful"
3. "The Weatherman" – 3:06
4. "Ghost Child" – 2:56
5. "Caring" – 3:50
6. "Honey Bear" – 4:14
7. "The Car Thief" – 3:59
8. "Neediness" – 4:08
9. – 0:25¤
10. "Tongue (Part 2)" 0:44¤
11. – 0:06¤

==== Denial ====
12. "Thundering Skies" – 2:54
13. "Mickey Macaroni" – 2:44
14. "Betty's Body" – 3:31
15. "My Brother Paul" – 3:07
16. – 0:17¤
17. "Baja" – 2:29
18. – 0:27¤
19. "Tongue (Part 3)" 0:32¤
20. – 0:04¤

==== Three Metaphors ====
21. "Beekeeper's Daughter" – 2:53
22. – 0:08¤
23. "Wolverines" – 2:58
24. – 0:04¤
25. "Make Me Moo" – 2:41
26. – 0:35¤
27. "Tongue (Part 4)" 1:03¤
28. "Demons Dance Alone" – 3:43

¤Not listed.

=== Limited Edition Bonus CD ===
1. "Sleepwalker" - 2:55
2. "Hidden Hand (Instrumental)" - 1:44
3. "Black Cats" - 1:18

==== Early Scratch Recordings From Demons Dance Alone ====
4. "Weatherman" - 2:02
5. "Make Me Moo" - 2:15
6. "The Car Thief" - 1:32
7. "The Brother Paul" - 1:25
8. "Caring" - 1:11
9. "Honey Bear" - 1:39
10. "Wolverines" - 1:33
11. "Mickey Macaroni" - 2:03
12. "Demons Dance Alone" - 1:08
13. "Happy Thanksgiving" - 2:22
14. "Hidden Hand (Vocal)" - 2:23
15. "Vampire" - 3:07
16. "Tortured" - 3:12

== Vocals ==
Credited guest artist Molly Harvey plays an expanded role on this album. She leads entirely on "The Weatherman", "Caring", "The Car Thief", and "The Beekeeper's Daughter", as well as partial leads on "Life Would Be Wonderful" and "Ghost Child".

Another notable voice is that of a child, who sings on "Mickey Macaroni" and "Make Me Moo".

Most of the songs are led or partially led by The Residents' main singer, a man with a low, "hard whisper" singing voice.

== DVD ==
A DVD with the same title was released in 2003, consisting of 14 of the tunes from the CD (three versions of "Life Would Be Wonderful"), recorded at various live performances of the Demons Dance Alone tour. The DVD is not a straight concert video, but is structured as an independent stand-alone work, based on the music from the CD, and includes experimental video work, such as the use of infrared cameras.

As is usual for the Residents, the performers are masked and costumed, in this case most in quasi-military clothing. The instrumentalists are garbed in extreme camouflage outfits, and perform behind a camouflage net. Stage action is carried out primarily by the lead singer, and Harvey (also masked and in costume), and by an acrobatic dancer clad in a red body suit, made up as a demon, and wielding two million-candle-power spotlights or, occasionally, a trumpet. The dancer-demon never speaks or sings, but does interact with the other two characters on stage in other ways. The content of the DVD is bracketed at the beginning and the end with musical excerpts from the 1933 film King Kong.

=== DVD Track Listing ===
1. "Betty's Body"
2. "Mickey Macaroni"
3. "Wolverines"
4. "Mr. Wonderful"
5. "Caring"
6. "My Brother Paul"
7. "The Car Thief"
8. "Ms. Wonderful"
9. "Baha" ("Baja")
10. "From The Plains To Mexico"
11. "Golden Goat"
12. "The Shoe Salesman"
13. "Honey Bear"
14. "Life Would Be Wonderful"
15. "Neediness"
16. "Demons Dance Alone"
