= Icky Flix =

Compilation album by the Residents
- Released: 2001

The Residents chronology
Refused (1999)	Icky Flix (2001)	Demons Dance Alone (2002)

Professional ratings
Review scores
Source	Rating
AllMusic	4.5/5 stars
Pitchfork	7.8/10

Icky Flix is a combined DVD and CD set released by American art rock band the Residents as part of their 30th anniversary celebration in 2001. Where the DVD featured the videos and both original and re-recorded versions of the songs, the CD featured a number of the newly recorded highlights.

== DVD Track listing ==
All tracks written and performed by The Residents except "Songs For Swinging Larvae", performed by Renaldo and the Loaf and written by David Janssen and Brian Poole,"It's A Man's Man's Man's World, written by James Brown and Betty Jean Newsome, "We Are The World", written by Michael Jackson and Lionel Richie, and "Stars and Stripes Forever", composed by John Philip Sousa.

1. "The Third Reich 'n' Roll"
2. "Constantinople"
3. "One Minute Movies: Moisture / Act Of Being Polite / Perfect Love / The Simple Song"
4. "Kick a Picnic"
5. "Songs for Swinging Larvae" (re-recorded by The Residents))
6. "He Also Serves"
7. "It's a Man's Man's Man's World"
8. "Harry The Head"
9. "The Gingerbread Man (Concentrate)"
10. "Jelly Jack the Boneless Boy"
11. "Disfigured Night Part 7" (re-recording titled: "Just For You")
12. "Stars and Stripes Forever"
13. "Where is She?"
14. "Burn Baby Burn"
15. "Hello Skinny"
16. "Bad Day on the Midway (Concentrate)"
17. "Vileness Fats: Title"
18. "Vileness Fats: Mom's House"
19. "Vileness Fats: The Cave 1"
20. "Vileness Fats: The Banquet Hall"
21. "Vileness Fats: The Nightclub 1 (Eloise)"
22. "Vileness Fats: The Cave 2"
23. "Vileness Fats: The Nightclub 2"

== CD Track listing ==
All tracks written by The Residents except "Songs For Swinging Larvae", written by David Janssen and Brian Poole, and "Just For You", with lyrics by The Residents and music by Michael Jackson and Lionel Richie.

1. "Icky Flix (Theme)"
2. "The Third Reich 'n' Roll"
3. "Just for You (Disfigured Night, Part 7)"
4. "Songs for Swinging Larvae"
5. "Bad Day on the Midway"
6. "Kick a Picnic"
7. "The Gingerbread Man"
8. "Vileness Fats: Title"
9. "Vileness Fats: Mom's House"
10. "Vileness Fats: The Cave 1"
11. "Vileness Fats: The Banquet Hall"
12. "Vileness Fats: The Nightclub 1 (Eloise)"
13. "Vileness Fats: The Cave 2"
14. "Vileness Fats: The Nightclub 2"
15. "Icky Flix (Closing Theme)"
