= The King & Eye =

Studio album by the Residents
- Released: September 1989
- Genre: Avant-garde, experimental
- Length: 52:27
- Label: Enigma
- Producer: The Residents

The Residents chronology
God in Three Persons (1988)	The King & Eye (1989)	Freak Show (1990)

Singles from The King & Eye
- 1. "Don't Be Cruel" Released: 1990

Professional ratings
Review scores
Source	Rating
AllMusic	2.5/5 stars
Encyclopedia of Popular Music	2/5 stars
The Great Rock Discography	4/10
MusicHound	5/5
NME	8/10
Rolling Stone	4/5 stars
The Rolling Stone Album Guide	2/5 stars
Spin Alternative Record Guide	4/10

The King & Eye is an album by the American art rock band the Residents, released in 1989. It consists of a series of Elvis Presley songs strung together with a narration exploring what motivated him throughout his career. Most of the album showed up in the Cube-E tour. This album was the last full-length album the Residents released before entering their "Multimedia Era."

== Track listing ==
1. "Blue Suede Shoes"
2. "The Baby King Part 1"
3. "Don't Be Cruel"
4. "Heartbreak Hotel"
5. "All Shook Up"
6. "Return to Sender"
7. "The Baby King Part 2"
8. "Teddy Bear"
9. "Devil in Disguise"
10. "Stuck on You"
11. "Big Hunk o' Love"
12. "A Fool Such As I"
13. "The Baby King Part 3"
14. "Little Sister"
15. "His Latest Flame"
16. "Burning Love"
17. "Viva Las Vegas'
18. "The Baby King Part 4"
19. "Love Me Tender"
20. "The Baby King Part 5"
21. "Hound Dog"

== 2004 Remix version ==
A remix version of the album featuring a more heavily synthesised, drum n bass-type sound was released in 2004, consisting of a main album plus a three-track bonus e.p.

=== Track listing (main album) ===
1. "The Baby King 1"
2. "Viva Las Vegas"
3. "Jailhouse Rock"
4. "Surrender"
5. "Devil in Disguise"
6. "Heartbreak Hotel"
7. "Big Hunk o' Love"
8. "Little Sister"
9. "Stuck On You"
10. "Burning Love"
11. "All Shook Up"
12. "Don't Be Cruel"
13. "Don't"
14. "A Fool Such as I"
15. "Can't Help Falling in Love"

=== Track listing (bonus e.p.) ===
1. "Blue Suede Shoes"
2. "Hound Dog"
3. "Teddy Bear"

Omitted from the remix version were "Return to Sender", "His Latest Flame", and "The Baby King" Parts 2–5.
