= Santa Dog EP =

Santa Dog

EP by Residents, Uninc.
- Released: December 20, 1972
- Recorded: 1972
- Genre: Experimental
- Length: 11:09
- Label: Ralph

The Residents chronology
Santa Dog (1972)	Meet the Residents (1974)

Santa Dog is the debut extended play by American experimental rock band the Residents, credited as Residents, Uninc. Released on the Christmas season of 1972, it is one of the Residents' most notorious releases, with the title track (originally published as "Fire") being one of their most well-known songs. Most copies of the EP were sent to close friends, family and celebrity figures such as Frank Zappa and Richard Nixon, the latter refusing his copy.

The music on the EP mostly consists of short percussive pieces, surrealist lyrics and chants, tape loops, and even sampled music (which was not common practice in 1972). Every track is credited to a different fictional artist and songwriter.

The title track went on to become a sort of milestone for the Residents, being re-recorded every couple of years, usually when the group has felt their sound had changed enough. Most of these re-recordings were collected on the group's 1999 compilation, Refused.

The EP was released as a pair of 7" singles presented in a gatefold sleeve designed to look like a Christmas card from an insurance company. One single presented tracks 1 and 4 (sides A and D), while the other presented tracks 2 and 3 (sides B and C). Possibly due to poor supervision, a significant amount of copies were pressed before their varnish finish had dried, resulting in the gatefold sleeves being stuck together.

While the music on Santa Dog was eventually featured on numerous compilations (as well as featured on several reissues of Meet the Residents), the original 1972 EP is today a very rare and valuable collector's item.

== Track listing ==
All songs and lyrics written by the Residents, but credited to the fictional persons listed below.

No.	Title	Writer(s)	Credited artist	Length
1.	"Fire"	Wanda Play	Ivory and the Braineaters	1:43
2.	"Explosion"	Della Gnue	Delta Nudes	2:15
3.	"Lightning"	M. Givens	The College Walkers	3:17
4.	"Aircraft Damage"	B. Barnes / C. America	Arf & Omega (featuring the Singing Lawnchairs)	3:45
Total length:				11:09

=== Samples ===
- "Fire" samples the drums and rhythm guitar portions of "Peter Gunn" performed by the Ventures in the 1967 instructional LP Play Guitar with the Ventures, volume 7.
- "Explosion" samples "Hunters of Heaven" from Harumi's 1968 self-titled album.
- "Lightning" samples a 1961 recording of Amadeo Roldán's Ritmica no. 6.

== Santa Dog '78 ==
Front cover of "Santa Dog '78"

"Santa Dog '78" was recorded in 1978 following a promotional stunt in which the Residents had returned to their San Francisco studio after allegedly having fled to Europe due to label pressures on the release of Eskimo. The single was given away to Ralph mail order customers on Christmas season of 1978. The new recording is similar in structure to the original, but features a throbbing bass synth, horns and cartoonish vocals similar in style to the music on Duck Stab / Buster & Glen.

=== Track listing ===
1. "Santa Dog '78"
2. "Santa Dog" (original 1972 recording mastered at 40RPM)

== Santa Dog '88 ==
Front cover of Santa Dog '88

Santa Dog '88 was released in 1988 and given away to members of UWEB, the official Residents fan club which ran from 1988 to 1993. The CD contained all four versions of "Santa Dog" which had been recorded at the time, although "Santa Dog '84" was never completed, due to dissatisfaction with the recording. Although the track was overdubbed in 1999 for the group's Refused compilation, it was still presented as unfinished. Sections of the track were used in the composition of For Elsie in 1985.

The arrangement of "Santa Dog '88" is much longer and more intricate than other versions of the song, featuring MIDI instruments in the style developed by the group in the late 1980s. The track also borrows elements of "Auld Lang Syne".

No.	Title	Length
1.	"Santa Dog '72 (aka "Fire")"	1:42
2.	"Santa Dog '78"	1:43
3.	"Santa Dog '84 (unfinished)"	2:54
4.	"Santa Dog '88"	5:10
Total length:		11:29

== Santa Dog '92 ==
"Santa Dog '92" was recorded in 1992 and given away to members of UWEB in January 1993, shortly before the fan club was dissolved. It is the longest version of "Santa Dog" released, clocking in at nearly 13 minutes, and is much darker and narrative-driven than every other version of the song, featuring ring-modulated vocals and ambient sounds in a dark, atmospheric backdrop. Melodies and lyrics from the original song are scattered throughout the track, deconstructing it in a manner not unlike what the Residents had done on the Our Finest Flowers album in 1992.

In compilations since, the track has been re-titled "Where Are Your Dogs? Show Us Your Ugly!"

No.	Title	Length
1.	"Santa Dog '92"	12:51

== Other versions ==
- The Residents performed the song as an encore on New Year's Eve 1989 during their Cube E tour. A recording of it was released as "Santa Dog NYE"
- The song was re-recorded as "Fire '99 / Santa Dog in the 2nd Millennium" in 1999 for the Refused compilation. The CD also featured four new tracks inspired by the original song: "Flood", "Famine", "Plague" and "Pestilence". "Fire '99" borrows lyrics from "Aircraft Damage", present on the original 1972 EP
- New recordings of the song were released as free digital downloads on 2006 and 2012. The 2012 version again borrows lyrics from "Aircraft Damage"
- The Residents performed a new version of the song on their Wonder of Weird tour in 2013
- The newest rendition of the song was recorded in 2017, premiered by Sarah Cahill on KALW in August of the same year. The recording was later released as a single by Psychofon Records and given away to subscribers of the Cherry Red Records mailing list

== See also ==
- Refused
