= Chasms Accord =

Studio album by Rhythm & Noise
- Released: 1985
- Genre: Electronic, ambient
- Length: 37:05
- Label: Ralph
- Producer: Frank Harris

Rhythm & Noise chronology
Contents Under Notice (1984)	Chasms Accord (1985)

Chasms Accord is the second and final studio album by experimental ensemble Rhythm & Noise, released in 1985 through Ralph Records.

== Release and reception ==
Professional ratings
Review scores
Source	Rating
Allmusic	2/5 stars

Ted Mill of Allmusic noted that Chasms Accord is mellower than the previous record, saying that this "keyboard-heavy album throbs darkly, but rarely jumps out at you, content instead to muse upon murky, half-completed ideas." Ira Robbins of the Trouser Press described Chasms Accord as being "high on drama and low on intentional ugliness, making it a vivid and apropos match for the stress of modern life" and that it "could serve as the soundtrack to any number of offbeat films."

In 1996, Asphodel Records re-issued the album on CD as a compilation. In addition to various tracks from Chasms Accord, it contains early unreleased compositions and four tracks from Contents Under Notice.

== Track listing ==
All music is composed by Rhythm & Noise.

Frontside Titles
No.	Title	Length
1.	"Lingering Fingers"	1:23
2.	"Filament in Strata"	1:37
3.	"Delirium Tremens"	6:42
4.	"Sequitur"	0:26
5.	"Bent Metal Forest"	4:26
6.	"Schismatic"	2:46

Backside Titles
No.	Title	Length
1.	"Delve"	2:20
2.	"Miasma"	1:36
3.	"Night's Deadly Leaning"	1:03
4.	"Storms Through the Deck"	1:09
5.	"Remembrance"	4:23
6.	"Last Vestige"	4:01
7.	"Andonandon"	5:13

CD Version
No.	Title	Album	Length
1.	"Lingering Fingers"	Chasms Accord	1:25
2.	"Filament in Strata"	Chasms Accord	4:59
3.	"Delirium Tremens"	Chasms Accord	3:00
4.	"Bent Metal Forest"	Chasms Accord	4:08
5.	"Schismatic"	Chasms Accord	4:19
6.	"Delve"	Chasms Accord	2:19
7.	"Current Slaughter"	Excerpt of side 1 of Contents Under Notice	3:30
8.	"Spyral I"	previously unreleased	3:11
9.	"Bilge"	previously unreleased	1:37
10.	"Slug Path"	previously unreleased	7:33
11.	"Alazarn K"	"Vagues" from Contents Under Notice	3:33
12.	"Remembrance"	Remixed version of the song from Chasms Accord	4:28
13.	"Cellar M"	previously unreleased	7:18
14.	"Lull"	Remixed version of the song from Contents Under Notice	4:42
15.	"Monomonon"	Remixed version of the song from Contents Under Notice	9:17
16.	"Pluramin"	previously unreleased	3:29
17.	"Without Your Eye"	previously unreleased	4:03

== Personnel ==
Adapted from the Chasms Accord liner notes.

Rhythm & Noise

- Naut Humon – sampler, vocals, illustrations
- Rex Probe – guitar
- Desmond Shea – percussion, keyboards, engineering
- Z'EV – sampler, drum machine

Additional musicians

- Alaric – Moog synthesizer, castanets, keyboards, drums, engineering
- Michael Belfer – guitar (A6)
- Diamanda Galás – vocals
- Paul Hagain – backing vocals, slit drum

Production and additional personnel

- Roger Bayless – illustrations, art direction
- Frank Harris – production
- Polyploid Sam – photography

== Release history ==
Region	Date	Label	Format	Catalog
United States	1984	Ralph	LP	RN 8555
United States	1989	Asphodel	CD	ASPHODEL 0965
