= Residue of the Residents =

Compilation album by The Residents
- Released: 1983
- Recorded: 1971–1982
- Length: 38:22
- Producer: The Residents

The Residents chronology
The Mole Show (1983)	Residue of the Residents (1983)	Assorted Secrets (1984)

Professional ratings
Review scores
Source	Rating
Allmusic	3/5 stars

Residue of the Residents is an outtakes compilation released by American art rock group The Residents in 1983, collecting miscellaneous recordings from the band's career from 1971 to 1983.

== Track listing ==
All tracks are written by The Residents, except where noted.

Side one
No.	Title	Length
1.	"The Sleeper"	2:57
2.	"Whoopy Snorp"	3:44
3.	"Kamakazi Lady"	1:39
4.	"Boy in Love"	2:56
5.	"Shut Up! Shut Up!"	1:11
6.	"Anvil Forest"	2:21
7.	"Diskomo"	4:32

Side two
No.	Title	Writer(s)	Length
8.	"Jailhouse Rock"	Jerry Leiber / Mike Stoller	3:07
9.	"Ups & Downs"		3:04
10.	"Walter Westinghouse"		8:05
11.	"Saint Nix"		2:30
12.	"Open Up"		2:16
Total length:			38:22

- Track 2 was originally released on the 1977 various artists compilation Blorp Esette.
- Track 4 is an outtake from the Commercial Album sessions in 1979.
- Track 5 is an alternate mix of the Commercial Single track.
- Tracks 6 and 12 are outtakes from The Tunes of Two Cities.
- Track 7 is a remix of the 1980 Diskomo single.
- Track 9 is an early version of the Commercial Album track.
- Track 10 was originally released on the 1977 EP Babyfingers, and is included on most CD reissues of Fingerprince.
- Track 11 was originally recorded in 1974 but overdubbed for inclusion on the album.

== Residue Deux ==
An updated edition of the album was released in 1998 and titled Residue Deux.

No.	Title	Writer(s)	Length
1.	"The Sleeper"		2:57
2.	"Whoopy Snorp"		3:44
3.	"Kamakazi Lady"		1:39
4.	"Boy in Love"		2:56
5.	"Shut Up! Shut Up!"		1:11
6.	"Anvil Forest"		2:21
7.	"Diskomo"		4:32
8.	"Jailhouse Rock"	Jerry Leiber / Mike Stoller	3:07
9.	"Ups and Downs"		3:04
10.	"Scent of Mint"		2:25
11.	"Saint Nix"		2:30
12.	"Open Up"		2:16
13.	"From the Plains to Mexico"		3:27
14.	"The Replacement: In San Francisco"	George Cory (uncredited)	2:03
15.	"The Replacement: Dumbo the Clown"		2:08
16.	"The Replacement: Is He Really Bringing Roses?"		2:35
17.	"The Replacement: Time's Up"		2:55
18.	"Daydream Believer"	John Stewart	2:57
19.	"Safety is a Cootie Wootie, part 1: Prelude for a Toddler"		3:40
20.	"Safety is a Cootie Wootie, part 2: Toddler's Lullaby"		2:38
21.	"Safety is a Cootie Wootie, part 3: Safety is a Cootie Wootie"		4:03
22.	"Daydream in Space"		5:14
Total length:			1:04:30

- Track 8, "Jailhouse Rock", is a different version, recorded in 1986 as a single.
- Track 10, "Scent of Mint", another outtake from The Tunes of Two Cities, replaces "Walter Westinghouse".
- Track 13, "From the Plains to Mexico", was originally released in 1989 as a single in Italy with the Residents' book An Almost Complete Collection of Lyrics: 1972 to 1988.
- Tracks 14–17 were originally released on the 1979 Ralph Records sampler Subterranean Modern. The album also contained music from Chrome, MX-80 and Tuxedomoon.
- Tracks 18 and 22, "Daydream Believer" and "Daydream in Space", were originally released on the 1991 fan club compilation Daydream B-Liver.
- Tracks 19–21 were originally released as bonus tracks on the 1988 CD edition of The Big Bubble.

=== 2014 Superior Viaduct reissue ===
Side one
No.	Title	Length
1.	"The Sleeper"	2:57
2.	"Whoopy Snorp"	3:44
3.	"Kamakazi Lady"	1:39
4.	"Boy in Love"	2:56
5.	"Shut Up! Shut Up!"	1:11
6.	"Anvil Forest"	2:21
7.	"Diskomo"	4:32

Side two
No.	Title	Writer(s)	Length
8.	"Jailhouse Rock"	Jerry Leiber / Mike Stoller	3:07
9.	"Ups and Downs"		3:04
10.	"Walter Westinghouse"		8:05
11.	"Scent of Mint"		2:25
12.	"Saint Nix"		2:30
13.	"Open Up"		2:16
14.	"From the Plains to Mexico"		3:27

Side three
No.	Title	Writer(s)	Length
14.	"Loser ≅ Weed"		2:14
15.	"Death in Barstow"		2:03
16.	"Melon Collie Lassie"		2:53
17.	"The Replacement: In San Francisco"	George Cory (uncredited)	2:03
18.	"The Replacement: Dumbo the Clown"		2:08
19.	"The Replacement: Is He Really Bringing Roses?"		2:35
20.	"The Replacement: Time's Up"		2:55

Side four
No.	Title	Writer(s)	Length
21.	"Daydream Believer"	John Stewart	2:57
22.	"Safety is a Cootie Wootie, part 1: Prelude for a Toddler"		3:40
23.	"Safety is a Cootie Wootie, part 2: Toddler's Lullaby"		2:38
24.	"Safety is a Cootie Wootie, part 3: Safety is a Cootie Wootie"		4:03
25.	"Daydream in Space"		5:14
Total length:			1:19:45

- Track 14, "Loser ≅ Weed", was originally released in 1976 as the B-side to the "Satisfaction" single.
- Tracks 15 and 16, "Death in Barstow" and "Melon Collie Lassie", are tracks from Babyfingers.
