= Hardy Fox =

American musician (1945–2018)

- Also known as: Charles Bobuck
- Born: Hardy Winfred Fox, Jr. March 29, 1945; Longview, Texas, U.S.
- Died: October 30, 2018 (aged 73) San Anselmo, California, U.S.
- Genres: Experimental rock; avant-garde
- Occupations: Musician, songwriter
- Years active: 1969–2018
- Label: Klanggalerie

Hardy Winfred Fox, Jr. (March 29, 1945 – October 30, 2018) was an American musician. He was the co-founder of musical group the Residents, as well as their primary composer. From 1982 to 2016, he was the president of the Cryptic Corporation. During his 44 years with the Residents, and after leaving the band in 2016, he recorded as a solo artist under many names, including Charles Bobuck, Combo de Mechanico, Sonido de la Noche, and Black Tar. His newer solo albums were published by Austrian record label Klanggalerie.

== History ==
=== Early life ===
Hardy Winfred Fox Jr. was born on March 29, 1945, in Longview, Texas. His parents, Hardy Winfred Fox Sr. and Lillian Idell Fox, were Baptist and Methodist Christians, respectively, and so he was raised Protestant. Fox was emotionally distant from his father and took after his mother, who his future husband described as "a creative, poetic soul" who "understood him better than his father and his sisters."

He developed an interest in music at the age of 6, after hearing selections from his grandfather's jazz 78 collection. It was through this collection that he was exposed to Stan Kenton's "Artistry in Tango", as well as the music of Jimmie Lunceford and the Dorsey Brothers. His earliest experiences with playing music came from describing his nightmares to his mother by bashing on a piano, and talking in strange voices. For part of his childhood Fox's father became a missionary, and moved the family to the Southern Philippines, where a young Fox was exposed to Kulintang music, a style he would imitate for his entire career. The family later returned to Texas after his father 'lost his faith'.

Fox graduated from Rayville High School in 1963, and at the age of 18, enrolled in Louisiana Tech University, where he became roommates with later Cryptic Corporation member Homer Flynn. The two bonded over their shared musical interests, and became fast friends. They graduated four years later with a major in art and a minor in business.

=== Pre-Residents (1969–1972) ===
In 1969, Fox and Flynn moved to San Mateo, California. That same year, they began to record themselves performing strange music on a high-end two-track tape recorder that Fox had been given by a Vietnam veteran. In early 1971, Fox, now joined by other collaborators, anonymously submitted a demo tape to Harve Halverstadt at Warner Bros. Records with the hopes of being signed by the label. They received a rejection letter addressed to "The Residents", which inspired the group to name themselves Residents Unincorporated. During this period, Fox began making his first live appearances alongside Residents, Uninc., which now included Snakefinger. The first of these performances was at The Boarding House on October 18th, 1971, followed by two shows at private venues on October 31st and February 12th, 1972. By December of that year Fox, along with the rest of Residents Uninc moved into a warehouse at 20 Sycamore Street in San Francisco, where they set up their first recording studio. That same year, the group formed Ralph Records, and released the Santa Dog EP, featuring four songs by Residents, Uninc. under various pseudonyms.

=== The Residents (1973–2015) ===
In February 1973, the group started recording Ralph Records' debut LP, Meet the Residents. According to Fox, there were no Residents before then, only a loosely bonded friendship of a few people who liked to record together. The group's first LP only sold 40 copies within its first year of release.

In 1976, Fox and Flynn, with Louisiana natives John Kennedy and Jay Clem, formed The Cryptic Corporation, an organisation intended to deal with the business side of Ralph Records and the Residents. The Cryptic Corporation bought the Residents their first synthesizer, an ARP Odyssey for $1,200 ($5,563 in 2021 money). Fox last used the Odyssey in 2008, eventually gifting it to composer Ego Plum in June 2018.

With the release of the group's third LP, Fingerprince, they received attention from the music press when a favorable review of the group's first three LPs appeared in British music magazine Sounds. With their sudden and unexpected success, the group moved into a new studio at 444 Grove Street, San Francisco, where they would record until 1983, when John Kennedy, who owned the studio, retired as president of the Cryptic Corporation. Upon Kennedy's retirement, Fox became President of the Cryptic Corporation, a role he retained until 2016.

=== Self-identification and early solo works (1985–2002) ===
In December 1985, while the Residents were on their 13th Anniversary Tour, Fox's eyeball mask, which had been constructed for the cover of their 1979 album Eskimo, was stolen from backstage. The group decided to replace it with a skull mask, which had previously been a prop for Vileness Fats, and Third Reich 'n Roll promotional material. Because of the specific headgear, the group began to internally refer to Fox as "Dead Eye Dick", and by 1989, Mr. Skull. This was the earliest known decision which differentiated Fox from the other Residents, with his skull mask standing against the other members' eyeballs. In 1997, Fox used the alias 'Max Steinway' on the Residents' 1997 Pollex Christi EP, where he was the credited pianist. By 1999, the mantle of Mr. Skull was taken up by the singing Resident, and Fox regained his unity with the other eyeballed Residents.

From 1999 to 2013, The Residents released at least three singles, which were later attributed as Fox solo works upon re-releases, these included "In Between Screams" (1999), "Dog Tag" (2009), and "Halloween" (2013). These albums were later re-attributed to Fox's Charles Bobuck pseudonym when Fox opened on his own Bandcamp page.

During the 2001 Icky Flix tour, Fox began recording a solo EP, High Horses, inspired by an acid trip he had taken 31 years prior. The EP was released under the name 'Combo de Mecanico' and became Fox's first release outside of the Residents, although the identity of Combo de Mecanico remained unknown at the time. In 2002, Fox recorded his first album worth of solo material, a 30-minute suite entitled Maxine, which was released under the Bobuck name in 2012. In 2002, due to fatigue from touring, Fox had Eric Drew Feldman temporarily replace him as keyboardist on the Demons Dance Alone tour.

=== Charles Bobuck (2010–2016) ===
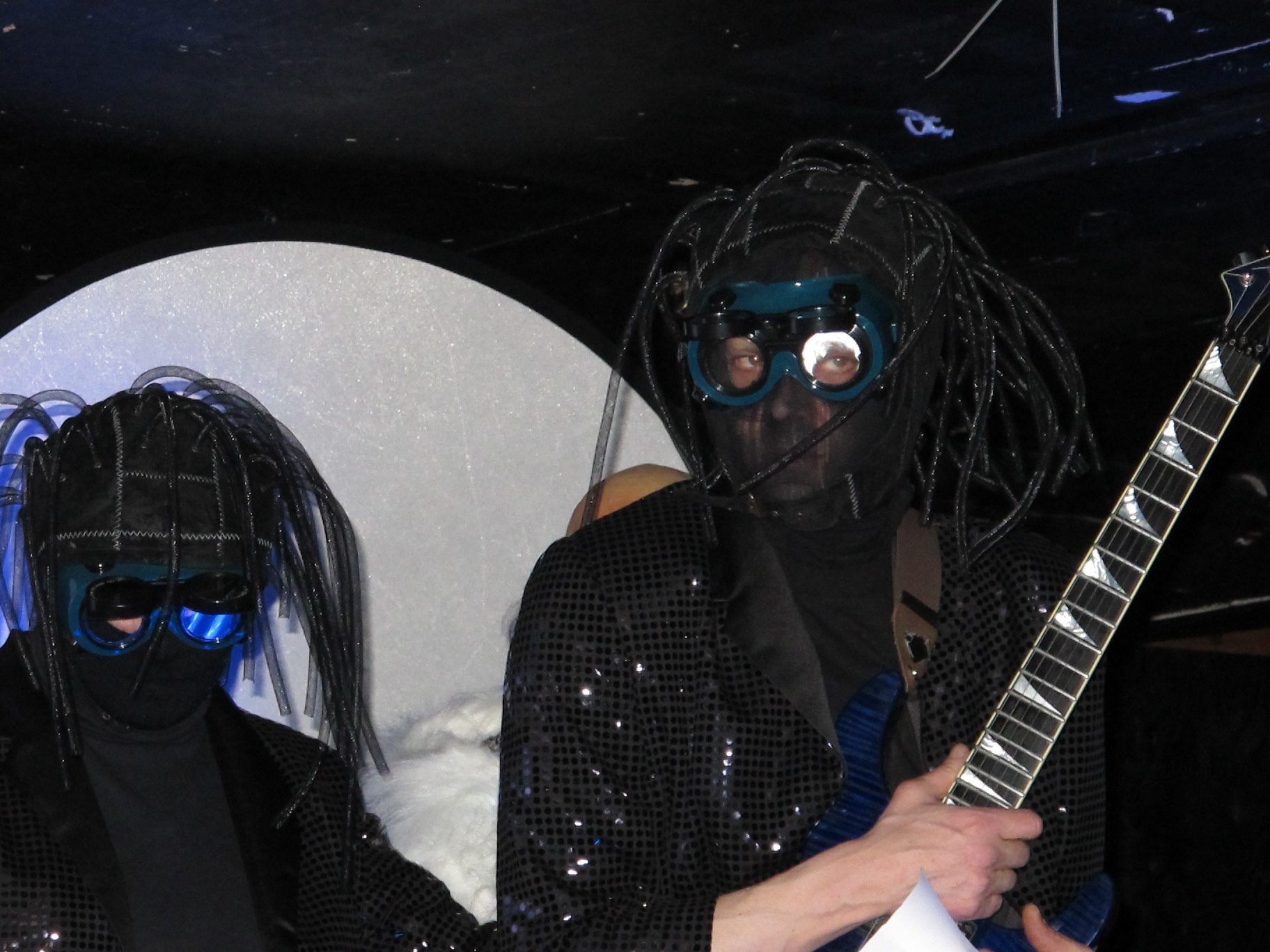
Hardy Fox as Chuck (Left) with Bob (Right), 2010

==== Talking Light (2010–2012) ====
For the 2010 Talking Light tour, the Residents each undertook unique on-stage characters: the singer became Randy Rose; the guitarist, Bob; and Hardy Fox, Charles 'Chuck' Bobuck. These new identities allowed the Residents to pursue solo works in a way previously un-thought of, with Fox and Bob releasing an album Coochie Brake, under the name Sonidos de la Noche in 2011, featuring entirely Spanish vocals. One year later, Fox, under the Bobuck name, released his first solo album, GOD-O: Music for a Gallery Opening, through the Residents' digital store. Throughout the year, Bobuck released three more digital albums, as well as self-releasing his first CD, Codgers On The Moon.

As a companion piece to Codgers On The Moon, Fox published a website of the same name. The website acted as an 18-page memoir of sorts, providing background on 'Bobuck' which had previously been unknown, such his youth and equipment. Fox would continue to create new websites for his major releases, each acting as both context for the album and additions to his memoir.

==== The Wonder of Weird (2013) ====
The 2013 Wonder of Weird tour saw the Residents re-assume the Randy, Chuck and Bob characters. The dialogue in the show stated that Bobuck lived a chicken farm with his husband, something true of Bobuck and Fox. Towards the end of the tour, Fox began to experience arthritis. After surgery did not ameliorate the situation, Fox decided that the next tour would be his last. In 2013 he self-released his second CD album, Life Is My Only Sunshine.

==== Shadowland (2014–2015) ====
The Shadowland tour began on May 2, 2014, with only seven shows planned. Fox wanted the show to represent the death of Randy, Chuck and Bob, and the rebirth of the Residents as a truly nameless band, bringing with it a drastic new direction of sound. However, designing such a drastically different sound proved too demanding on Fox, and so a show celebrating the Residents' past was instead created. The group also wished to record a new album immediately following the mini-tour; however, this was scrapped in favor of further tour dates.

On October 7th, 2014, MVD Audio released the Roman De La Rose album, with Bobuck's retirement from The Residents following in March of 2015. He was replaced by Eric Drew Feldman. Fox stepped down from his position at The Cryptic Corporation in 2016.

=== Post-Residents (2015–2018) ===
After leaving The Residents, Fox signed a multi-album deal with Austrian record label Klanggalerie, who released his What Was Left Of Grandpa album on October 1st, 2015, followed by The Swords Of Slidell and Bobuck Plays The Residents, the following year.

Shortly after Bobuck Plays The Residents, Fox began to publish a bi-monthly email newsletter titled Hacienda Bridge, credited to Hardy Fox and Charles Bobuck. From March 1, 2017, issue, the newsletters began featuring The Stone, a serialized novella, the final chapter of which revealed that Fox and Bobuck were one and the same. Following this newsletter, the Bobuck character was retired and Fox began releasing music under his own name. The final Bobuck album was Nineteen-Sixty-Seven, in 2017.

Fox remained signed to Klanggalerie even after his rebranding, and, in 2018, released a collaborative album with Fred Frith, a self titled solo album, and, Rilla Contemplates Love, his final album. Klanggalerie have also released several posthumous albums by Fox.

== Personal life ==
Fox's ex-wife, Nessie Lessons, frequently appeared on Residents recordings from 1980 to 1983. They divorced c. 1983, when Hardy met Steven Kloman. Hardy married Kloman in 2008. He had two sisters, Diane Pasel and Linda Perez.

== Illness and death ==
In September 2018, Fox was diagnosed with glioblastoma. He announced that he was unwell and had "something in his brain," and later added an assumed death date to his website. On October 30 2018, he died of assisted suicide at his home in San Anselmo, California.

== Studio album discography ==
With the Residents

Hardy Fox performed on Residents recordings from 1972's Santa Dog to 2015's Shadow Stories, with his final writing for the group appearing on 2017's The Ghost of Hope.

=== Solo Albums ===
As Charles Bobuck

- Codgers On The Moon (2012) (Self released)
- Life Is My Only Sunshine (2013) (Self released)
- The Highway (2014) (Self released)
- Roman De La Rose (2014)
- What Was Left Of Grandpa (2015)
- The Swords Of Slidell (2016)
- Bobuck Plays The Residents (2016)
- Nineteen-Sixty-Seven (2017)

As Hardy Fox

- A Day Hanging Dead Between Heaven And Earth (2018) (With Fred Frith)
- Hardy Fox (2018)
- Rilla Contemplates Love (2018)
- Killing Time (2020)
- Ibbur (2022)

==== As 'The Residents' ====
The following are releases credited to The Residents for which Fox later took full credit.

- Pollex Christi EP (1997)
- High Horses EP (2001)
  - EP credited to Combo de Mecanico
- Postcards from Patmos (2008)
- Hades (2009)
- Dollar General (2010)
- Chuck's Ghost Music (2011)
  - Re-released as a Charles Bobuck album in 2012 and 2021
- Mush-Room (2013)

MiniAlbums / EPs
Year	Title	Label	Notes
2016	Black Tar - 13 Tiny Tunes for Hallow's Eve	Bandcamp	MiniAlbum, credited to C. Bobuck / H. Fox
2018	A Day Hanging Dead Between Heaven And Earth	Klanggalerie	MiniAlbum, With Fred Frith
2018	Nachtzug	Klanggalerie	EP, based on sketches that also became The Ghost of Hope by the Residents.
Posthumous
2019	Black Tar and the Cry Babies	Klanggalerie	Compilation

Singles
Year	Title	Label	Notes
2017	Wink	Bandcamp	
2017	Duet	Bandcamp	
2018	Paying The Sun	Bandcamp	
Posthumous
2019	25 Minus Minutes	Klanggalerie	

As Charles Bobuck

Mini Albums/EPs
Year	Title	Label	Notes
2011	Lying Horse Rock	Bandcamp	Expanded album version released on CD
2016	Black Tar - 13 Tiny Tunes for Hallow's Eve	Bandcamp	MiniAlbum, credited to C. Bobuck / H. Fox
2016	Later Tonight	Klanggalerie	EP
2016	Trump	Bandcamp	EP
2017	Clank Clank Clank	Klanggalerie	EP

=== Guest appearances ===
==== As Hardy Fox ====
- The Delta Nudes - Greatest Hiss (1973, released 2013)
- KU01 - Ralph Radio Special (1981) [Interviewee]
- The Residents - Third Reich 'n Roll Hardback Book (2005) [Photography]
- Bob Uck & The Family Truck - Oddities 2013-2015 (2015, released 2020) [Writing, Performance, Production, Artwork]
- The Theory Of Obscurity - A Film About The Residents (2016) [Editorial Consultant]
- Charles Bobuck - The Swords Of Slidell (2016) [Narrator]
- Charles Bobuck - Later Tonight (2016) [Executive Producer]
- Charles Bobuck - Plays The Residents (2016) [Executive Producer]
- Charles Bobuck - Thanksgiving in Bed (2016) [Illustration]
- Charles Bobuck - Nineteen-Sixty-Seven (2016) [Production, Arrangement & Performance]

==== As Charles Bobuck ====
- The Delta Nudes - Greatest Hiss (1973, 2013)
- The Residents Present The Delta Nudes (1973, 2016)
- The Residents - Triple Dub-Ya: The Way We Were Melbourne (2005, 2012) [Remix, Editing]
- The Residents - Lonely Teenager (2011)
- Sonidos De La Noche - Coochie Brake (2011) [Keyboards]
- The Residents - The Rivers of Hades (2011) [Producer]
- Th* R*sidents - D*ck S*ab 35th Anniversary (2012) [Illustration]
- The Residents - Bad Day on the Midway (Music From The Game Reconsidered) (2012) [Contraption]
- The Residents - Mush-Room (2013) [Contraption]
- The Residents - Radio Thoreau Download Series (2013 - 2014) [Fix]
- The Residents - The Wonder of Weird (2014)

==== Under other pseudonyms ====
- The Residents - Pollex Christi EP (1997) [Piano & Production, as Max Steinway]
- Combo de Mecanico - High Horses EP (2001)
- The Residents - Commercial Album DVD (2004) [Interface Design And Blue Movies, as Sami Selmo]
- The Residents – The Rivers Of Hades (2011) [Package Assembly, as Sammi Selmo]
- Sonidos De La Noche - Coochie Brake (2011) [Package Design, as Sammi Selmo]
- Charles Bobuck - Lying Horse Rock (2012) [Package Design, as Sammi Selmo]
- Charles Bobuck - GOD O: Music for a Gallery Opening (2012) [CD Cover & Package, as Sammi Selmo]
- Charles Bobuck – Maxine (2012) [Image, as Sammi Selmo]

== Bibliography ==
=== as Charles Bobuck ===
- (2016) THIS

=== as Hardy Fox ===
- (2017) The Swords of Slidell
- (2017) Wallpaper
- (2017) The Stone
