= Will E. Jackson =

American activist

William E. Jackson
- Born: William Edward Jackson III; February 13, 1945 (age 81); Chicago, Illinois, U.S.
- Education: Canoga Park HS
- Occupations: Author; Ret. Maritime Captain
- Known for: Greenpeace Activist; Author; Musician
- Title: Ret. Captain
- Political party: Social Democrat
- Children: Cory; Ryan; Quinn; Enjoli
- Parent(s): G. William; Marjorie

William Edward Jackson III (born February 13, 1945 - 2019) served with Greenpeace in its early years, as crew member on the first anti-whaling expedition, and as cofounder of Greenpeace San Francisco (the first GP chapter after Vancouver, BC). A pioneer Serge modular synthesizer builder and player.

== Cellar-M (1972-1976) ==
Cellar-M was an experimental collective that came out of California Institute of the Arts, where, in 1972, as a multimedia artist, Will Jackson won a scholarship to, but allegedly lost it when he offended his mentor Allan Kaprow. Cellar-M was co-founded by Will Jackson, Naut Humon and Rex Probe. In 1974 Stefan Weisser (Z'EV) joined the band.

Cellar-M split in 1976 into 2 duets: TO and Rhythm & Noise.

== Serge Modular Music System#1 (1973) ==
In 1973, Will Jackson moved on to Serge Tcherepnin's CalArts synthesizer workshop, under whose supervision he built his own modular synthesizer. He later gave his modular the title of Serge Modular Music System#1 explaining, in his book Once upon a Greenpeace, that "It was in a CalArts workshop that my Serge System syntheser was built, along with eight others. Mine just happened to be the first to make a sound and fly...a year later to land on the deck of the first anti-wahling expedition in history."

== Greenpeace (1975–1977) ==
As an artist, Will Jackson was invited to board the Greenpeace V as part of the media campaign to demonstrate whale intelligence, and to disrupt Russian whaling. Jackson played his Serge Modular Music System#1 that had been brought onboard, broadcast through underwater speakers, with the intention of communicating with whales through synthesized whale song. He was one of six persons out of a rotating pool of 35 to remain aboard throughout the expedition. Bob Hunter, cofounder and first president of Greenpeace, credits Jackson with saving him from drowning at Triangle Island.

Following on the success of that voyage, Jackson opened the San Francisco office of Greenpeace. With the assistance of Fund for Animals (Cleveland Amory, Virginia Handley), eco-filmmaker Stan Minasian, and commercial pilot Al Johnson. Jackson launched a grassroots media campaign, struggling from a South-of-Market condemned hotel to gain volunteers and donations, in preparation for the first anti-sealing expedition, and the follow-up whale expedition of 1976. (Three years after he left, the chapter was embroiled in a lawsuit with Vancouver over a million dollars and rights; the outcome being the formation of today's Greenpeace International). These accounts and others are referenced in Robert Hunter's book, Rex Weyler's Greenpeace (Rodale, 2004), the Hunter-Weyler collaboration To Save A Whale (Chronicle Books, 1978), and The Greenpeace Story (Dorling Kindersley, 1989).

Will Jackson's Greenpeace memoirs, Once upon a Greenpeace was published in 2013 (Infinity).

== TO (1976-1977) ==
In 1976, he co-founded the band TO with experimental percussionist Stefan ''Z'EV'' Weisser, occasionally performing under the name Center for Interspecies Communication.

TO's commitment to developing the world's knowledge and preservation of cetaceans would lead them to hold awareness concerts from California to Japan, performing at the Harumi Dome in Tokyo for the “Save the Seas” event against commercial whaling. During this event, TO went on to record more than 12 hours of live concert music in just two days.

TO released one album in 1976, which was reissued in 2024.

== Ether Ship (1977-1979) ==
After TO ceased its activities, he joined Ether Ship, a pionneer sonic xenolinguisitcs performance art group created in 1972 in Los Angeles by Willard van de Bogart and Lemon DeGeorge, whom he had met at Calarts.

== Reggae years ==
In the 1980s Will Jackson became interviewer/program producer for Miss Wire Waist of KPFK's Sounds of Jamaica (L.A.); and published Jah Guide reggae culture magazine. He recorded, published and broadcast speeches on apartheid by Jesse Jackson, Michael Manley, and Bishop Desmond Tutu; and interviews with Steel Pulse, Burning Spear, Big Youth, Mutabaruka, Ras Michael and Peter Tosh. Meanwhile, he managed a 25-year career as a maritime seaman, union captain, and then fatherhood. In 2003 he authored the "reggae" novel Flight From Babylon (Infinity).

== Bibliography ==
- Will Jackson – Synthesizers on the Eco-Front, Synapse Electronic Music Magazine (March/April 1977)
- Will Jackson – Bridge Over Troubled Waters, Synapse Electronic Music Magazine (Nov/Dec 1977)
- Will Jackson – Flight From Babylon: The Legend of Draxie Dread (Infinity, 2004)
- Will Jackson – Once Upon A Greenpeace (Infinity, 2013)

== Discography ==
- TO – Manifestations Of Spirit From Within Electronic Electro-Acoustic & Acoustic Space (Lp, 1976)
- Z'EV – 1968-1990: One Foot In The Grave (CD, 1993)
- Stefan Weisser – WordWorks 1975-1982 (Cassettes, 2017)
- Ether Ship – E.T.I. Ether Ship Transmission For Star Net Pilot Program (Lp, 2023)

== Filmography ==
- A Cosmic Journey, Gary Schroder (1978)
- How to Change the World, Jerry Rothwell (2015)
- The Ether Ship, Greg Mallozzi (in preparation)
