= The Residents Radio Special =

Radio Special

Studio album by the Residents
- Released: 1977
- Recorded: 1970–1977
- Genre: Rock
- Length: 48:05
- Label: Ralph

The Residents chronology
Fingerprince (1977)	Radio Special (1977)	Not Available (1978)

The Residents Radio Special is a promotional cassette created by Ralph Records in 1977 to promote the Residents' catalogue of 7" singles, Santa Dog, "Satisfaction", The Beatles Play the Residents and the Residents Play the Beatles, and Babyfingers.

This cassette was a promotional item issued to radio stations shortly after the release of Fingerprince. It was soon offered through the mail-order service in limited quantities on cassette. The promotional item was repackaged and sold through the Ralph Records mail-order catalogue in 1983. A limited edition CD, entitled Eat Exuding Oinks!, was released in 2001, featuring the original radio show and the digitally remastered versions of the songs.

== Track list ==
=== Original track list ===
1. Introduction
2. Death in Barstow
3. Interview
4. Beyond the Valley of a Day in the Life
5. Flying
6. Satisfaction
7. Interview
8. Loser $\cong$ Weed
9. Interview
10. Melon Collie Lassie
11. Interview
12. Santa Dog
13. Interview
14. King Kong
15. Interview
16. Kamakazi Lady
17. Whoopy Snorp
18. Interview
19. Walter Westinghouse
20. Credits

=== Eat Exuding Oinks! track list ===
- Ralph Records' 1977 Radio Special
1. Part 1
2. Part 2
3. Part 3
4. Part 4
5. Monstrous Intro
6. Death in Barstow
7. Beyond the Valley of a Day in the Life
8. Flying
9. King Kong
10. Whoopy Snorp
11. Melon Collie Lassie
12. Kamikazi Lady
