= Pollex Christi =

EP by The Residents
- Released: 1997
- Length: ca. 20 minutes
- Label: Ralph America
- Producers: The Cryptic Corporation, Max Steinway

Pollex Christi ("The Thumb of Christ") is the first of Ralph America's limited edition CDs by the Residents. It is thought to be a solo studio project by the band's keyboardist and main composer Hardy Fox. The 20-minute synthesizer piece is made up entirely of quoted material, mostly works by famous German composers, including Beethoven's Fifth Symphony and Orff's Carmina Burana, with a few American television show tunes added in.

The piece was purportedly composed by the friend and collaborator from their early years, N. Senada, and in some ways plays on classical themes the same way their 1976 album, Third Reich and Roll, did with 1960s top-40 music. Two editions were released of 400 copies each, the first issue being hand numbered.

== Track listing ==
1. Part 1
2. Part 2
3. Part 3
4. Part 4
5. Part 5
