= Contents Under Notice =

Studio album by Rhythm & Noise
- Released: 1984
- Genre: Electronic, drone, ambient
- Length: 40:53
- Label: Ralph

Rhythm & Noise chronology
Contents Under Notice (1984)	Chasms Accord (1985)

Contents Under Notice is the debut studio album of experimental ensemble Rhythm & Noise, released in 1984 by Ralph Records.

== Release and reception ==
Professional ratings
Review scores
Source	Rating
Allmusic	2.5/5 stars

Retrospective critical reception of Contents Under Notice has been mixed. Ted Mill of allmusic described the release as a "mixture of wobbly synth beds, industrial noise, scattershot drum machines, eerie whines, and treated vocal samples." He gave it two and a half out of five stars, criticizing it for being too lengthy for its concept. However, Trouser Press offered a more enthusiastic review. Ira Robbins wrote that "in its raucous, multi-layered complexity, the piece asymptotically approaches sheer white noise din" and that "maybe this is what Martians with insomnia listen to."

The album has never been issued on CD.

== Track listing ==
All music is composed by Rhythm & Noise.

Stereo Soundtrack
No.	Title	Length
1.	"Looms"	1:30
2.	"Verge"	2:20
3.	"Lapse"	4:12
4.	"Vex"	2:05
5.	"Lull"	11:34

Mono Effects
No.	Title	Length
1.	"Vagues"	3:29
2.	"Monomenon"	15:43

== Personnel ==
Adapted from the Contents Under Notice liner notes.

Rhythm & Noise

- Naut Humon – sampler
- Rex Probe – sampler, percussion
- Z'EV – extended drum set (Rax Werx), percussion

Additional musicians and production

- Diamanda Galás – vocals

== Release history ==
Region	Date	Label	Format	Catalog
United States	1984	Ralph	LP	RN8405
United States	1989	Ralph	LP	RN8405
