= Ether Ship =

Ether Ship (originally known as The Electric Symphony until 1976) is a pioneer sonic xenolinguistics performance art group created in 1972 in Los Angeles by Willard van de Bogart and Lemon DeGeorge.

== History ==
Willard van De Bogart and Lemon DeGeorge met in California Institute of the Arts at the temporary campus of Villa Cabrini, in Burbank, California. There they conducted various experiments in collaboration with other artists and media visionaries and worked alongside Nam June Paik, Allan Kaprow, Morton Subotnick, Gene Youngblood, Serge Tcherepnin, Sharon Grace, Naut Humon, et al.

Their first public performance (with Walter Steding) was in 1972 at the 9th Annual Avant Garde Festival of New York created by Charlotte Moorman.

After several performances on the east coast, the group relocated in the San Francisco Bay area in 1976 and gave his first concert at the Esalen Institute under the name Ether Ship.

Ether Ship protocols were deeply influenced by Willard van de Bogart works done with the philosopher Oliver L. Reiser and sculptor Nicolas Schöffer.

During his 70's performances, Willard van de Bogart directed different sound, light and exotic devices (lasers, psychotronic devices, brainwave analyzer, magnets, etc.) interconnected with feedback interacting, surrounded by musicians. Jacques Vallée, who attended one of their 1978 performances, wrote in his book, Forbidden Science - Volume Two, that Willard van De Bogart was "visualized higher entities while playing".

In 1982, Willard van de Bogart And Lemon DeGeorge created a production company, Ether Ship Productions, which released only one record Trans-Millenia Consort by Pauline Anna Strom.

Since early 2000, Willard Van De Bogart lives in Thailand. He taught at universities and was researching obscure spiritual sites.

Lemon DeGeorge has operated a sound studio in San Francisco for thirty years, and performs all over the world with a musical trio. In 1999, he participated in the film Genghis Blues.

== Members ==
The musicians who have been part of Ether Ship in the 70' period are Liz Bryant, Lemon DeGeorge, Will Jackson, Dave Korman, Selwyn Lissack, Larry Lauterborn, Bob McNulty, Tom McVeety, Henry Niese, Gary Schroder, Walter Steding, Willard van de Bogart, Z'ev.

Today, Lemon DeGeorge & Willard van de Bogart continues to make performances, primarily in sacred natural sites.

== Group name and logo ==
The group name came from the book The Cosmic Pulse of Life by Trevor James Constable.

The logo is a double magnet.

== International Extraterrestrial Electronic Music Consortium (IEEMC) ==
In 2022, Willard van De Bogart created the IEEMC which "main objective is to create sonic xenolinguistic expressions whereby tele-factoring channels of communication from extraterrestrials are embedded in the production of sound."

== Discography ==
- Xenolinguistic Sonic Expressions (CD, 2013)
- Quantum Waves (CD, 2014)
- E.T.I. Ether Ship Transmission For Star Net Pilot Program (Vinyl, 2023)

== Bibliography ==
- Willard van de Bogart - Alien Child (2020)
- Willard van de Bogart - Other: First Contact & Personal disclosure (2022)

== Filmography ==
- A Cosmic Journey, Gary Schroder (1978)
- The Ether Ship, Greg Mallozzi (in preparation)
