= The Mole Show Live at the Roxy =

The Mole Show

Live album by the Residents
- Released: 1983
- Recorded: October 30, 1982
- Venues: The Roxy Theatre, Los Angeles
- Label: Ralph
- Producer: The Cryptic Corporation

The Residents chronology
The Tunes of Two Cities (1982)	The Mole Show (1983)	Residue of the Residents (1983)

The Mole Show Live at the Roxy is the first live album by American art rock group the Residents. The show was originally bootlegged, and The Cryptic Corporation bought the master tapes, releasing it officially on Ralph Records in 1983. 1800 copies were pressed on black vinyl, and a picture disc edition of 1500 copies was also released. The album was released in 1998 by Bomba Records in Japan.

Further live albums from the Mole Show tour include Assorted Secrets (With its second side entirely made up of studio rehearsals) and The Mole Show Live in Holland.

== Track listing ==
Tracks 3, 5, 7, 10, 12 and 15 are narration interludes by Penn Jillette.

All tracks are written by The Residents except where noted.

No.	Title	Writer(s)	Length
1.	"Voices of the Air"		3:07
2.	"The Secret Seed"		1:58
3.	"Welcome..."		0:50
4.	"The Ultimate Disaster"		4:46
5.	"Rather flashy..."		0:13
6.	"God of Darkness"		2:34
7.	"Mole style..."		0:18
8.	"Migration"		8:15
9.	"Another Land"		3:20
10.	"That's all we need..."		0:21
11.	"The New Machine"		6:25
12.	"A real complicated ending..."		0:32
13.	"The Song of the Wild"		3:03
14.	"Final Confrontation"		6:47
15.	"We had to borrow money from our parents..."		1:40
16.	"Satisfaction"	Mick Jagger / Keith Richards	2:10
17.	"Happy Home"		3:19

== Personnel ==
- The Residents – performance
- Nessie Lessons – vocals on "Happy Home"
- Penn Jillette – narration
- Scott Fraser – sound
