= Six More Miles (To the Graveyard) =

Single by Hank Williams With His Drifting Cowboys
- A-side: "I Saw the Light"
- Published: November 30, 1948 Acuff-Rose Publications
- Released: September 1948
- Recorded: April 21, 1947
- Studio: Castle Studio, Nashville
- Genre: Gothic country, Hillbilly, Honky-tonk, Country blues, gospel
- Length: 2:45
- Label: MGM
- Songwriter: Hank Williams
- Producer: Fred Rose

Hank Williams With His Drifting Cowboys singles chronology
"I'm a Long Gone Daddy" (1948)	"Six More Miles (To the Graveyard)" (1948)	"A Mansion on the Hill" (1948)

Six More Miles (To the Graveyard) is a song written by Hank Williams for MGM Records. It appeared as the B-side to "I Saw the Light" in 1948.

== Background ==
"Six More Miles (To the Graveyard)" was one of the earliest songs Hank Williams published as a songwriter; it was one of several compositions that appeared in his self-published song folios in 1945 and 1946. The original version contained a verse not heard in Hank's version: "Left her in that lonely church yard, left my darlin' alone/Now I'm sad, my heart is cryin', as I wander through life alone." Although Williams recorded the song in April 1947, it did not surface until it appeared as the B-side to "I Saw the Light" in September 1948. While the A-side celebrated the joys of salvation, the B-side was its opposite in just about every respect, describing the despairing thoughts of a man who is making his way to the graveyard to bury his deceased lover. Despite the song's dark subject matter, it did share "I Saw the Light's" swift tempo and is also a prime example of how Williams and producer Fred Rose used the slap of the guitars to create the driving percussive sound that was a trademark of honky tonk music. Williams recorded the song during his first session with MGM on April 21, 1947. The band was composed by part of Red Foley's backing, including Zeke and Zeb Turner (guitar), Brownie Raynolds (bass), Tommy Jackson (fiddle) and Smokey Lohman (steel guitar).

== Cover versions ==
- Molly O'Day recorded the song, one of the earliest covers of a Hank Williams song.
- The song appears on Ralph Stanley and the Clinch Mountain Boys' 1971 album Something Old, Something New.
- The Residents covered the song multiple times, recording it for their 1986 album Stars and Hank Forever, their 1988 Snakefinger tribute album Snakey Wake, and their 2011 album Lonely Teenager. Už Jsme Doma performed the song with Randy Rose, a persona of The Residents' singer, on the 2020 live album Moravian Meeting, recorded in 2010.
- Camper Van Beethoven recorded a cover version of the song during the original active period of the band in the 1980s. It was released on their 1993 rarities compilation Camper Vantiquities.
- Mike Ness recorded the song for his second solo album.

== Bibliography ==
- Escott, Colin; Merritt, George; MacEwen, William (1994). Hank Williams: The Biography. New York: Little, Brown. ISBN 9780316249386.
- Escott, Colin; Merritt, George; MacEwen, William (2004). Hank Williams: The Biography. New York: Little, Brown.
