= Greener Postures =

Studio album by Snakefinger
- Released: October 1980
- Genre: Experimental rock, Art Rock
- Length: 38:19
- Label: Ralph Records
- Producer: Snakefinger & the Residents

Snakefinger chronology
Chewing Hides the Sound (1979)	Greener Postures (1980)	Manual of Errors (1982)

Singles from Greener Postures
- 1. "The Man in the Dark Sedan" Released: 1980

Professional ratings
Review scores
Source	Rating
Allmusic	3/5 stars

Greener Postures was Snakefinger's second full-length album, released by Ralph Records in 1980. The record is co-produced with the Residents, who also co-wrote many of the songs.

== Track listing ==
All tracks are written by Snakefinger & the Residents except where noted.

Side One
No.	Title	Writer(s)	Length
1.	"Golden Goat"		4:11
2.	"Don't Lie" (Featuring Blaine L. Reininger)		3:34
3.	"The Man in the Dark Sedan"		4:38
4.	"I Come from an Island"	Snakefinger	3:24
5.	"Jungle Princess"		3:49
Total length:			19:36

Side Two
No.	Title	Writer(s)	Length
6.	"Trashing All the Loves of History"	Snakefinger	3:13
7.	"Save Me from Dali"		2:34
8.	"Living in Vain"		3:46
9.	"The Picture Makers Vs. Children of the Sea"		9:30
Total length:			19:03

=== KlangGalerie 2018 Bonus Tracks ===
Live in Melbourne 1981
No.	Title	Writer(s)	Length
10.	"Smelly Tongues" (Live 1981)	The Residents	02:31
11.	"I Love Mary" (Live 1981)	Trad. arr. Snakefinger	02:12
12.	"Picnic in the Jungle" (Live 1981)		03:33
13.	"Jinx" (Live 1981)	Steven Brown, Peter Dachert, Blaine L. Reininger, Winston Tong	03:18
14.	"Kill the Great Raven" (Live 1981)		02:15
15.	"Who Is the Culprit and Who Is the Victim?" (Live 1981)		02:37
16.	"Jesus Was a Leprechaun (Live 1981)"		01:42
17.	"What Wilbur?" (Live 1981)		02:50
18.	"The Spot" (Live 1981)		02:43

=== KlangGalerie 2025 Bonus Tracks ===
No.	Title	Writer(s)	Length
19.	"Golden Goat" (Remix)		4:08
20.	"Living in Vain" (Remix)	Snakefinger	3:27
21.	"I Come from an Island" (Remix)		3:31
22.	"Jungle Princess" (Remix)		2:02
23.	"Untitled"		2:00
24.	"Trashing All the Loves of History" (Remix)	Snakefinger	3:14
25.	"The Picture Makers Vs. Children of the Sea" (Remix)		5:36
26.	"Womb to Worm" (Remix)		1:36

== Personnel ==
- Produced by Snakefinger and the Residents
- Violin solo on "Don't Lie" by Blaine L. Reininger
