= The Warner Bros. Album =

Demo album by The Residents
- Released: 21 April 2018
- Recorded: 1970–1971
- Genre: Avant-garde
- Length: 38:57
- Label: New Ralph Too, Cherry Red, MVD Audio
- Producer: The Residents

The Residents chronology
Rusty Coathangers For The Doctor (1970)	The Warner Bros. Album (2018)	B.S. (2019)

2018 pREServed edition

The Warner Bros. Album is a demo tape by the unnamed avant-garde group who would later become known as The Residents, recorded in 1970 and 1971, but not officially released until 2018 as a Record Store Day limited edition vinyl release.

== History ==
One of the group's earliest known recordings, The Warner Bros. Album was compiled as a demo reel to showcase their talents, and was sent anonymously to Hal Halverstadt, the executive who signed Captain Beefheart and his Magic Band to Warner Bros. Records. The group had hoped that Halverstadt would appreciate their earnest experiments and, ideally, offer them a budget and a major label platform. Halverstadt was not overly impressed with the tape, describing it as "okay at best", but awarded it an "A for Ariginality". The tape was returned, and addressed to "Residents, 20 Sycamore St., San Francisco," which led the group to briefly take the name Residents Unincorporated, and then later The Residents.

The existence of several early recordings would be hinted at in Ralph Records publications and The Residents' own album liner notes throughout the 1970s. The Warner Bros. Album and Baby Sex were both broadcast to the public in their entirety on KBOO-FM radio in Portland, Oregon, during a Residents radio festival in 1977. For many years afterwards, both albums circulated among fans and eventually on the internet, having been sourced from home recordings of this broadcast.

In 2004, a remix album, WB: RMX, was released by The Cryptic Corporation as a response to the bootleg recordings of the tape were already being circulated on the Internet. It featured radically remixed versions of a number of the songs from the original tape, with a more modern production style and little resemblance to the original recordings.

== Release ==
Edited excerpts from the original tape would become officially available for the first time on the ERA B474 and The Delta Nudes' Greatest Hiss compilation albums in 2012 and 2013. These albums also included previously unheard alternative takes of "Sweet Meat" (under the name "Goodbye Lover") and "Maggie's Farm".

The demo was finally released in a new remaster of its original unedited mix on Record Store Day in April 2018. Issued under the name The W***** B*** Album as a special entry in The Residents' pREServed series of re-issues, the album was available in a limited pressing of 900 copies. In 2019, Cherry Red Records released a double-CD anthology, A Nickle If Your Dick’s This Big (1971-1972), which included both The W***** B*** Album and B.S. in their entirety, remastered from the original tapes.

== Track listing ==
All songs written and composed by The Pre-Residents, except where noted.

Side one
No.	Title	Length
1.	"Strawberry Fields Forever" (Lennon/McCartney)	0:27
2.	"The Mad Sawmill of Copenhagen, Germany"	1:08
3.	"Baby Skeletons and Dogs"	1:28
4.	"Bop Bop Shu Bop Bop"	0:38
5.	"Stuffed Genital"	0:27
6.	"Christmas Morning Foto"	0:06
7.	"Every Day I Masturbate On A Merican Fag"	1:15
8.	"Oh Mommy Oh Daddy Can't You See That It's True"	0:51
9.	"Baby Skeletons and Dogs #2"	1:52
10.	"The Mad Sawmill of Copenhagen, Germany"	0:28
11.	"Going To Arcata Blues"	1:56
12.	"The Mad Sawmill of Copenhagen, Germany"	0:06
13.	"Black Velvet Original"	0:13
14.	"The Mad Sawmill of Copenhagen, Germany"	0:08
15.	"Jimi Hendrix Dildo"	0:39
16.	"The Mad Sawmill of Copenhagen, Germany"	2:01
17.	"In The Still of the Night"	0:19
18.	"Maggie's Farm" (Dylan)	1:23
19.	"The Mad Sawmill of Copenhagen, Germany"	0:02
20.	"Snot and Feces Live at the Grunt Festival"	0:49
21.	"Sweet Meat"	2:29

Side two
No.	Title	Length
1.	"Oh Yea Uhh Bop Shu Bop"	0:45
2.	"Om Is Where The Art Is"	3:03
3.	"Concerto in R Flat Minor"	1:23
4.	"Gagagapiggaeoupe"	0:38
5.	"Sold American"	0:39
6.	"Love Theme From A Major Motion Picture"	0:38
7.	"Prelude For Accordion Sousaphone and French Horn"	0:30
8.	"Oh God You're A Pie In The Sky"	0:55
9.	"Short Circuit Comes To Town"	0:13
10.	"Marching Toward A E I O U Blues"	0:47
11.	"In The Still Of The Night Again / Rumba"	2:01
12.	"Fourth Crucifixion in Five Years"	0:26
13.	"Oh Mommy Oh Daddy Can't You See That It's True Again"	1:05
14.	"Art the White Elephant"	1:11
15.	"Psychedelic and Orgasmic Finale"	5:58
Total length:		38:57
