= The Eyeball Show (Live In Japan) =

The 13th Anniversary Show: Live in Japan

Live album by the Residents
- Released: February 21, 1986
- Recorded: October 30, 1985
- Venue: Parco Space Part 3, Tokyo
- Label: Wave, Ralph, AIM, Virgin, Torso
- Producer: The Cryptic Corporation

The Residents chronology
The Big Bubble (1985)	The 13th Anniversary Show: Live in Japan (1986)	The 13th Anniversary Show Live in the U.S.A. (1986)

The Eyeball Show (a.k.a. The 13th Anniversary Show: Live in Japan) is a live album released by the American art rock group the Residents in 1986.

Professional ratings
Review scores
Source	Rating
AllMusic	4/5 stars

== History ==
The Residents' considerable success in Japan, particularly with 1984's George & James and 1985's The Big Bubble, led Wave Records, the group's Japanese distributor, to finance a brief Japanese tour in October 1985.

== Track listing ==
All tracks are written by the Residents, except where noted.

Side one
No.	Title	Writer(s)	Length
1.	"Jailhouse Rock"	Jerry Leiber / Mike Stoller
2.	"Where is She?"
3.	"Picnic in the Jungle"	Snakefinger / The Residents
4.	"Monkey & Bunny"	Renaldo and the Loaf / The Residents
5.	"This is a Man's Man's Man's World"	James Brown

Side two
No.	Title	Writer(s)	Length
6.	"Smelly Tongues"
7.	"Eloise"
8.	"Easter Woman"
9.	"Amber"
10.	"Red Rider"
11.	"Die in Terror"
12.	"The Coming of the Crow / Eva's Warning"	Snakefinger / The Residents
13.	"Cry for the Fire"

=== 1999 CD reissue (The 13th Anniversary Show – Live in Tokyo) ===
No.	Title	Writer(s)	Length
1.	"Lizard Lady"		2:26
2.	"Semolina"		3:56
3.	"Hello Skinny / Constantinople"		5:12
4.	"Jailhouse Rock"	Jerry Leiber / Mike Stoller	2:58
5.	"Where is She?"		2:24
6.	"Picnic in the Jungle"	Snakefinger / The Residents	5:41
7.	"Smelly Tongues"		2:17
8.	"Eloise"		1:12
9.	"The Ship's a'Goin' Down"		2:42
10.	"The New Machine"		1:22
11.	"Tourniquet of Roses"		2:35
12.	"Passing the Bottle"		1:30
13.	"Monkey and Bunny"	Renaldo and the Loaf / The Residents	4:23
14.	"Theme from an American TV Show"		1:20
15.	"Man's World"	James Brown	4:58
16.	"Walter Westinghouse"		8:29
17.	"Easter Woman"		2:11
18.	"Amber"		1:41
19.	"Red Rider"		1:27
20.	"Die in Terror"		1:25
21.	"The Coming of the Crow / Eva's Warning"	Snakefinger / The Residents	4:08
22.	"Cry for the Fire"		6:18
Total length:			1:10:35
