= WB: RMX =

Remix album by The Residents
- Released: February 22, 2004
- Recorded: September 1970–May 1971; 2003 (remixes)
- Genre: Experimental rock, psychedelic rock
- Length: 44:00
- Label: The Cryptic Corporation
- Producer: The Residents

The Residents chronology
Demons Dance Alone (2002)	WB: RMX (2004)	12 Days of Brumalia (2004)

WB:RMX is a remix album by The Residents, released in 2004. The album is a heavily altered remix of a 1971 demo tape that the band attempted to use to get signed to Warner Bros. Records.

The Residents originally got their name when the anonymous demo tape they recorded in 1971 (later called The Warner Bros. Album) was rejected by its recipient, Hal Halverstadt, the record executive who had signed Captain Beefheart and his Magic Band to Warner Bros. Records. It was returned addressed to "Residents, 20 Sycamore St." with a note awarding them an "A for Ariginality".

The demo was never heard by the public until it was played on a Portland, Oregon radio show in 1977. The group had been reluctant to truly release the demo due to recording quality and the fact that their sound had improved between that demo and their official first full-length LP, Meet the Residents. Upon learning that the demo tapes were being circulated via file sharing, the group remixed the original demo recordings and released them under the title. WB:RMX, though only less than half of the tracks from the original demo were included.

On Record Store Day 2018, the full demo was given its first official release as part of The Residents' pREServed remaster campaign.

== Track listing ==
1. "The Mad Sawmill of Copenhagen, Germany"
2. "Baby Skeletons and Dogs"
3. "Bop Bop (Shoobop Bop)"
4. "A Merican Fag"
5. "Oh Mommy Oh Daddy"
6. "Peace and Love"
7. "Christmas Morning Foto"
8. "Maggie's Farm"
9. "Snot and Feces Live at the Grunt Festival"
10. "Sweet Meat"
11. "Ohm Is Where the Art Is"
12. "Sell American"
13. "Love Theme from a Major Motion Picture"
14. "Pie in the Sky"
15. "Art, the White Elephant"
