= Crippled Intellect Productions =

Crippled Intellect Productions (C.I.P.) is a record label for experimental music based in Chicago, Illinois, and run by the sound artist Blake Edwards. Edwards performs and records under the name Vertonen, and is a member of Anatomy of Habit, Startless, Burrow, and sseepage. The label is known for discovering and supporting artists who are relatively unknown, or who are just starting in their careers. It also publishes work by the artists who inspired Edwards, such as Z'EV, The Hafler Trio, and Crawl Unit.

== Incremental Press ==
C.I.P. began in 1988 as a chapbook press in order to self-publish art and poetry by Blake Edwards. Seven chapbook titles were produced between 1988 and 1991. Editions were kept very small, and never went above 40. In December 1996, The publication side of C.I.P. was revived as Incremental Press (with crippled intellect press as an imprint) with the purchase of an ISBN and the publication of loquedeeshes, by Sherman Johnson.

== Early Releases ==
In the Fall of 1992, C.I.P. began publishing 7" records by Blake Edwards' solo project, Vertonen. The first releases still had ties to poetry, with spoken words and small booklets of text inserted into the sleeves.

== CD publishing ==
In 1998, C.I.P. published its first CDs, taking a major step away from the label's initial self-publishing focus. Marked by a high production quality and professional look, C.I.P. reissued on CD a rare cassette by uns, an alter ego of the percussionist Z'EV, with an accompanying booklet containing extensive liner notes by the artist. This was followed by a CD titled "Everyone Gets What They Deserve" by Crawl Unit, as the sound artist Joe Colley was then known. With the label now firmly established, C.I.P. began taking risks by producing new titles by artists from deep underground, including a musique concrete group from Connecticut called Brutum Fulmen, Nuisance Beacon, and a long-lived yet under-documented artist from San Francisco, Skozey Fetisch.

The label did continue to publish work by Edwards, who received grants from the City of Chicago Arts Council. These albums including Edwards' strongest work to date: Return of the Interrobang (a title which suggests his interest in language); the drone album Orchid Collider (with cover art by Jason Talbot); and a live album called Stations.

== Partial discography ==
- Vertonen Lock Up! 1-15 / Seizure (7")
- Vertonen Strip Mining / Camche (7")
- R/B Two Nights (7", Ltd, Cle)
- Vertonen The Women Men Leave Their Wives For (7")
- Vertonen Heat (7")
- Z'EV An uns Momento (CD)
- Autonext Volume One (7", Ltd)
- Crawl Unit / Vertonen Soundtracks For Locations (7")
- Crawl Unit Everyone Gets What They Deserve (CD)
- Nuisance Beacon Nuisance Beacon (CD)
- v/a Bhreus Kormo (CD)
- Joe Colley ANTHEM: Static For Empty Life (CD, Mini)
- Coeurl & Vertonen - Split Tour 7"
- V.V. - Note CD
- The Brutum Fulmen - Flesh Of The Moon CD
- Z'EV - Live 05.14.93 3"CD
- Panicsville & Vertonen - Coagulation 7"
- V.V. & Vertonen V.V.V. 7"
- Skozey Fetisch - Spectral Freight CD
- Howard Stelzer & Jason Talbot - Four Sides 2x7"
- Spider Compass Good Crime Band - Carrion Luggage Organ 7"
- Leticia Castaneda On The Verge Of Redundance CD
- Vertonen - Return Of The Interrobang CD
- Z'EV - N.A.M.E. Gallery, Chicago, Illinois 03.01.86 10"
- Nautical Almanac & Vertonen - Split LP
- Wolf Eyes - Lost Sockets 10"
- Alu - Autismenschen CD
- Jason Talbot - A Love So Bright It Shines A Hole Through My Heart CD
- Vertonen - Orchid Collider CD
- Hans Grüsel's Krankenkabinet - Happy As Pitch CD
- The Hafler Trio - If Take, Then Take: Tricks, Half-Tricks & Real Phenomena LP
- Joe Colley - No (Intermittent Positive Negation In Two Syllables) 7"
- PCRV - Big Sky CD
- K.K. Null & Z'EV - Artificial Life CD
- Vertonen - Stations CD
- Goat / SIXES / Xome - Deluxe Incinerator 3x3"CD
- Michael Gendreau & Francisco López - Drowning / Untitled #185 LP
- Bran(...)Pos - COIN-OP KHEPRI CD
- Vertonen & Demons - Grew Up In A Drought / Live Enemy LP
- Illusion Of Safety - Sedation & Quell 10"
- Jason Zeh - Heraclitus CD
