= Whatever Happened to Vileness Fats? =

Soundtrack album by the Residents
- Released: 1984
- Recorded: 1984
- Length: 35:57
- Label: Ralph
- Producer: The Residents

The Residents chronology
Assorted Secrets (1984)	Whatever Happened to Vileness Fats? (1984)	George & James (1984)

Professional ratings
Review scores
Source	Rating
AllMusic	4/5 stars

Whatever Happened to Vileness Fats? is the soundtrack to the 1984 video of the same name by the American art rock group the Residents.

== Track listing ==
All tracks are written by the Residents.

Side one
No.	Title	Length
1.	"Whatever Happened to Vileness Fats?"	4:09
2.	"Atomic Shopping Carts"	2:06
3.	"Adventures of a Troubled Heart"	3:13
4.	"Search for the Short Man"	1:23
5.	"The Importance of Evergreen"	6:09

Side two
No.	Title	Length
6.	"Broccoli and Saxophone"	3:39
7.	"Disguised as Meat"	3:02
8.	"Thoughts Busily Betraying"	1:50
9.	"Lord, It's Lonely"	1:31
10.	"The Knife Fight"	8:55
Total length:		35:57

- Track 6, "Broccoli and Saxophone", is split into 2 tracks on the 1991 CD edition, the second track being "Eloise".

=== 1991 CD bonus tracks ===
Tracks 12–20 are taken from the 1984 soundtrack to The Census Taker.

No.	Title	Length
12.	"Creeping Dread"	1:48
13.	"The Census Taker"	2:13
14.	"Talk"	0:38
15.	"Hellno"	2:24
16.	"Where is She?"	1:02
17.	"Innocence Decayed"	3:01
18.	"Romanian"	1:10
19.	"Passing the Bottle"	2:21
20.	"The Census Taker Returns"	0:46
Total length:		51:20
