= Stars & Hank Forever: The American Composers Series =

Stars & Hank Forever

Studio album by the Residents
- Released: October 21, 1986
- Recorded: 1986
- Length: 42:58
- Label: Ralph
- Producer: The Cryptic Corporation

The Residents chronology
The Big Bubble (1985)	Stars & Hank Forever (1986)	God in Three Persons (1988)

Singles from Stars & Hank Forever
- 1. "Kaw-Liga" / "The Stars and Stripes Forever" Released: 1986; 2. "Kaw-Liga" / "Jambalaya" Released: 1986

Professional ratings
Review scores
Source	Rating
AllMusic	3/5 stars

Stars & Hank Forever is the fourteenth studio album by American art rock group the Residents. Released in 1986, it is the second and last album in the American Composer series before its cancellation due to increasing difficulties in maintaining the project.

The track "Kaw-Liga" is a cover of Hank Williams 1953 song and samples the rhythm and bassline of Michael Jackson's "Billie Jean" (a reference to country singer Billie Jean Horton, who was married to Williams before his death). It was later issued as a single and did well in the emerging European club scene, spawning several remixes; it is as close as the Residents ever got to a bona fide commercial hit.

The "Sousaside" features sound effects recorded by Philip Perkins to create the effect of a marching band on a happy occasion; a mix of "The Stars and Stripes Forever" without sound effects was released as a B-side to the "Kaw-Liga" single.

Stars & Hank Forever is also the last studio album to feature guitarist Snakefinger, before his early death in July 1987. The Williams song "Six More Miles" has since become a sort of ceremonial number for the Residents, being performed in tribute to Snakefinger in 1987, and recently as an encore in 2018 in tribute to the death of Hardy Fox, one of the founding members of the group.

Fox described John Philip Sousa as, "one of the most solid, totally American composers there is. He was a true original. He virtually invented American patriotic music, and during his lifetime he was the Beatles. He's like the counterpart to Stravinsky. At that time marching bands were where it was at and he had the hottest one. But the music, if you listen to it, is very intricate, very baroque."

== Track listing ==
Side one – Hank Williams

All tracks are written by Hank Williams, except "Kaw-Liga" by Williams and Fred Rose.

No.	Title	Length
1.	"Hey Good Lookin'"	2:47
2.	"Six More Miles (To the Graveyard)"	4:15
3.	"Kaw-Liga"	4:52
4.	"Ramblin' Man"	3:13
5.	"Jambalaya"	4:43
Total length:		19:50

Side two – John Philip Sousa

All tracks are written by John Philip Sousa.

No.	Title	Length
6.	"Sousaside: I. "Nobles of the Mystic Shrine" – 4:40; II. "The Stars and Stripes Forever" – 3:10; III. "The Thunderer" (initially mistitled "El Capitan") – 3:30; IV. "The Liberty Bell" – 4:10; V. "Semper Fidelis" – 3:10; VI. "The Washington Post – 4:30"	23:10

Torso CD bonus track
No.	Title	Writer(s)	Length
7.	"Kaw-Liga (Prairie mix)"	Williams / Rose	9:28
Total length:			52:28

== Personnel ==
- The Residents – performance, arrangements
- Snakefinger – slide guitar on "Hey Good Lookin'"
