= Chewing Hides the Sound =

Studio album by Snakefinger
- Released: 1979; 23 November 1979 (UK)
- Genre: Rock, Avant-Garde, Blues
- Label: Ralph; Virgin (UK)
- Producer: Snakefinger & The Residents

Snakefinger chronology
Bongos Over Balham (1974)	Chewing Hides the Sound (1979)	Greener Postures (1980)

Singles from Chewing Hides The Sound
- 1. "What Wilbur?" Released: 1979; 2. "The Model" Released: Mar 1980

Professional ratings
Review scores
Source	Rating
AllMusic	3.5/5 stars
Trouser Press	unfavourable

Chewing Hides The Sound was Snakefinger's first full-length album, released by Ralph Records in 1979. The record is co-produced with The Residents, who also co-wrote many of the songs. The album has the distinction of featuring the first recorded cover version of Kraftwerk's song "The Model", it also features the cover of "Magic and Ecstasy" by Ennio Morricone from the soundtrack of Exorcist II: The Heretic.

== Track listing ==
1. "The Model"
2. "Kill the Great Raven"
3. "Jesus Was a Leprechaun"
4. "Here Come the Bums"
5. "The Vivian Girls"
6. "Magic and Ecstasy"
7. "Who Is the Culprit and Who Is the Victim?"
8. "What Wilbur?"
9. "Picnic in the Jungle"
10. "Friendly Warning"
11. "I Love Mary"
12. "The Vultures of Bombay"

== Personnel ==
- Performance: Snakefinger and The Residents
- Soprano Saxophone: Steven Brown
- Bass: Phil Culp
- Percussion: Don Jackovich
