= The 13th Anniversary Show Live in the U.S.A. =

The 13th Anniversary Tour Live in the U.S.A.!

Live album by the Residents featuring Snakefinger
- Released: 1986
- Recorded: February 10, 1986
- Venue: First Avenue in Minneapolis, Minnesota

The Residents featuring Snakefinger chronology
The Eyeball Show (Live In Japan) (1986)	The 13th Anniversary Tour Live in the U.S.A.! (1986)	Stars & Hank Forever: The American Composers Series (1986)

Professional ratings
Review scores
Source	Rating
AllMusic	3/5 stars

The 13th Anniversary Tour Live in the U.S.A.! is a live album by American art rock group the Residents. It was originally released in 1986 as a double cassette and re-released on CD in 1992 by the Residents fan club UWEB. Both versions of the release are difficult to find, as they were both limited to 500 copies each. It resurfaced again in 2009 on the band's website as an MP3 download, and was reissued as another limited edition double CD (now out of print) and Bandcamp download - with every song having its own track, plus a bonus song – by the Viennese label Klanggalerie in 2017.

== Red Eyeball Mask Eulogy ==
The intro to this version of the show is a "eulogy" for the red eyeball mask, worn by a member of the Residents, which was stolen after one of the shows and subsequently returned. During this show, black armbands were handed out to mourn the loss. The group felt that the eyeball was cursed, and the wearer from that time on became Mr. Skull, performing with a large skull mask instead of the trademark eyeball.

== Ralph double cassette/Klanggalerie track listing ==
1. "Intro" (1:12)
2. "Lizard Lady" (2:46)
3. "Semolina" (3:52)
4. "Hello Skinny" (3:31)
5. "Constantinople" (3:46)
6. "Jailhouse Rock" (3:04)
7. "Where is She?" (4:39)
8. "Picnic in the Jungle" (6:59)
9. "Smelly Tongues" (2:09)
10. "Eloise" (1:14)
11. "Ship's a'Going Down" (with uncredited excerpt of "The New Machine") (4:18)
12. "Tourniquet of Roses" (3:16)
13. "I Got Rhythm" (3:02)
14. "Passing the Bottle" (1:55)
15. "Monkey and Bunny" (4:33)
16. "Theme for an American TV Show" (1:46)
17. "It's a Man's Man's Man's World" (5:54)
18. "Walter Westinghouse" (9:00)
19. "Easter Woman" (2:31)
20. "Amber" (1:45)
21. "Red Rider" (1:31)
22. "Die in Terror" (1:25)
23. "Coming of the Crow" (1:41)
24. "Eva's Warning" (with uncredited reprise of "Coming of the Crow") (5:02)
25. "The Big Bubble" (2:26)
26. "Hop a Little" (3:22)
27. "Cry for the Fire" (7:31)
28. "Diskomo" (5:23) (credited as "Festival of Death" on the Klanggalerie release)
29. "Kaw-Liga" (2:39) (Klanggalerie release bonus track; recorded during the 13th Anniversary Tour in Europe)

== UWEB 2CD track listing ==
1. "Intro" (1:11)
2. "Lizard Lady/Semolina/Hello Skinny/Constantinople/Jailhouse Rock/Where is She?/Picnic in the Jungle" (29:41)
3. "Smelly Tongues/Eloise/Ship's Agoin' Down/Tourniquet of Roses" (10:58)
4. "I Got Rhythm/Passing the Bottle/Monkey & Bunny/Theme for an American TV Show/Man's Man's Man's World" (17:10)
5. "Walter Westinghouse" (9:01)
6. "Easter Woman/Amber/Red Rider/Die in Terror/Coming of the Crow/Eva's Warning" (13:59)
7. "Big Bubble/Hop a Little/Cry for the Fire" (13:18)
8. "Diskomo" (5:22)
