= Tipsy (band) =

American musical group

- Origin: San Francisco, California, US
- Genres: Electronic, lounge, downtempo
- Years active: 1996–present
- Labels: Asphodel Records, Ipecac Recordings
- Members: Tim Digulla; David Gardner
- Website: www.tipsy.org

Tipsy is an American electronic music group. Based in San Francisco, California, it consists of Tim Digulla and David Gardner.

In 1996, Tipsy released an album, Trip Tease, on Asphodel Records. In 2015, Fact placed it at number 44 on the "50 Best Trip-Hop Albums of All Time" list. In 2001, Tipsy released the second album, Uh-Oh!, on Asphodel Records. In 2008, Tipsy released the third album, Buzzz, on Ipecac Recordings.

== Discography ==
Studio albums

- Trip Tease (1996)
- Uh-Oh! (2001)
- Buzzz (2008)

Compilation albums

- Remix Party! (2002)

Singles

- "Nude on the Moon" / "Space Golf" (1996)
- "Grossenhösen Mit Mr. Excitement" (1997)
- "Flying Monkey Fist" (1998)
- "Hard Petting" (2000)
