= Babyfingers =

EP by The Residents
- Released: September 1979
- Recorded: November 1976–November 1977
- Genre: Avant-garde, experimental rock
- Length: 15:56
- Label: Ralph

The Residents chronology
Eskimo (1979)	Babyfingers (1979)	Commercial Album (1980)

Babyfingers is an EP by avant garde/experimental rock band The Residents, containing music written for their 1977 album, Fingerprince. While the EP was released in 1979, most of its tracks premiered on The Residents' Radio Special in September 1977. The EP was initially sent to mail-order customers who had been waiting for their copy of the Third Reich 'N' Roll collector's box set. It was later sent to members of the W.E.I.R.D. fan club.

The EP is now out of print, but all of its music has been incorporated into most CD editions of Fingerprince.

== Track listing ==
1. "Monstrous Intro" (unlisted) – 0:41
2. "Death in Barstow" – 2:03
3. "Melon Collie Lassie" – 2:53
4. "Flight of the Bumble Roach" – 2:14
5. "Walter Westinghouse" – 8:05
