= Assorted Secrets =

Compilation album by The Residents
- Released: 1984
- Recorded: Fall 1981 – May 5, 1983
- Length: 58:40 (1984); 69:36 (2000)
- Label: Ralph
- Producers: Scott Fraser, the Cryptic Corporation

The Residents chronology
Residue of the Residents (1983)	Assorted Secrets (1984)	Whatever Happened to Vileness Fats? (1984)

Professional ratings
Review scores
Source	Rating
AllMusic	2.5/5 stars

Assorted Secrets is a compilation of live and studio rehearsals released by American art rock group the Residents in 1984, originally as a cassette-only release due to the recording and performance quality not meeting the group's standards at the time. Not originally meant to be heard by the public, the cassette was eventually produced and released for much-needed profit following the financial difficulties of the Mole Show tour.

== Track listing ==
All tracks are written by The Residents.

Side one (Live in Santa Monica, April 10, 1982)
No.	Title	Length
1.	"Mark of the Mole"	33:40

Side two (Live in the Studio)
No.	Title	Length
1.	"The Letter"	2:13
2.	"Ship's a'Goin' Down"	2:32
3.	"Bach is Dead"	1:20
4.	"Birthday Boy"	3:41
5.	"Constantinople"	2:10
6.	"Die in Terror"	2:17
7.	"Give it to Someone Else"	0:58
8.	"Smack Your Lips" (May 5 1983 rehearsal)	4:03
9.	"Song of the Wild" (May 5 1983 rehearsal)	3:32
10.	"Happy Home" (May 5 1983 rehearsal)	2:14
Total length:		58:40

- Tracks 1–7 were recorded between fall of 1981 and spring of 1982.
- Tracks 8–10 were recorded on May 5, 1983.

=== 2000 CD reissue ===
No.	Title	Length
1.	"God Song"	1:33
2.	"The Letter"	2:13
3.	"Ship's a'Goin' Down"	2:32
4.	"Bach is Dead"	1:20
5.	"Birthday Boy"	3:41
6.	"Constantinople"	2:10
7.	"Die in Terror"	2:17
8.	"Give it to Someone Else"	0:58
9.	"The Festival of Death"	9:23
10.	"Smack Your Lips"	4:03
11.	"Song of the Wild"	3:32
12.	"Happy Home"	2:14
13.	"Mark of the Mole, part 1"	14:43
14.	"Mark of the Mole, part 2"	10:44
15.	"Mark of the Mole, part 3"	8:13
Total length:		1:09:36
