= Rhythm & Noise =

US musical group

- Also known as: Cellar-M
- Origin: San Francisco, California, United States
- Genres: Avant-garde; electronic; experimental; noise
- Years active: 1976–present
- Label: Ralph
- Members: Naut Humon
- Past members: Nik Fault; Rex Probe; Desmond Shea; Z'EV

Rhythm & Noise were an American Experimental music and multimedia ensemble from San Francisco, California. The group originally consisted of Naut Humon, Nik Fault, and Rex Probe, who started the project in the mid-70s under the name Cellar-M. In 1984, The Residents convinced the band to join their label Ralph Records, under which the group released two albums and an extended music video. Naut Humon decided against releasing anymore records under the name Rhythm & Noise and began focusing on his work with Sound Traffic Control.

== Discography ==
Studio albums

- Contents Under Notice (1984, Ralph)
- Chasms Accord (1985, Ralph)

VHSs

- Shadowkrack (1984, Ralph)
