= The Third Reich 'n Roll =

Studio album by the Residents
- Released: February 1976
- Recorded: October 1974 - October 1975
- Genres: Experimental rock, experimental music
- Length: 37:08
- Label: Ralph
- Producer: The Residents

The Residents chronology
Meet the Residents (1974)	The Third Reich 'n Roll (1976)	Fingerprince (1977)

The Third Reich 'n Roll is the second studio album by the American experimental rock band the Residents, released on Ralph Records in 1976. The album consists of two side-long suites of "'semi-phonetic' interpretations of Top 40 rock and roll from the Sixties."

The album generated some controversy due to its cover art and Nazi imagery (promotional photos featured the Residents dressed as giant swastikas and wearing oversized swastika glasses). A window display in Berkeley was met with protests and threats of violence. Regardless, it is considered one of the group's masterworks along with most of their material from the 1970s.

== Recording ==
In 1974, the Residents were considering making their follow-up to Meet the Residents as a cover album. They initially wanted their friend Snakefinger to play guitar on the album but as he was in England at the time, the group instead searched for a local guitarist, and eventually Gary Phillips of Earth Quake was suggested to them. The Residents recorded "Swastikas on Parade" in one week during October 1974. The next year, the Residents returned to the concept and recorded the second track, titled "Hitler Was a Vegetarian".

== Music video ==
In 1972, while on a break from filming Vileness Fats, the Residents produced a short film in which they danced and played in a newspaper-covered room, fully dressed in newspaper suits. Later in 1976, in order to promote their third album (the second one having been recorded in secrecy), the Residents synced this short film up with an edited version of "Swastikas on Parade", and filmed additional scenes on the set of Vileness Fats. The resulting video, entitled "The Residents Play the Third Reich 'n' Roll", drew small controversy on the fact the band's newspaper suits resembled Ku Klux Klan outfits, but the Residents have insisted it is not an intentional connection. Regardless, the short film is credited as one of the first examples of the music video as an art form, and is included in the permanent collection of the Museum of Modern Art in New York.

== Concept ==
According to the album's original liner notes, entitled "Why do the Residents hate the Beatles?" (in reference to the cover art of their previous album Meet the Residents), the Third Reich 'n' Roll is a commentary on how "rock and roll has brainwashed the youth of the world."

None of the songs are named anywhere on the album; some are obvious, while others are either unrecognizable or played simultaneously. Notable selections include "In-A-Gadda-Da-Vida", "Land of a Thousand Dances", "Double Shot (Of My Baby's Love)", "Papa's Got a Brand New Bag" (sung in German), "Wipe Out", "96 Tears", "Yummy Yummy Yummy", and "Hey Jude" (paired with "Sympathy for the Devil").

The Residents would later record a cover of another Rolling Stones song, "(I Can't Get No) Satisfaction", and release it as a single to promote the album. Originally a limited edition, it would be re-released in 1978 to capitalize on the group's unexpected success on the British new wave charts.

== Packaging ==
The album artwork was designed by Porno Graphics. The front cover depicts Dick Clark, host of American Bandstand, dressed as Adolf Hitler and holding a carrot. In the background, couples with Hitler's face superimposed over their heads are seen dancing on clouds. There is text that reads "THE RESIDENTS PRESENT THE THIRD REICH 'N ROLL", "THIS SIDE EXPLAINS WHY HITLER WAS A VEGETARIAN", "RALPH RECORDS", "FIRST PRESSING - 1000 DISCS", "PRODUCED BY RESIDENTS, UNINC." and "JACKET BY PORNO/GRAPHICS". The back cover has six Reichsadleren arranged in a Star of David with a swastika in the center. There is text that reads "THE RESIDENTS PRESENT THE THIRD REICH 'N ROLL", "THIS SIDE IS USUALLY SWASTIKAS ON PARADE", "SEE VILENESS FATS - COMING SOON TO A THEATER OR DRIVE-IN NEAR YOU", "RR1075", "RECORDED AT EL RALPHO STUDIOS" and "WORLD SERIES '74-'75".

This artwork was extremely controversial, along with the promotion, which followed the Nazi aesthetic of the cover. A window display in Berkeley, which was swastika-themed, was met with outrage and lasted only two days before being taken down. Due to Nazi imagery being banned from public display in Germany and Austria, the album was not available in Europe until 1981, when the album was released in Europe with "CENSORED!" stickers being placed over any explicit Nazi imagery and Dick Clark's eyes. Another European cover would be created in 1993, depicting Adolf Hitler holding a carrot and Madonna holding one of the Residents' signature eyeball masks.

== Reception ==
Professional ratings
Review scores
Source	Rating
AllMusic	4/5 stars
The Encyclopedia of Popular Music	3/5 stars
The Great Rock Discography	6/10
MusicHound Rock	4.5/5 stars
The Rolling Stone Album Guide	3.5/5 stars
Sounds	5/5 stars
Spin Alternative Record Guide	8/10
Sputnikmusic	4/5

In the December 31, 1977, issue of Sounds, Jon Savage described the album as "Funny – and frightening." Peter Silverton described the album as the Residents' "one unqualified masterpiece," and "the best party game of the Seventies." Fact ranked the album at No. 70 on their Top 100 Albums of the 1970s, calling it "the precursor for everything from the KLF to Matmos, the Church of the SubGenius to the Fall."

== Legacy ==
The album is considered by some to be a precursor for plunderphonics and mashup music, and the Residents are sometimes credited with popularizing the practice of sampling in commercial music. The album also features what is thought to be the first James Brown sample on a commercially released record, borrowing a horn hit directly from the original King Records 45 of "Papa's Got a Brand New Bag" on "Swastikas on Parade". This sample predates hip-hop's adaptations of Brown riffs, beats, and soundbites by about 15 years.

The practice of cover songs went on to be a staple of the Residents' musical oeuvre. Later notable cover projects include the 1977 single The Beatles Play the Residents and the Residents Play the Beatles, the 1980s American Composers series (spawning two albums: George & James and Stars & Hank Forever) and The King & Eye, a 1989 album of Elvis Presley covers.

The Residents would perform the Swingin' Medallions' "Double Shot" in its entirety in 1988 for a single to promote their album God in Three Persons, in which the song's main riff is a recurring motif. The song would also be referenced on the 1989 Cube E show.

== Track listing ==
All tracks are written by the Residents, except where noted.

Side A
No.	Title	Length
1.	"Swastikas on Parade"	18:06

Side B
No.	Title	Length
2.	"Hitler Was a Vegetarian"	19:02
Total length:		37:08

Bonus tracks for 1988 and Japanese 2009 CDs
No.	Title	Writer(s)	Length
3.	"Satisfaction"	Mick Jagger / Keith Richards	4:33
4.	"Loser ≅ Weed"		2:12
5.	"Beyond the Valley of a Day in the Life"		3:59
6.	"Flying"	John Lennon / Paul McCartney / George Harrison / Ringo Starr	3:24

=== 2018 pREServed edition ===
Disc one
No.	Title	Writer(s)	Length
1.	"Swastikas on Parade"		17:29
2.	"Hitler Was a Vegetarian"		18:22
3.	"Satisfaction"	Mick Jagger / Keith Richards	4:33
4.	"Loser ≅ Weed"		2:12
5.	"Beyond the Valley of a Day in the Life"		3:59
6.	"Flying"	John Lennon / Paul McCartney / George Harrison / Ringo Starr	3:24
7.	"German Slide Music pt. 1"		3:29
8.	"German Slide Music pt. 2"		1:27
9.	"German Slide Music pt. 4"		2:17
10.	"German Slide Music pt. 5"		4:10
11.	"German Slide Music pt. 6"		4:17

Disc two
No.	Title	Writer(s)	Length
1.	"The 'Oh Mummy' Show" (live 1976)		29:35
2.	"The Letter" (1982 rehearsal)	Wayne Carson	1:40
3.	"Satisfaction" (live in Madrid, 1983)		3:50
4.	"Land of 1000 Dances" (Scott Colburn 1992 mix)	Chris Kenner	4:11
5.	"Loser ≅ Weed" (live 2013)		2:57
6.	"Third Reich" (Icky Flix DVD mix)		4:28
7.	"Third Reich" (live 2001)		4:44
8.	"'Oh Mummy' backing tape concentrate"		11:05
9.	"Third Reich outtakes reel"		6:06

After a couple seconds of silence following track 9, an unlisted track plays. It is a radio ad for the Rather Ripped Records fifth birthday party on June 7, 1976, at which the Residents performed; their entire set from that event is presented on disc 2 as track 1.

== Personnel ==
- The Residents – vocals, drums, soprano sax, alto sax, cornet, French horn, clarinet, trombone, synthesizers, pipe organ, xylophone, piped snooter, electric violin, piano, organ, guitars, oud, bass, garbage drums, stretch globel, koto, accordion, hanging lamp, rubber board
- Pamela Zeibak and Peggy Honeydew – additional vocals
- Gary Phillips (credited as "the former bass player from the Front Line") – fancy electric guitar
