= The Beatles Play the Residents and the Residents Play the Beatles =

Single by the Residents
- A-side: "Beyond the Valley of a Day in the Life"
- B-side: "Flying"
- Released: 1977
- Genre: Experimental
- Label: Ralph
- Songwriters: Lennon–McCartney; Harrison; Roy Lee Johnson; Larry Williams; the Residents

The Residents singles chronology
"Satisfaction" (1976)	"The Beatles Play the Residents and the Residents Play the Beatles" (1977)	"Santa Dog '78" (1978)

"The Beatles Play the Residents and the Residents Play the Beatles" is a 1977 single by the Residents. The A-side, "Beyond the Valley of a Day in the Life", is an audio collage of recordings by the Beatles and John Lennon, with a looped clip from the Beatles' third Christmas record, in which Paul McCartney says "Please everybody, if we haven't done what we could have done, we've tried."

The B-side, "Flying", is a cover of the Beatles song, selected because it (along with "Dig It") is one of the few songs to be credited to all four Beatles. At one point, one of the Residents quotes the clip from the McCartney interview used on the A-side and laughs maniacally.

The single, particularly the B-side, reflects the Residents' boredom with pop music and their tendency to perform deconstructionist covers, perhaps shown most notably on their album The Third Reich 'n Roll.

It was originally released as a 7" single that was limited and numbered to 500 copies, with three different hand-screened sleeves.

== "Beyond the Valley of a Day in the Life" ==
This track is a collage of recordings by the Beatles, plus one song by John Lennon. In addition to the snippet of dialogue from the 1965 Christmas record, the track contains the following songs:

- "A Day in the Life"
- "The End"
- "Lady Madonna"
- "A Hard Day's Night"
- "Tell Me What You See"
- "God", by John Lennon
- "Her Majesty"
- "Tell Me Why"
- "I Am the Walrus"
- "Blue Jay Way"
- "Can't Buy Me Love"
- "Another Girl"
- "All I've Got to Do"
- "All My Loving"
- "Girl"
- "In My Life"
- "Yellow Submarine"
- "No Reply"
- "I'm a Loser"
- "Mr. Moonlight"
- "Love You To"
- "She Loves You"
- "Hey Bulldog"
- "Bad Boy"
