= Fingerprince =

Studio album by the Residents
- Released: February 1977
- Recorded: 1974–1976
- Genre: Experimental music
- Length: 36:32 (LP); 49:43 (CD)
- Label: Ralph

The Residents chronology
| The Third Reich 'n' Roll (1976) | Fingerprince (1977) | Radio Special (1977) |

Fingerprince is the third studio album by American experimental rock band the Residents, released in 1977. It was allegedly intended to be a three-sided record titled Tourniquet of Roses, but due to financial difficulties in fulfilling such a project, the record was instead cut down to a regular two-sided album.

The album is considered a transitional period for the Residents, between the early avant-garde stylings of Meet the Residents and The Third Reich 'n Roll and the minimalist song structures of Duck Stab and Commercial Album.

== Music ==
Fingerprince's first side consists of short, minimalist songs featuring skeletal drum machines, emphasized horn and percussion sections, murky atmospherics (except for the upbeat "You Yesyesyes") and a bigger focus on vocals and lyrics.

The second side consists of one 17-minute track titled "Six Things to a Cycle", originally written as a ballet. It is an instrumental suite composed of six movements, with a strong focus on percussion and repetition of a single motif. Eventually the improvised percussion is joined by wordless vocals, keyboards, horns and violins.

A third side of music was planned for the album before the decision to release it as a standard single LP. This third side was eventually released in 1979 as an EP titled Babyfingers, which mirrors the standard LP – short songs on one side, a single long composition on the other side.

== Release history ==
For the CD release of Fingerprince, all of the songs from Babyfingers, which were originally supposed to be part of the record, were included in their original running order.

The 1995 Euro Ralph CD reissue of Fingerprince kept the original track order from the original LP but included the complete Babyfingers as a bonus 3" CD with the album. All subsequent reissues of the album include all three sides, with slight alterations in the track order.

== Reception ==
Professional ratings
Review scores
| Source | Rating |
|---|---|
| AllMusic | 3/5 stars |
| Christgau's Record Guide | B |
| The Encyclopedia of Popular Music | 3/5 stars |
| The Great Rock Discography | 6/10 |
| MusicHound Rock | 4/5 stars |
| The Rolling Stone Album Guide | 3/5 stars |
| Sounds | 5/5 stars |
| Spin Alternative Record Guide | 6/10 |

In the December 31, 1977, issue of Sounds, Jon Savage notes that this album is more accessible than the band's first two albums, comparing it to Steely Dan and Frank Zappa "put through 10 years and a considerable warp." He also compares the Residents' integrity and outrage to the first punk "explosion." Andy Gill of New Musical Express compared the second side of the album to Harry Partch.

== Track listing ==
All tracks are written by the Residents.

Side one
| No. | Title | Length |
|---|---|---|
| 1. | "You Yesyesyes" | 3:00 |
| 2. | "Home Age Conversation" | 2:03 |
| 3. | "Godsong" | 3:41 |
| 4. | "March de la Winni" | 0:58 |
| 5. | "Bossy" | 1:00 |
| 6. | "Boo Who?" | 2:48 |
| 7. | "Tourniquet of Roses" | 3:15 |
| 8. | "You Yesyesyes Again" | 2:35 |
| Total length: | | 20:32 |

Side two
| No. | Title | Length |
|---|---|---|
| 1. | "Six Things to a Cycle" | 18:33 |
| Total length: | | 18:33 |

=== CD releases ===
| No. | Title | Length |
|---|---|---|
| 1. | "You Yesyesyes" | 3:00 |
| 2. | "Home Age Conversation" | 2:03 |
| 3. | "Godsong" | 3:41 |
| 4. | "March de la Winni" | 0:58 |
| 5. | "Bossy" | 1:00 |
| 6. | "Boo Who?" | 2:48 |
| 7. | "Tourniquet of Roses" | 3:15 |
| 8. | "Death in Barstow" | 2:05 |
| 9. | "Melon Collie Lassie" | 2:51 |
| 10. | "Flight of the Bumble Roach" | 2:55 |
| 11. | "Walter Westinghouse" | 8:02 |
| 12. | "Six Things to a Cycle: Part 1" | 2:47 |
| 13. | "Six Things to a Cycle: Part 2" | 1:38 |
| 14. | "Six Things to a Cycle: Part 3" | 2:26 |
| 15. | "Six Things to a Cycle: Part 4" | 3:49 |
| 16. | "Six Things to a Cycle: Part 5" | 4:50 |
| 17. | "Six Things to a Cycle: Part 6" | 2:17 |
| 18. | "You Yesyesyes Again" | 2:38 |
| Total length: | | 49:43 |

=== 2018 pREServed Edition ===
Disc one
| No. | Title | Length |
|---|---|---|
| 1. | "You Yesyesyes" | 2:59 |
| 2. | "Home Age Conversation" | 2:05 |
| 3. | "Godsong" | 3:42 |
| 4. | "March de la Winni" | 1:00 |
| 5. | "Bossy" | 1:03 |
| 6. | "Boo Who?" | 2:51 |
| 7. | "Tourniquet of Roses" | 3:16 |
| 8. | "You Yesyesyes Again" | 2:46 |
| 9. | "Six Things to a Cycle" | 17:44 |
| 10. | "Monstrous Intro" | 0:41 |
| 11. | "Death in Barstow" | 2:03 |
| 12. | "Melon Collie Lassie" | 2:53 |
| 13. | "Flight of the Bumble Roach" | 2:14 |
| 14. | "Walter Westinghouse" | 8:05 |
| Total length: | | 53:00 |

Disc two
| No. | Title | Length |
|---|---|---|
| 1. | "Leapmus" (February 1976) | 14:37 |
| 2. | "Entrance to Crypt" | 1:10 |
| 3. | "Clumsy Climb" | 1:55 |
| 4. | "Piano Dittie" | 1:21 |
| 5. | "You Yesyesyes" ("Oh Mummy" mix) | 1:53 |
| 6. | "Whoopy Snorp" | 3:44 |
| 7. | "Godsong" (1982 rehearsal) | 1:34 |
| 8. | "Walter Westinghouse" (1982 rehearsal) | 6:45 |
| 9. | "Godsong" (studio rehearsal) | 1:32 |
| 10. | "Tourniquet of Roses" (Tromsø, inconvenienced, 1986) | 2:44 |
| 11. | "Walter Westinghouse" (live 1997) | 6:24 |
| 12. | "Once I Went to Barstow" (live 2011) | 4:48 |
| 13. | "Melon Collie Lassie" (live 2014) | 3:34 |
| 14. | "Fingerprince Concentrate" | 7:53 |
| Total length: | | 59:00 |

== Personnel ==
- The Residents – vocals, guitars, horns, synthesizers, keyboards, percussion
- Snakefinger – vocals, guitars
- Don Jackovich – percussion
- Adrian Dekbar – violin
- Tony Logan – percussion
- Pamela Zeibak – vocals
