= Asphodel Records =

Defunct American record label

- Founded: 1992
- Founder: Mitzi Johnson, Naut Humon
- Distributors: Revolver USA, Forced Exposure, Crosstalk
- Genre: Indie
- Country of origin: United States
- Location: San Francisco, California
- Official website: asphodel.com archive

Asphodel Ltd (a.k.a. Asphodel Records) was a San Francisco-based independent record label founded by musician Mitzi Johnson and Naut Humon in 1992. The label is named after the mythological flower that grows along the banks of the River Styx in Hades. The label had shut down as of January 2011.

Asphodel has a diverse catalog of releases with a prominent experimental thread in the genres of turntablism, electronica, ambient, illbient, electroacoustic, trip hop, spoken word, noise, techno, and lounge.

== History ==
The label's first release was the self-titled debut by Johnson's band, Blue Rubies. In 1995, Asphodel released the second volume of the Incredibly Strange Music compilation, a companion to the counterculture zine RE/Search (edited by V. Vale, a friend of Naut Humon and Mitzi Johnson). In 1996, the label released the Excursions In Illbient compilation, which was partly responsible in naming this genre.

Naut Humon became the official Asphodel head of A&R in 1994. Erik Gilbert served as the label's General Manager, before becoming the Vice President of Content at the Independent Online Distribution Alliance before Sony restructured it to become The Orchard.

Asphodel was named one of the "top 10 independent labels in the world" by Rolling Stone magazine in 1998.

Speaking on the legacy of Asphodel, [Erik] Gilbert underlined its uncompromising stance and approach: "Incredible artists, incredible albums. I am honoured and proud to have been involved with them. Nothing has since come close." For [Gregor] Asch, without Naut there would be no DJ Olive as we knew him and perhaps no illbient. "The label is Naut’s legacy really," he admits. "Quality sampling from emerging sounds on the meridian between the underground and the popular. A world class grasp of production and mastering while always pushing the boundaries of a surround performance experience."

Between 2002 and 2007, the number of releases decreased. As of January 2011, a message on the asphodel.com last snapshot reads, "Asphodel is now closed. Thank you for the love and support. Mitzi Johnson, San Francisco January, 2011".

== Artists ==
- AGF.3 + SUE.C
- Alexander Rishaug
- Ann Magnuson
- antimatter
- Badawi
- Biosphere
- Blue Rubies
- Broker/Dealer
- Byzar
- Christian Marclay
- Curtis Roads
- Daniel Menche
- David Darling
- Diamanda Galas
- DJ Spooky
- Fe-Mail
- Fires Were Shot
- Gregory Lenczycki
- Iannis Xenakis
- Invisibl Skratch Piklz
- Iso Orchestra
- Janek Schaefer
- Jeff Greinke
- John Cage
- John Ward
- Ken Nordine
- KK Null
- Laminar
- Li Alin
- Martin Ng, Oren Ambarchi, Tina Frank, Robin Fox
- Maryanne Amacher
- Mix Master Mike
- Naut Humon
- Otomo Yoshihide
- Phil Crumar
- Ray Guillette
- Reinhold Friedl
- Rhythm & Sound
- Richard Devine
- Robert Rich
- Ryuichi Sakamoto
- Single Cell Orchestra
- Steve Roach
- Sub Dub
- The-Allies
- Thomas Dimuzio
- Tipsy
- Ulf Langheinrich
- Vidna Obmana
- We™
- World Standard
- X-Ecutioners
- Yasunao Tone
- zeitkratzer
- [The User]

== See also ==
- Naut Humon
- List of record labels
