= Mark of the Mole =

Studio album by The Residents
- Released: September 1981
- Recorded: October 1979 – July 1981
- Genres: Experimental, industrial
- Length: 40:49
- Labels: Ralph, East Side Digital

The Residents chronology
Commercial Album (1980)	Mark of the Mole (1981)	The Tunes of Two Cities (1982)

Professional ratings
Review scores
Source	Rating
AllMusic	4/5 stars
Record Mirror	5/5 stars

Mark of the Mole is the eighth studio album by American art rock group The Residents, released in 1981 on Ralph Records. It was the first in what was intended to be a "trilogy" (of six albums) with a narrative centred on a conflict between two rival peoples, the Moles and the Chubs.

== Concept ==
Mark of the Mole introduces the Moles (a subterranean society whose gods offer salvation through hard labor) who are forced to abandon their tunnels due to flooding at the start of the album. The Moles enter the land of the Chubs (a vapid, hedonistic culture which resides under the sea), seeking work and a new home.

Initially, the Moles are welcomed with open arms because the Chubs despise hard labor. Conflict arises when a Chub scientist invents a machine that can do the work instead, making the Moles obsolete and sparking a brief war. The short instrumental track "Resolution?" ends the album without giving a clear conclusion to the narrative; the liner notes to the album The Big Bubble (billed as "Part Four of the Mole Trilogy") states that the war ended with no clear winner, and the two ethnic groups live together in uneasy peace into the next generation.

== History ==
Mark of the Mole and its follow-up album, The Tunes of Two Cities, became the basis for The Residents' first international touring production, The Mole Show. Penn Jillette, who appeared as MC of the Mole Show, has an uncredited appearance as a weatherman on "Voices of the Air."

An Atari 2600 game based on the album was being developed by Greg Easter in 1983, but it was later cancelled.

== Track listing ==
All tracks are written by The Residents.

Side one - "Hole Workers at the Mercies of Nature"
No.	Title	Length
1.	"Voices of the Air"	2:55
2.	"The Ultimate Disaster: I. Won't You Keep Us Working?; II. First Warning; III. Back to Normality?; IV. The Sky Falls!; V. Why are We Crying?; VI. The Tunnels are Filling; VII. It Never Stops"	8:54
3.	"Migration: I. March to the Sea; II. The Observer; III. Hole-Worker's New Hymn"	7:15
Total length:		19:38

Side two - "Hole Workers vs Man and Machine"
No.	Title	Length
4.	"Another Land: I. Rumors; II. Arrival; III. Deployment; IV. Saturation"	4:42
5.	"The New Machine: I. Idea; II. Construction; III. Failure/Reconstruction; IV. Success"	7:16
6.	"Final Confrontation: I. Driving the Moles Away; II. Don't Tread on Me; III. The Short War; IV. Resolution?"	9:47
Total length:		22:24

=== 1988 CD bonus tracks ===
Tracks 7–11 are taken from the 1982 EP Intermission, which collected the intermission music that was played from tape between acts of the Mole Show.

No.	Title	Length
7.	"Lights Out (Prelude)"	5:55
8.	"Shorty's Lament (Intermission)"	6:43
9.	"The Moles are Coming (Intermission)"	2:56
10.	"Would We Be Alive? (Intermission)"	5:09
11.	"The New Hymn (Recessional)"	4:20
Total length:		1:05:52

=== 2019 pREServed edition (Mole Box) ===
A deluxe box set pertaining to the entire Mole Trilogy concept was released in 2019. It contained newly remastered editions of Mark of the Mole, The Tunes of Two Cities and The Big Bubble, as well as recordings of the Mole Show and a sixth disc of miscellaneous recordings related to the project. Discs One and Six are shown here for their relevance.

Disc one – Mark of the Mole
No.	Title	Length
1.	"Voices of the Air"	2:55
2.	"The Ultimate Disaster"	8:54
3.	"Migration"	7:15
4.	"Another Land"	4:42
5.	"The New Machine"	7:16
6.	"Final Confrontation"	9:47
7.	"Voices of the Air" (Res Dance '82 – live in the studio)	3:13
8.	"The Ultimate Disaster" (Res Dance '82 – live in the studio)	4:50
9.	"Migration" (Res Dance '82 – live in the studio)	7:43
10.	"Another Land / The New Machine" (Res Dance '82 – live in the studio)	11:24
11.	"Final Confrontation" (Res Dance '82 – live in the studio)	8:19
Total length:		75:78

Disc six – Miscellaneous Mole Materials
No.	Title	Writer(s)	Length
1.	"MOTM Mix One Concentrate"		25:41
2.	"Lights Out"		5:55
3.	"Shorty's Lament"		6:43
4.	"The Moles are Coming"		2:56
5.	"Would We Be Alive?"		5:09
6.	"The New Hymn"		4:20
7.	"Another Another Land"		3:34
8.	"Now It Is Too Late"		1:59
9.	"Going Nowhere"		2:05
10.	"From MOM1"		1:06
11.	"Satisfaction" (Res Dance '82 – live in the studio)	Mick Jagger / Keith Richards	3:17
12.	"Marching to the We"		5:16
13.	"Would We Be Alive?" (live 2005)		4:12
14.	"Marching to the Sea / Intermission" (live 2013)		5:18
Total length:			77:31
