= The Tunes of Two Cities =

Studio album by The Residents
- Released: March 1982
- Recorded: October 1980–January 1982
- Length: 39:50
- Label: Ralph
- Producer: The Cryptic Corporation

The Residents chronology
Mark of the Mole (1981)	The Tunes of Two Cities (1982)	Title In Limbo (1983)

Professional ratings
Review scores
Source	Rating
AllMusic	3/5 stars

The Tunes of Two Cities is the ninth studio album by American art rock group The Residents, released in 1982. It is part two of the Mole Trilogy. Rather than forwarding the story of the battle between the Mole People and the Chubs, the record's concept is to display the differences between the two cultures through their music. The music of the Chubs is light cocktail jazz, while that of the Moles tends toward industrial hymns. A major feature of this album is that it was one of the first to use the E-mu Emulator, one of the earliest commercial digital samplers.

The Chub track "Mousetrap" bears a noticeable resemblance to Stan Kenton's "Eager Beaver". In one 1998 interview, band spokesman Homer Flynn acknowledged that the band listened to jazz and big band artists including Kenton, as well as Charles Mingus and Sun Ra.

== Track listing ==
All tracks are written by The Residents.

Side one
No.	Title	Length
1.	"Serenade for Missy"	3:16
2.	"A Maze of Jigsaws"	2:52
3.	"Mousetrap"	3:32
4.	"God of Darkness"	3:18
5.	"Smack Your Lips (Clap Your Teeth)"	3:59
6.	"Praise for the Curse"	2:52
Total length:		19:56

Side two
No.	Title	Length
7.	"The Secret Seed"	2:47
8.	"Smokebeams"	2:43
9.	"Mourning the Undead"	3:05
10.	"Song of the Wild"	3:24
11.	"The Evil Disposer"	3:16
12.	"Happy Home (excerpt from Act II of "Innisfree")"	4:46
Total length:		20:32

The 1988 CD release contains three extra tracks that were excluded from the album due to space constraints. These tracks are sequenced between "Praise for the Curse" and "The Secret Seed", restoring the alternation between "Mole" and "Chub" songs.

- Open Up – 2:18
- Anvil Forest – 2:22
- Scent of Mint – 2:27

=== 2019 pREServed edition (Mole Box) ===
A deluxe box set pertaining to the entire Mole Trilogy concept was released in 2019. It contained newly remastered editions of Mark of the Mole, The Tunes of Two Cities and The Big Bubble, as well as recordings of the Mole Show and a sixth disc of miscellaneous recordings related to the project. Disc Two is shown here for its relevance.

Disc two – The Tunes of Two Cities
No.	Title	Length
1.	"Serenade for Missy"	3:16
2.	"A Maze of Jigsaws"	2:52
3.	"Mousetrap"	3:32
4.	"God of Darkness"	3:18
5.	"Smack Your Lips (Clap Your Teeth)"	3:59
6.	"Praise for the Curse"	2:52
7.	"The Secret Seed"	2:47
8.	"Smokebeams"	2:43
9.	"Mourning the Undead"	3:05
10.	"Song of the Wild"	3:24
11.	"The Evil Disposer"	3:16
12.	"Happy Home (excerpt from Act II of "Innisfree")"	4:51
13.	"Open Up"	2:18
14.	"Anvil Forest"	2:22
15.	"Scent of Mint"	2:27
16.	"Smack Your Lips" (1982 rehearsal)	4:03
17.	"Song of the Wild" (1982 rehearsal)	3:32
18.	"Happy Home" (1982 rehearsal)	2:14
19.	"God of Darkness" (Res Dance '82 – live in the studio)	3:07
20.	"Smack Your Lips" (Res Dance '82 – live in the studio)	4:52
21.	"The Secret Seed" (Res Dance '82 – live in the studio)	2:50
22.	"Happy Home" (Res Dance '82 – live in the studio)	3:35
Total length:		71:15

== Personnel ==
The Residents: Performance

Snakefinger: Guitar

Nessie Lessons: Vocals

Norman Salant: Saxophone
