= Z'EV =

American percussionist

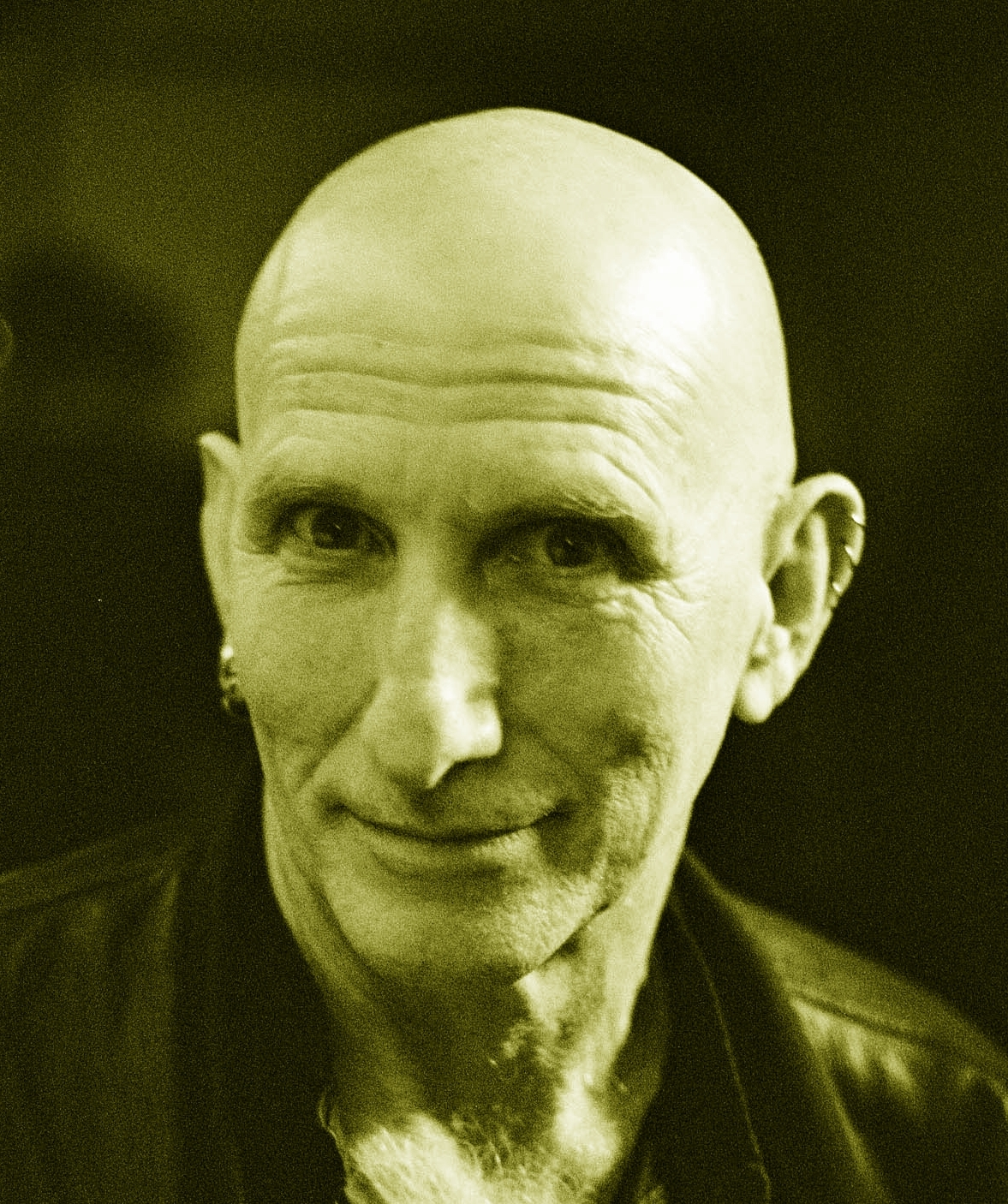
- Z'EV in 2008

Background information
- Born: Stefan Joel Weisser; February 8, 1951; Los Angeles, California, U.S.
- Died: December 16, 2017 (aged 66) Chicago, Illinois, U.S.
- Genres: Industrial
- Occupations: Poet; sound artist
- Instruments: Found objects; percussion
- Years active: 1966–2017
- Labels: Touch; Cold Spring; Soleilmoon
- Website: www.rhythmajik.com

Z'EV (born Stefan Joel Weisser, February 8, 1951 – December 16, 2017) was an American poet, percussionist, and sound artist. After studying various world music traditions at CalArts, he began creating his own percussion sounds out of industrial materials for a variety of independent and underground record labels. He is regarded as a pioneer of industrial music.

In 1983, critic Roy Sablosky wrote: "Z'EV doesn't just break the rules, he changes them." Journalist Louis Morra wrote in 1983: "Z'EV is a consummate example of contemporary performance art, as well as modern composition and theater." and, "Z'EV realizes many of modernist art's ultimate goals: primitivism, improvisation, multi-media/conjunction of art forms, the artist as direct creator."

His work with text and sound was influenced by Kabbalah, as well as African, Afro-Caribbean and Indonesian music and culture. He studied Ewe music, Balinese gamelan, and Indian tala.

== Career ==
From 1959 to 1965, he studied drumming with Arnie Frank, then Chuck Flores and then Art Anton at Drum City in Van Nuys, California.

In 1963, he abandoned Judaism and began his lifelong relationship with world religions and esoteric systems.

From 1966 to 1969, he performed in a jazz rock band with electronic composer Carl Stone and James Stewart. After auditioning for Frank Zappa's Bizarre Records, the band ceased activities and both he and Stone began attending the California Institute of the Arts.

After studying at CalArts from 1969 to 1970, he began producing works using the name S. Weisser, primarily concentrating on visual and sound poetries.

In 1975, he was included in the "Second Generation" show at the Museum of Conceptual Art in San Francisco. In 1974, he also became a member of Cellar-M, a musical project of Naut Humon, Will E. Jackson, and Rex Probe. He would continue to work with Humon on various projects until 1988, appearing on the Rhythm & Noise album Chasms Accord, released on The Residents' Ralph Records in 1985.

In 1976 he moved from Los Angeles to the Bay Area. A primary reason for this move was his association with the San Francisco alternative exhibition space La Mamelle, run by Carl Loeffler. He also formed the band TO, an offshoot of Cellar-M, with musician and activist Will E. Jackson (playing the Serge Modular System), which occasionally also performed under the name Center for Interspecies Communication. Together they self-published one album in 1976. TO's commitment to developing the world's knowledge of cetaceans and their preservation would lead them to hold awareness concerts from California to Japan, performing at the Harumi Dome in Tokyo in April 1977 for Japan Celebrates the Whale & Dolphin – the Seas Must Live event organized by The Dolphin Project, alongside Jackson Browne, Fred Neil, Country Joe McDonald, Paul Winter, Terry Reid, Richie Havens, Odetta, and others.

In 1977, he presented his first solo percussion performance at La Mamelle under the project title 'Sound of Wind and Limb'.

In 1978 he began developing an idiosyncratic performance technique utilizing self-developed instruments formed from industrial materials such as stainless steel, titanium, and PVC plastics. Initially these instruments were assemblages of these materials, used with a movement-based performance style that was a form of marionette, although with the performer visible. He has since come to refer to this performance mode as 'wild-style', a term originally related to graffiti. At this time, he first began to perform outside of the fine art context, initially at the Mabuhay Gardens in San Francisco.

In the fall of 1978, he began performing under the name Z'EV, which comes from the Hebrew name his parents gave him at birth (Sh'aul Z'ev bn Yakov bn Moshe bn Sha'ul).

In November and December 1980, Z'EV opened a series of UK and European concerts in the first headlining tour of the British group Bauhaus. On that tour, and his first solo tour of Europe immediately afterwards, Z'EV introduced intense metal based percussion musics to the UK and Europe. Critic Jason Pettigrew (former editor-in-chief of Alternative Press magazine) attests to Z'EV's pioneering use of metal found object as percussion, writing: "Consider your music collection. Neubauten? Test Department? Z'EV's been there first.'

In 1981, 'Shake Rattle & Roll', a VHS video documenting his first wild-style performance on the East coast (produced by video artist Jon Child), was released by Fetish Records in the UK and was the first 'music' / art video to be commercially released. In 1982 he worked with Glenn Branca for Branca's Symphony No. 2 in which Z'EV had a solo segment swinging with metal can overhead, and rattling chains and sheets of steel. After 1984, he concentrated on performing in a more traditional mallet-percussion style, albeit with highly idiosyncratic and "extended" mallet percussion techniques and his self-made or adapted instruments. In point of fact, Z'EV doesn't actually consider the results as "music" per se, but more as orchestrations of highly rhythmic acoustic phenomena. In 1982, he also appeared on the Factrix and Monte Cazazza collaborative album California Babylon.

Z'EV was a strong presence in the New York City downtown music scene in the 1980s and 1990s, performing with Elliott Sharp, Glenn Branca, and doing solo performances at The Kitchen, The Knitting Factory, Danceteria, and other venues where experimental music flourished.

From 1986 to 1990, he was a Guest Teacher in Composition and Improvisation at the Theater School for New Dance Development in Amsterdam. With dancer Ria Higler, he mentored a group through their entire four-year course of study.

In the mid-1990s, he began working with Amsterdam house musician, DJ Dano. Their work, also in conjunction with Austrian media artist Konrad Becker, was influential within the gabber, hardcore and Thunderdome music scenes. Throughout the decade he also collaborated with Lydia Lunch, Psychic TV, and Genesis P-Orridge.

In the 2000s and 2010s, Z'EV worked and recorded with a wide range of musicians and composers, including Faust, Stephen O'Malley, The Hafler Trio, Organum, Chris Watson, Francisco López, B. J. Nilsen, Peter Rehberg, Oren Ambarchi, Merzbow, Marc Hurtado, John Duncan, Charlemagne Palestine, Illusion of Safety, Sudden Infant, Edward Ka-Spel, and many others.

His recordings have been released by C.I.P., Cold Spring, Die Stadt, Soleilmoon, Tzadik Records, Subterranean, Sub Rosa, Important Records, Atavistic, Editions Mego, and Touch.

== Later life and death ==
Z'EV was severely injured in the 2016 Cimarron train derailment which took place near Dodge City, Kansas on March 14, 2016. After this accident he continued to have health problems but never stopped working. A crowdfunding was set up to pay for medical treatments. He lived for three months in the guest room of his friend Boyd Rice in Southern California. Afterwards, Z'EV traveled to Europe and was an artist in residence at the Porto-based sound lab Sonoscopia, where he built a number of percussion instruments. One of his last performances took place in an Amsterdam Synagogue.

Z'EV suffered from chronic obstructive pulmonary disease and died on December 16, 2017, in Chicago from pulmonary failure.

== Published works ==
- Wheels On Fire #'s 1 And 2
- Rhythmajik, Practical Uses of Number, Rhythm and Sound
- Face the Wound
- The Sapphire Nature
