= The Big Bubble =

Studio album by the Residents
- Released: October 1985
- Recorded: 1985
- Genres: Rock, avant-garde
- Length: 37:41
- Labels: Ralph, Wave
- Producer: The Cryptic Corporation

The Residents chronology
George & James (1984)	The Big Bubble (1985)	The Eyeball Show (1986)

The Big Bubble is the thirteenth studio album by the American art rock group the Residents, released in 1985. The album is presented as the debut record of fictional garage rock band "the Big Bubble", composed of four "Cross" band members – "Cross" being the resulting mixture between the Mole Trilogy's two contrasting factions, the Moles and the Chubs.

The album was subtitled Part Four of the Mole Trilogy – it was decided to extend the trilogy into a hexalogy, in which odd-numbered parts would detail the plot while even-numbered parts would elaborate on the cultural aspect of the two warring factions in the story. However, The Big Bubble was the last finished work related to the project before it was cancelled due to sheer disinterest and focus on other projects.

== Music ==
The music on The Big Bubble is designed for a garage rock setting – instrumentation consists of guitars, drums, vocals and keyboards – and most of the album's lyrics are gibberish, presented as "the forbidden language of the Mohelmot" (one of the two races involved in the story). Vocals were recorded before the instruments to achieve a "live" sound.

== Artwork ==
The album cover of The Big Bubble is actually presented "inside" another cover – it's implied that the album is actually titled Part Four of the Mole Trilogy, while presenting the cover for the self-titled album of a fictional band called the Big Bubble. In similar fashion, the album's back cover shows the fictional album's back cover, and the gatefold spread shows the fictional album's gatefold spread. The same applies for the record labels (the fictional album is published by "Black Shroud" Records).

The fictional album's front cover generated attention due to its showing of four unmasked band members – it was rumored that these band members were, in fact, the Residents. However, the Cryptic Corporation later confirmed that the four were just models who had responded to an ad. The group's frontman was portrayed by Kyle Newell, who would go on to be a stage technician for the 13th Anniversary Show. Another of the members had come abroad from Europe, where he was first spotted in the audience at a Residents concert.

== Reception ==
Professional ratings
Review scores
Source	Rating
AllMusic	3/5 stars

The Big Bubble is one of the Residents' most polarizing albums. Critical reception was heavily mixed. While writer Cole Gagne, in his book Sonic Transports, considers the album "brilliant," writer Ian Shirley says in his book Meet the Residents that the album was "treading water." Spin said, "The Big Bubble, strangely enough, bears the usual Residents signatures: sludgy synthesizer threnodies pump underneath garbled vocals sung by what sounds like an inbred Louisiana lumberjack. Pure genius, so to speak."

Despite this, the album was surprisingly successful in Japan, where it was being distributed by Wave Records. As a result, Wave requested that the Residents perform in Tokyo, proposing to cover all expenses. This performance was developed into the 13th Anniversary Show which eventually also toured Europe, Australia and the United States.

== Track listing ==
All tracks written by the Residents.

The fictional sleeve lists all songs as written by Frank Leone (guitarist) and Ramsey Whiten (drummer/singer), except "Fear for the Future", written by Paul Sage (keyboardist).

Side one
No.	Title	Length
1.	"Sorry"	3:35
2.	"Hop a Little"	2:44
3.	"Go Where Ya Wanna Go"	2:35
4.	"Gotta Gotta Get"	4:21
5.	"Cry for the Fire"	5:49
Total length:		19:04

Side two
No.	Title	Length
6.	"Die-Stay-Go"	2:58
7.	"Vinegar"	2:20
8.	"Firefly"	2:14
9.	"The Big Bubble"	2:13
10.	"Fear for the Future"	3:52
11.	"Kula Bocca Says So"	5:00
Total length:		18:37

1989 CD bonus tracks
No.	Title	Length
12.	"Safety is the Cootie Wootie, pt. 1 – Prelude for a Toddler"	3:38
13.	"Safety is the Cootie Wootie, pt. 2 – Toddler's Lullaby"	2:30
14.	"Safety is the Cootie Wootie, pt. 3 – Safety is the Cootie Wootie"	4:11
Total length:		48:00

=== 2019 pREServed edition (Mole Box) ===
A deluxe box set pertaining to the entire Mole Trilogy concept was released in 2019. It contained newly remastered editions of Mark of the Mole, The Tunes of Two Cities and The Big Bubble, as well as recordings of the Mole Show and a sixth disc of miscellaneous recordings related to the project. Disc Three is shown here for its relevance.

Disc three – The Big Bubble
No.	Title	Length
1.	"Sorry"	3:37
2.	"Hop a Little"	2:47
3.	"Go Where Ya Wanna Go"	2:38
4.	"Gotta Gotta Get"	4:23
5.	"Cry for the Fire"	5:53
6.	"Die-Stay-Go"	3:00
7.	"Vinegar"	2:22
8.	"Firefly"	2:16
9.	"The Big Bubble"	2:15
10.	"Fear for the Future"	3:54
11.	"Kula Bocca Says So"	5:11
12.	"Jingle Bells"	2:42
13.	"Untitled"	4:08
14.	"Kula Bocca" (2-track demo)	2:10
15.	"Die-Stay-Go" (2-track demo)	1:46
16.	"Cry for the Fire sketch"	1:04
17.	"The Big Bubble" (live 1986)	2:23
18.	"Hop a Little" (live 1986)	3:13
19.	"Cry for the Fire" (live on Norge TV NRK)	7:09
20.	"Die-Stay-Go" (live in San Francisco, 2011)	4:45
Total length:		67:36

== Personnel ==
=== As listed on the Residents sleeve ===
- The Residents – performance
- Raoul N. Di Seimbote – backing vocals
- Brian Seff – backing vocals
- Ray Hanna – backing vocals

=== As listed on the Big Bubble sleeve ===
- Frank Leone – electric guitar, backing vocals
- Ramsey Whiten – lead vocals, percussion
- Paul Sage – grand piano, string synthesizer, backing vocals
- Alex Beason – electric guitar, backing vocals
