= Meet the Residents =

Studio album by the Residents
- Released: April 1, 1974
- Recorded: February–October 1973
- Genre: Experimental
- Length: 44:25
- Label: Ralph
- Producer: The Residents

The Residents chronology
Santa Dog (1972)	Meet the Residents (1974)	The Third Reich 'n Roll (1976)

1977 reprint cover

Meet the Residents is the debut studio album by American experimental rock band the Residents, released on April 1, 1974, through Ralph Records. Most of the album was recorded throughout 1973 during breaks from production on Vileness Fats, the group's film project and main focus at the time. The album is said to adhere to N. Senada's "Theory of Phonetic Organization," in which music composition should be based on individual sounds rather than traditional musical notes.

== Music ==
The music on Meet the Residents is a mixture of several Western genres, including blues, jazz, opera and classical music, performed in an amateurish manner, deliberately or otherwise. The album features much of what came to be the Residents' trademark sound for most of the 1970s, with loud horns, odd time signatures and cartoonish vocals.

The first six tracks on the album segue into each other to form a sort of suite, starting with a skeletal cover of Nancy Sinatra's "These Boots are Made for Walkin'" before transitioning into a medley of piano melodies, Dadaist lyrics and oddly-timed percussion, ending in "Smelly Tongues", one of the group's better known songs.

The rest of the album is composed of longer, more developed compositions (with the exception of the short "Skratz"). Tracks like "Rest Aria" and "Spotted Pinto Bean" are structured in a classical manner, with grand piano backdrops, horns, sound effects and operatic vocals.

Meanwhile, the second side of the album consists of more percussion-based mostly instrumental compositions, particularly the track "N-ER-GEE (Crisis Blues)", the longest track on the album, a suite which at one point notably samples and loops the Human Beinz single "Nobody but Me" (around the word "boogaloo") and builds increasingly chaotic music around it.

== Artwork ==
The design of Meet the Residents, as well as its title, is a direct parody of the Beatles' 1964 Capitol Records debut and third US release, Meet the Beatles. The front cover features all four Beatles cartoonishly defaced, while the back cover is formatted identically to the original, substituting the sleeve notes, track listing, album and publishing credits, and crawfish heads and claws are drawn over the original Beatles band photo (except for Ringo Starr, whose head is replaced by a starfish). The band members are subsequently credited as "John Crawfish", "George Crawfish", "Paul McCrawfish", and "Ringo Starfish".

The cover allegedly drew the attention of Capitol Records, who threatened legal action if the cover were not changed. In response, the Residents pressed a stereo edit of the album with new artwork, swapping the defaced and "crawfish" photos around, so that the "crawfish" photo was now the front cover. It is unknown if the threat of legal action from Capitol was actually real, given that all subsequent re-releases of the album have again featured the original 1974 artwork.

== Recording ==
Meet the Residents was recorded from February to October 1973 during breaks from the filming of their long-running project, Vileness Fats. The sessions took place at 'El Ralpho Studios', a home studio owned by the group which was located on Sycamore Street in San Francisco. Rather than the traditional method of writing, rehearsing and recording a song, the Residents constructed their songs entirely on tape, building up through overdubs. During the early sessions the group had no plans to release the material, but throughout the course of the sessions it evolved into a structured album.

== Release ==
In February 1974, in order to promote the upcoming LP, the Residents pressed a six-minute edit of the album onto 4,000 single-sided 8" flexi discs, which were given away for free with Canadian art magazine FILE, and San Francisco magazine Friday. Due to the satirical nature of the cover, most readers interpreted it as a joke, which hindered already-low album sales: reportedly only 40 copies of 1050 were sold within the year, with most being returned to the publisher unopened. The album was released on April 1, 1974, six months after recording was completed. It was released by Ralph Records, a label formed two years earlier to release the Santa Dog EP, which featured anonymous contributions from some of the Residents.

Homer Flynn, the group's spokesperson, later recalled that the group's first three albums were hard to find in the 1970s, and that the Residents' homes were filled with boxes of unsold records. By 1977, Ralph had sold out of all 850 original pressings of the album, and so, the Cryptic Corporation (Hardy Fox, Homer Flynn, Jay Clem & John Kennedy), who had obtained ownership of the Residents' master recordings the year prior, released an abridged stereo version of the album created at Grove Street Studios, where they and the Residents had relocated to.

== Critical reception and legacy ==
Professional ratings
Review scores
Source	Rating
AllMusic	4/5 stars
eMusic	4/5 stars
Encyclopedia of Popular Music	4/5 stars
The Great Rock Discography	7/10
MusicHound Rock	4/5
The Rolling Stone Album Guide	3.5/5 stars
Sounds	5/5 stars
Spin Alternative Record Guide	8/10

Although Meet the Residents was largely ignored at the time of its release, it has since garnered critical acclaim after a favourable review in a 1977 issue of Sounds, which described initially listening to the album as incomprehensible and alien, but said it becomes enjoyable after multiple listens. David Cleary of AllMusic called the band "true avant-garde crazies...[their] work of this time really sounds like nothing else that exists." Nils Bernstein of eMusic gave the album 4 stars, saying its "brilliance lies in collaging less avant-garde elements like vaudeville, early rock ‘n’ roll, world music and snippets of pop culture in "songs" that were as disorienting as the barrage of media and consumerism they subtly critiqued – the medium is the message, indeed." In a positive review, Julian Cope said of the album "just as DJ's would play the best minute and a half or so the latest garage, soul or pop hits before fading it out into another great single before the listener gets bored, the Residents weld together a collage of the most annoyingly catchy riffs and tunes leaving the listener initially confused and later hooked."

== Track listing ==
All tracks are written by the Residents, except where noted.

Side one
No.	Title	Writer(s)	Length
1.	"Boots"	Lee Hazlewood	1:30
2.	"Numb Erone"		1:23
3.	"Guylum Bardot"		1:22
4.	"Breath and Length"		1:45
5.	"Consuelo's Departure"		1:55
6.	"Smelly Tongues"		1:35
7.	"Rest Aria"		5:41
8.	"Skratz"		1:18
9.	"Spotted Pinto Bean"		6:37
Total length:			23:06

Side two
No.	Title	Writer(s)	Length
10.	"Infant Tango"		6:01
11.	"Seasoned Greetings"		5:12
12.	"N-ER-GEE (A Crisis Bluesuite)"	The Residents; Ronald Isley; Rudolph Isley; O'Kelly Isley, Jr.	10:06
Total length:			21:19 44:25

=== 1977 stereo remix ===
Side one
No.	Title	Writer(s)	Length
1.	"Boots"	Lee Hazlewood	0:53
2.	"Numb Erone"		1:07
3.	"Guylum Bardot"		1:21
4.	"Breath and Length"		1:42
5.	"Consuelo's Departure"		0:59
6.	"Smelly Tongues"		1:47
7.	"Rest Aria"		5:09
8.	"Skratz"		1:42
9.	"Spotted Pinto Bean"		5:27
Total length:			20:07

Side two
No.	Title	Writer(s)	Length
10.	"Infant Tango"		5:27
11.	"Seasoned Greetings"		5:13
12.	"N-ER-GEE (Crisis Blues)"	The Residents; Ronald Isley; Rudolph Isley; O'Kelly Isley, Jr.	7:16
Total length:			17:56 38:03

=== Bonus tracks ===
1988 CD
No.	Title	Length
13.	"Fire"	1:43
14.	"Lightning"	2:15
15.	"Explosion"	3:17
16.	"Aircraft Damage"	3:45

2009 Japanese CD
No.	Title	Length
17.	"Santa Dog '78"	1:53
18.	"Santa Dog '88"	5:16
19.	"Where Are Your Dogs? Show Us Your Ugly!" (Santa Dog '92)	12:50

=== 2018 pREServed edition ===
Disc one
No.	Title	Writer(s)	Length
1.	"Boots"	Lee Hazlewood	1:26
2.	"Numb Erone"		1:21
3.	"Guylum Bardot"		1:23
4.	"Breath and Length"		1:45
5.	"Consuelo's Departure"		1:47
6.	"Smelly Tongues"		1:51
7.	"Rest Aria"		5:29
8.	"Skratz"		1:49
9.	"Spotted Pinto Bean"		6:46
10.	"Infant Tango"		6:06
11.	"Seasoned Greetings"		5:13
12.	"N-ER-GEE (Crisis Blues)"	The Residents; Ronald Isley; Rudolph Isley; O'Kelly Isley, Jr.	10:20
13.	"Fire"		1:47
14.	"Explosion"		3:23
15.	"Lightning"		2:21
16.	"Aircraft Damage"		3:57
17.	"Tuesday #1 / Guylum Bardot version"		2:25
18.	"Boots Again"	The Residents, Lee Hazlewood	2:04
19.	"Numb Erone / Inka"		2:54
20.	"Tuesday #2 / Smelly Tongues version"		2:07
21.	"Consuelo's Return"		2:23
22.	"Breath and Length version"		2:04
23.	"Numb Erone 'Live'"		2:20
24.	"Spotted Pinto Bean / Tuesday #5"		1:59
25.	"7733 Variations"		1:18
Total length:			76:15

Disc two
No.	Title	Writer(s)	Length
1.	"Boots"	Lee Hazlewood	0:51
2.	"Numb Erone"		1:09
3.	"Guylum Bardot"		1:21
4.	"Breath and Length"		1:41
5.	"Consuelo's Departure"		0:59
6.	"Smelly Tongues"		1:46
7.	"Rest Aria"		5:14
8.	"Skratz"		1:43
9.	"Spotted Pinto Bean"		5:31
10.	"Infant Tango"		5:26
11.	"Seasoned Greetings"		5:07
12.	"N-ER-GEE (Crisis Blues)"	The Residents; Ronald Isley; Rudolph Isley; O'Kelly Isley, Jr.	7:50
13.	"Overlay at High Speed"		0:44
14.	"Spotted Pinto Queen"		3:00
15.	"Inka Don't Dry"		3:08
16.	"Tuesday #3"		1:04
17.	"Quick Brain Tuesday"		0:45
18.	"Poisoned Popcorn"		2:46
19.	"N-ER-GEE Crisis Outro"		0:55
20.	"1-10 (with a Touch of 11) pt. 1"		5:09
21.	"1-10 (with a Touch of 11) pt. 4"		4:00
22.	"1-10 (with a Touch of 11) pt. 5"		1:38
23.	"1-10 (with a Touch of 11) pt. 6"		3:29
24.	"1-10 (with a Touch of 11) pt. 7"		1:54
25.	"1-10 (with a Touch of 11) pt. 8"		2:33
Total length:			69:30

== Personnel ==
=== The Residents ===
- The Residents - all other instruments, vocals

=== Guest Musicians ===
- Wool - vocals ("Smelly Tongues")
- Ruth Essex - vocals ("Breath and Length")
- James Whitaker - piano ("Spotted Pinto Bean")
- Pamela Wieking - vocals ("Spotted Pinto Bean")
- Philip Friehofner - oboe ("Spotted Pinto Bean")
- James Aaron - bass, guitar ("Infant Tango")
- Bobby Tangney - bass ("Infant Tango")

=== Technical ===
- Producer - Residents, Uninc.
- Cover Designed by - Porno/Graphics
  - Based on a photo by Robert Freeman
