= Naut Humon =

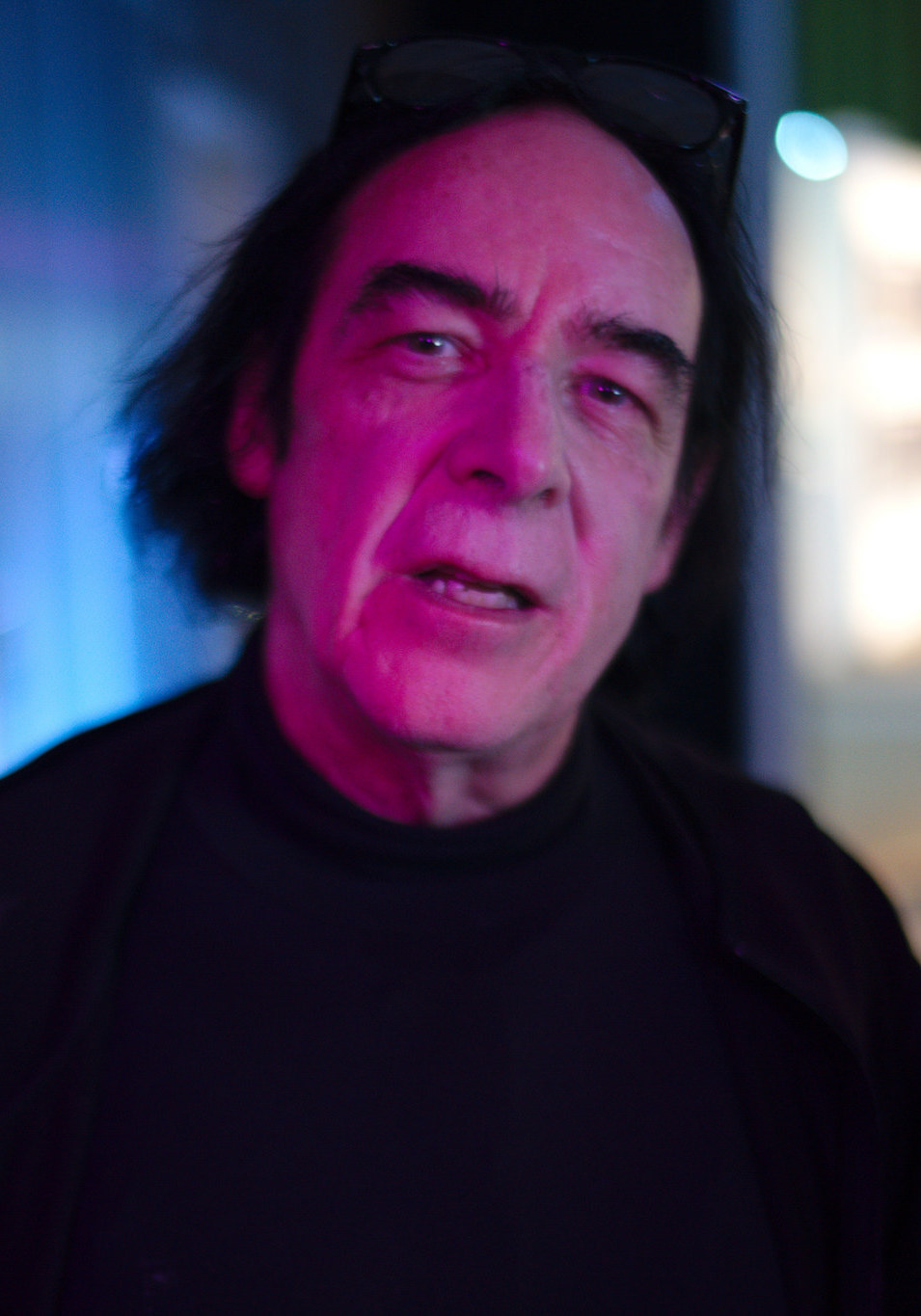

Background information
- Born: Seattle
- Genres: Electronic music; Minimal techno; Techno; Experimental music
- Occupations: director; composer; songwriter; musician; record producer; artist; writer; performer; curator
- Instruments: keyboards; synthesizer
- Labels: Asphodel Records; Recombinant Media Labs
- Website: www.rml-cinechamber.org

Naut Humon is a San Francisco-based composer, curator, performer, and leader in experimental electronic music and audiovisual projects such as Rhythm & Noise and Sound Traffic Control. He is the Founder and artistic director of Recombinant Media Labs (RML) and its internationally touring project RML CineChamber.

== Biography ==
Humon began his career in the arts as a child actor in Seattle. Cellar-M was a musical project of Humon, percussionist Z'EV took part in this project. He eventually moved to San Francisco in the early 70's to stage underground performances that operated outside of the traditional theater.

Humon is a founding member of the experimental music ensemble Rhythm & Noise, who released two albums on Ralph Records. Humon has also worked with avant-garde vocalist and composer Diamanda Galás, providing samples for her album The Divine Punishment, as well as percussionist Z'EV. He has served on the Digital Musics jury of the Ars Electronica festival in Linz, Austria every year and is the founder of Recombinant Media Labs and was head of A&R for Asphodel Records, both based in San Francisco. He is featured in the 2001 documentary film Scratch.

== Asphodel Records ==
Humon is well known as co-founder of Asphodel Records and working with early artists in electronic and ambient music. Artists included Ann Magnuson, Christian Marclay, Curtis Roads, DJ Spooky, Iannis Xenakis, Invisibl Skratch Piklz, John Cage, Mix Master Mike, Richard Devine, Robert Rich, Ryuichi Sakamoto, and the X-Ecutioners.

== Recombinant Media Labs ==
In 1991 Humon founded Recombinant Media Labs ("RML").

In 2012 he was the artistic director behind the 360 degree surround audio and visual CineChamber, an art installation put on at MUTEK. The CineChamber commissioned important pieces by Alva Noto and Blixa Bargeld, Ryoji Ikeda, Maryanne Amacher, Christian Fennesz, Biosphere, Ryoichi Kurokawa, Speedy J & Scott Pagano, Chris Watson, Thomas Brinkmann, Monolake, Pan Sonic, Poie, Matmos, Rrose, and Christian Marclay.

== Recombinant Festival ==
In 2016, Humon and RML created the first festival Recombinant Festival with a permanent home in San Francisco's Gray Area Foundation for the Arts. From September 26, 2016, until October 2, 2016, artists pieces performed include Maryanne Amacher, Scott Arford, Tarik Barri, Biosphere, Jefre Cantu-Ledesma, Paul Clipson, Cut Hands, Christian Fennesz, Robert Henke, Kurt Hentschläger, Ryoichi Kurokawa, Ulf Langheinrich, Lillevan, Egbert Mittelstadt, Scott Pagano, Jochem Papp, Markus Popp aka Oval, Semiconductor, and Masako Tanaka.

In 2017, the Recombinant Festival selected a theme, "The Fall of Love: Paradise Tossed" and took place from October 11, 2017, until October 15, 2017. Key pieces were performed by Martin Rev, Divine Enfant, People Like Us, Makino Takashi, Karl Lemieux, Michaela Grill, Philip Jeck, Grouper, Paul Clipson, Masako Tanaka, Daniel Menche, Craig Baldwin, Jeff Carey, Pedestrian Deposit, Ryoichi Kurokawa, Scott Arford, Biosphere, Egbert Mittelstadt, Lillevan, Christian Fennesz, Mark McCloud, Neha Spellfish, Layne, and Humon.

In 2018, the Recombinant Festival took place from November 27 to December 2, 2018, with Herman Koglen as the key performer, who also created a set of three videos released on social media announcing the event.

The 2020 edition of Recombinant Festival was themed "Clouds of Confinement" and featured a 360-degree surround cinema experience and performances from artists including 404.zero, Ryoichi Kurokawa, Christian Fennesz and Byetone.

== See also ==
- Asphodel Records
