= Ralph Records =

Independent record label active between 1972 and 1989

Ralph Records was an American independent record label active between 1972 and 1989, best known for being initially run by avant-garde art collective the Residents. The name arose from the slang phrase for vomiting "calling Ralph on the porcelain telephone".

Ralph was founded in 1972, shortly after the Residents had moved to San Francisco, when they realized that it was the only entity willing to publish their work. They "unincorporated" themselves as the Residents Uninc. and managed the new company under that name. One of the group's members could draw, so they gave the company a graphic design wing called Porno Graphics, a.k.a. Pore-Know Graphics, a.k.a. Poor No Graphics, a.k.a. Porneaugraphics, etc., and the whole operation was run out of their new two-story building at 18 Sycamore St. in the Mission District. The band named its studio El Ralpho, spoofing Sun Ra who had named his El Saturn.

Ralph's first release was December 1972's Santa Dog (RR-1272), a two-disc single that was mailed out free to about three hundred people—friends, radio stations, and even Richard Nixon and Frank Zappa were sent copies (though Zappa's was returned—he had moved). This was followed by the band's first album, Meet the Residents (RR-0274), which was recorded in 1973 and released in 1974. The band had trouble with distribution and made up 4,000 seven-minute flexi-disks based on the album with which to promote it. The flexi was included in the February 1974 issue of File, a Canadian art magazine.

Over the years Ralph moved to other artists besides the Residents. The first was Schwump, a friend from Portland, Oregon, who in 1976 released a single called "Aphids in the Hall" (RRX-0776). The Residents' best friend and guitarist, Snakefinger, released a single called "The Spot" (RR-7802) in 1978 and went on to release four albums.

Ralph's slogan Buy Or Die! was used as the title of its semiannual mail order catalogs, as well as its sampler 7-inch EPs. Four of the "Buy or Die!" EPs had cover art by Gary Panter.

In 1976, the Cryptic Corporation took over control of Ralph Records and maintained it until 1985, when it handed it over to sales manager Tom Timony. The Residents left the label in 1987, after which Timony ran it under license and folded it into his label, TEC Tones, until reverting control to Ralph in 1992. Ralph Records has not really operated since 1987. Since 1992, it has operated as EuroRalphAmerica, the Residents' mail-order company.

In August 2010 Ralph Records announced its closing "due to the general state of the music business and the expanding cost of creating physical products. It's been a great ride. Thanks for all your support over the past 11 years". Notices were sent on Twitter saying that it would sell out its stock of various limited Residents releases and have a sale on all the other items offered online.

== Artists who released records on Ralph ==
- Art Bears (2 releases)
- Big City Orchestra (1)
- Eugene Chadbourne (1)
- Chrome (only 3 tracks on Subterranean Modern compilation)
- Club Foot Orchestra (2)
- Freshly Wrapped Candies (1)
- Fred Frith (4)
- Frank Harris and Maria Marquez (1)
- King Kurt (1)
- MX-80 Sound (5)
- Nash the Slash (1)
- Michael Perilstein (1)
- Renaldo and the Loaf (4)
- The Residents (31)
- Rhythm & Noise (2)
- Schwump (1)
- Snakefinger (11)
- Bill Spooner (1)
- Suckdog (1)
- Hajime Tachibana (1)
- Tuxedomoon (7)
- Voice Farm (2)
- Yello (2)

== Notable releases ==
- Santa Dog EP (1972)
- Meet The Residents (1974)
- The Residents – The Third Reich N Roll (1976)
- The Residents – Satisfaction 7-inch (1976)
- The Residents – Fingerprince (1977)
- The Beatles Play The Residents and The Residents Play The Beatles 7-inch (1977)
- The Residents – Duck Stab! EP (1978)
- The Residents – Not Available (1978)
- The Residents – Duck Stab/Buster & Glen (1978)
- The Residents – Santa Dog '78 (1978)
- The Residents – Eskimo (1979)
- The Residents – Babyfingers EP (1979)
- Snakefinger – Chewing Hides The Sound (1979)
- Tuxedomoon – Half-Mute (1980)
- The Residents – Commercial Album (1980)
- Fred Frith – Gravity (1980)
- Snakefinger – Greener Postures (1980)
- MX-80 Sound – Out of the Tunnel (1980)
- The Residents – Diskomo/Goosebump EP (1980)
- Yello – Solid Pleasure (1980)
- Yello – Claro Que Si (1981)
- MX-80 Sound – Crowd Control (1980)
- Tuxedomoon – Desire (1981)
- Fred Frith – Speechless (1981)
- The Residents – Mark of the Mole (1981)
- The Residents – The Tunes of Two Cities (1982)
- The Residents – Intermission EP (1982)
- The Residents – Mole Show (1983)
- Fred Frith – Cheap at Half the Price (1983)
- The Residents and Renaldo & The Loaf – Title In Limbo (1983)
- Residue of the Residents (1983)
- The Residents – George & James (1984)
- The Residents – Assorted Secrets (1984)
- Rhythm & Noise – Contents Under Notice (1984)
- The Residents – Whatever Happened To Vileness Fats? (1984)
- Rhythm & Noise – Chasms Accord (1985)
- The Residents – The Big Bubble (1985)
- The Residents & Snakefinger – 13th Anniversary Show – Live In Japan (1985)
- The Residents & Snakefinger – The 13th Anniversary Show Live in the U.S.A.(1986)
- The Residents – Stars & Hank Forever (1986)

== Compilations ==
- Subterranean Modern, 1979
- Frank Johnson's Favorites, 1981
- Best of Ralph, 1982

== See also ==
- List of record labels
