= Snakefinger =

English musician, singer and songwriter (1949–1987)

- Album photograph from Night of Desirable Objects

Background information
- Born: Philip Charles Lithman; 17 June 1949; Tooting, London, England
- Died: 1 July 1987 (aged 38) Linz, Austria
- Genre: New Wave
- Years active: 1971–1987
- Label: Ralph

Philip Charles Lithman (17 June 1949 – 1 July 1987), who performed under the stage name Snakefinger, was an English musician, singer and songwriter. A multi-instrumentalist, he was best known for his guitar and violin work and his collaborations with the Residents.

Static Media's grunge.com considered Lithman's 1987 album Night of Desirable Objects a 'classic album that defined the sound of '80s New Wave.'

== History ==
Lithman was born in Tooting, South London, and came from the British blues scene. He moved to San Francisco in 1971 and became associated with the avant-garde group the Residents. It is said he was given the name 'Snakefinger' by the Residents themselves based on a photograph of Lithman performing, in which his finger looks like a snake about to attack his violin.

In 1972 Lithman returned to England and formed the pub rock band Chilli Willi and the Red Hot Peppers with Martin Stone, ex-member of Mighty Baby and a fellow ex-member of Junior's Blues Band. As a duo, they released the album Kings of Robot Rhythm. In 1974, as a full band and popular live act in Britain, they released Bongos Over Balham.

Chilli Willi lasted until 1975, their last record not selling well, and by 1976 Lithman was back in the United States, this time in Los Angeles, California, seeking a recording contract, shopping his rock-style demos.

After a few years, Lithman moved back to San Francisco, reconnected with the Residents, and performed and recorded with them. Lithman's solo records, recorded under the name Snakefinger, were released by their record label Ralph Records.

His first album on Ralph was Chewing Hides the Sound in 1979, featuring original material co-written with the Residents as well as esoteric covers like Kraftwerk's "The Model". The songs showcased Lithman's distinctive slide guitar playing and often surreal imagery. This album was followed by Greener Postures in 1980, which included his first solo compositions as Snakefinger.

While on tour in Australia in 1980, Lithman had a heart attack that left him hospitalised for six months.

In 1982, Lithman formed his backing band The Vestal Virgins with former Captain Beefheart sideman Eric Drew Feldman. Snakefinger and The Vestal Virgins released Manual of Errors on Ralph in 1982. This was followed by the blues cover album Snakefinger's History of the Blues: Live in Europe in 1984. Lithman released his fourth and final album, Night of Desirable Objects in 1986, which consisted of largely original material.

Lithman performed with the Residents on their 13th Anniversary Tour in 1986.

== Death ==
On 1 July 1987, Snakefinger and his band, the Vestal Virgins, arrived in Linz, Austria, on the European Night tour. The next morning, he was found dead in a guestroom of the Posthof Club, where the band had been due to perform. He had suffered a heart attack. His single "There's No Justice in Life" was released the same day. His funeral was held in England. The Residents were unable to attend it and instead performed a wake in his honour; a studio version of this performance can be heard on The Snakey Wake.

== Discography ==
- Kings of the Robot Rhythm (1972) (with Chilli Willi and the Red Hot Peppers)
- Bongos over Balham (1974) (with Chilli Willi and the Red Hot Peppers)
- Chewing Hides the Sound (1979)
- Greener Postures (1980)
- Manual of Errors (1982)
- History of the Blues (1984)
- Night of Desirable Objects (1987)

=== The Residents ===
- "Satisfaction" (1976)
- Fingerprince (1977)
- Duck Stab!/Buster & Glen (1978)
- Eskimo (1979)
- The Commercial Album (1980)
- The Tunes of Two Cities (1982)
- Title in Limbo (1983)
- The 13th Anniversary Show - Live In Japan (1986)
- The 13th Anniversary Show - Live In the USA (1986)
- Stars & Hank Forever: The American Composers Series (1986)
- The 13th Anniversary Show - Live In Holland (1987)
- B.S (2019)

=== The Club Foot Orchestra ===
- Wild Beasts (1986)

=== Various Artists Compilations ===
- Savoy Sound – Wave Goodbye (1981)
- Potatoes: A Collection Of Folk Songs by Ralph Records (1987)
  - song: "The Ballad Of Sawney Beane/Sawney's Death Dance" by Snakefinger & His Midi-Evil Vestal Virgins
- Beets (1990)
  - song: "Reptology"

== Collaborators ==
- The Residents
- Paul Bailey (guitar, banjo, and sax player)
- Dave Barret
- Michael "Miguel" Bertel (Rhythm Guitarist)
- 6025 (former Dead Kennedys guitarist)
- Beth Custer
- Raoul N. Diseimbote (piano)
- Dick 'Deluxe' Egner
- Josh Ende (baritone sax)
- Eric Drew Feldman (worked with the Residents, Captain Beefheart, Pere Ubu, Pixies, P.J. Harvey, and Frank Black)
- Opter Flame
- George B. George (bass player)
- John H Seabury (bass player) Member of Berkeley's Psycotic Pineapple
- Ben Guy (bass player)
- Colin Hansford (guitar player)
- Dave Kopplin
- Nick Lowe (bass)
- Stephen MacKay (Tenor)
- Richard Marriott (wind, brass)
- Paul Riley (bass player)
- Steve Royal (drummer)
- Jonny B. Ryan (Philip's drummer from 1980 onward)
- N. Senada (ethnomusicologist)
- Michael Steele (worked with the Bangles)
- Martin Stone (guitarist, literary expert)
- Pete Thomas (drummer)
- David Whitten (bass player)
