= Cybermania '94 =

1994 video game awards show

- Poster by Peter Max
- Date: November 5, 1994
- Venue: Universal Amphitheatre
- Country: United States
- Presented by: Leslie Nielsen; Jonathan Taylor Thomas

Highlights
- Most wins: Voyeur (2)
- Most nominations: MegaRace and Myst (3)
- Best Overall Game: Mortal Kombat

Television coverage
- Network: TBS
- Runtime: 2 hours
- Viewership: 1.1% (Nielsen ratings)
- Produced by: Peter Hayman
- Directed by: Sue Brophey

Cybermania '94: The Ultimate Gamer Awards was the first televised video game awards show. Created by the Academy of Interactive Arts & Sciences (AIAS), the two-hour event was broadcast live on TBS on November 5, 1994, with Leslie Nielsen and Jonathan Taylor Thomas as the hosts. Out of twelve award categories, Mortal Kombat won "Best Overall Game". Although the show was received negatively, it was seen by 1.1% of US households and the AIAS produced a less successful follow-up in 1996. Geoff Keighley, who had been part of the production for Cybermania '94, went on to work on video game awards for other networks and created The Game Awards in 2014.

== Background ==
Andrew Zucker, a lawyer in the entertainment sector, envisioned an awards show for video games while watching the 43rd Primetime Emmy Awards in 1991. The show briefly introduced Syd Cassyd, who had founded the administering Academy of Television Arts & Sciences in 1946, when televisions were scarce in American households. As Zucker believed that the video game industry would experience a similar growth in the future, he established the Academy of Interactive Arts & Sciences (AIAS) later in 1991. The academy announced its first foray into awards ceremonies, to be named the "Ajax", in June 1993, aiming to distribute them at a self-funded event in April 1994. In March 1994, it planned to announce the nominees in thirty-four categories in May and hand out the awards at the Pantages Theatre on June 16. The Ajax format was ultimately abandoned.

In creating the awards for Cybermania '94, the group solicited nominations from 2,500 multimedia companies across the United States. Due to an application fee, only 200 competing entries were received. Some companies, such as LucasArts, decided to stay out of the event due to the unclear credibility of the AIAS. The academy's 300-member body compiled and voted on nominations based on their quality and sales numbers. A total of fifty categories were prepared, of which twelve were to be televised and the rest mentioned in a crawl. Subscribers of the Prodigy service were asked to reduce the number of nominees for "Best Overall Game" by voting on nine candidates.

Zucker planned the television strategy with ICE Integrated Communications & Entertainment, the only company he knew that produced award shows in addition to making video games. The AIAS pitched the idea of a televised awards show to several television networks and eventually reached an agreement with TBS. ICE subsequently presented its work to TBS and was hired to produce the event. According to early reports, the show was to be titled Cybermania: The 1994 Interactive Games Awards and later Cybermania '94: The Ultimate Gamers' Event, to be broadcast from Wilshire Theater in Beverly Hills.

== Format ==
Cybermania '94 was produced by the AIAS, ICE and TBS, with ICE's Peter Hayman as the executive producer. It was staged in the Universal Amphitheatre at Universal Studios Hollywood and broadcast live on TBS on Saturday, November 5, 1994, at 5:05 pm PST. The show ran for two hours with the actors Leslie Nielsen and Jonathan Taylor Thomas as hosts. William Shatner narrated the nominee announcements. Awards in twelve categories were handed out by a range of lesser-known celebrities, interlaced with acts like jugglers, wrestling, and dancers performing to music by Herbie Hancock, as well as comedic clips about the gaming scene.

Televoting over an 800 number was used to determine the "Best Overall Game", with votes tabulated on a backstage computer in a process audited by Price Waterhouse. The eventual winner was Mortal Kombat. Four out of twelve awards, making for almost half of all entertainment categories, were won by Philips Interactive Media. According to a representative, the company considered its products winning awards on national television "worthwhile" as a marketing strategy and morale boost for its employees. A rerun of Cybermania '94 was broadcast on November 12, 1994, at 1:05 pm PST.

== Awards ==
Winners are listed first, highlighted in boldface, and indicated with a double dagger (‡).

Best Overall Game	Best Action/Adventure
**Mortal Kombat** ‡; Doom; Myst; NBA Jam; Super Street Fighter II	**Doom** ‡; MegaRace; Return to Zork; Jump Raven; Critical Path; Super Street Fighter II; Tomcat Alley; Super Metroid
Best CD Computer Game	Best Portable
**The 7th Guest** ‡; Myst; MegaRace; Return to Zork; Escape from Cyber City	**Disney's Aladdin** ‡; Wario Land: Super Mario Land 3; Home Alone; Donkey Kong; The Legend of Zelda: Link's Awakening
Best Comedy	Best Art and Graphics in an Interactive Product
**The Wacky World of Miniature Golf** ‡; I'm Your Man; Dennis Miller: That's News to Me; Bugs Bunny Rabbit Rampage; Dating & Mating	**Myst** ‡; Tuneland; OceanLife II, III; Space: A Visual History; Macworld Interactive Vol. I, II
Best Music	Best Simulation/Strategy
**Xplora1: Peter Gabriel's Secret World** ‡; Video Jam; Prince Interactive; Freak Show; The Uptown Blues	**SimCity** ‡; Dune II; Microsoft Flight Simulator; Castles II: Siege and Conquest; Forever Growing Garden
Best Sports	Best Actor – Female
**Caesars World of Boxing** ‡; NBA Jam; FIFA International Soccer; NHL '94; Ken Griffey Jr. Presents Major League Baseball; Sports Illustrated Multimedia Almanac; QB1; A Great Day at the Races	**Grace Zabriskie (Voyeur)** ‡; Eileen Weisinger (Critical Path); Tonia Keyser (Man Enough); Virginia Capers (Gabriel Knight: Sins of the Fathers)
Best Actor – Male	Special awards
**Robert Culp (Voyeur)** ‡; Leonard Nimoy (Star Trek: 25th Anniversary); Tim Curry (Gabriel Knight: Sins of the Fathers); Christian Erickson (MegaRace); Mickey Rooney (A Great Day at the Races)	Governor's Award for Best Achievement in Virtual Reality: Iwerks Entertainment (Virtual Adventures); Special Achievement in Education: Ruff's Bone; Individual Growth In Development: American Institute for Learning (Addiction and Its Processes)

== Reception ==
The broadcast was seen by 1.1% of US households, according to Nielsen ratings. The journalistic reception was largely negative. Bill Kunkel, writing for Electronic Games, criticized the show's production value, including missing details for games (such as platforms, developers, and publishers), missed cues, poor writing, and bad performances. He also lamented that, when a winner was announced, only the involved companies were named and not the people who collected the awards. Kunkel remarked that, as a video game journalist, he had never before had to "endure anything like TBS' horrendous Cybermania '94, the first televised attempt to integrate electronic games and the tired TV award show format". Chris Nashawaty of Entertainment Weekly described the ceremony as "a low-rent whack at the MTV Video Music Awards without the faintest whiff of Oscar's legitimacy".

Chuck Miller of Computer Gaming World argued that, because several major titles were not nominated and others (such as Super Street Fighter II and Return to Zork) were nominated in the same categories despite having different genres, the show failed to adequately reflect the video game industry. Jeremy Berg of Computer Player criticized the AIAS for prioritizing profiting off the entry fee over nominating games based on merit. Additionally, Kunkel believed the AIAS had advantaged Philips Interactive Media with its many wins and nominations such that it appeared "more important to the industry than Sega, Nintendo, 3DO and Atari combined". In 2022, Time Extension contacted several of the show's winners, of whom several reported they had not known the show was to be televised prior to the event.

== Legacy ==
Cybermania '94 was the first televised video game awards show. The AIAS produced a follow-up event, The Second Annual AIAS Awards, originally scheduled for December 1995. To broaden its audience, the academy sought a prime time slot on a major network and a well-known host. Considerations for the latter included Dennis Miller, Howie Mandel, and Sinbad. The show was ultimately held online via Bravo on April 17, 1996, and hosted by Ariana Richards. According to Joseph Olin, the 2004–2010 AIAS president, "maybe five people watched it". Reestablished in 1996, the academy went on to create the Interactive Achievement Awards in 1998.

Geoff Keighley, at the time a teenager writing for a video game magazine, was part of the Cybermania '94 production team through a connection between his father and Hayman. As the "interactive products specialist", he wrote Shatner's narrations and informed other team members on video games. He said that being at an event with the creators behind popular games like Doom and Myst left a big impression on him. Keighley went on to work on the annually hosted award shows of G4 (G-Phoria) and Spike TV (Spike Video Game Awards) until 2013. In 2014, he created The Game Awards, which he hosts.
