= Interactive music CD-ROM =

An interactive music CD-ROM is a CD-ROM containing software with interactive multimedia features intended to complement the work of a musical artist. Compared to an enhanced CD-ROM containing music, it is usually a standalone work of software. The format was adopted by several popular music artists during the 1990s including David Bowie, Peter Gabriel, and Prince. The trend of musical artists creating interactive software declined by 1997, due to the waning interest of consumers and publishers.

== Features ==
Interactive music CD-ROMs are designed to display multimedia a user can interact with, merging music, video clips, and games. The design of an interactive music CD-ROM can vary. Some CD-ROMs contain multimedia allowing users to access additional information about a musician. These CD-ROMs may contain interactive elements, such as a virtual mixing console to remix sound or video. Other releases may include standalone interactive features presented as their own work, encouraging users to explore virtual worlds or experiences created or inspired by a musical artist.

== History ==
One of the first recording artists to explore the format was Todd Rundgren, whose 1993 album No World Order, released on the Philips CD-i, featured an interactive component in which users could remix tracks by changing tempo, tracks, or samples. Several artists expressed interest in using multimedia as a vehicle for music, with David Bowie considering multimedia "the best delivery system currently available".

In September 1993, BMG announced a joint venture with San Francisco publisher Ion to develop music CD-ROMs, following their development of the David Bowie CD-ROM Jump. In 1994, the National Academy of Recording Arts & Sciences sponsored a showcase of works in the genre at the San Francisco International Film Festival, and such games were featured in Cybermania '94 by the Academy of Interactive Arts and Sciences, where the Peter Gabriel title Xplora1: Peter Gabriel's Secret World received Best Use of Music.

Billboard reported on the decline of the music CD-ROM format in 1997, citing a number of factors including a downturn in the software industry, the increasing accessibility of the Internet, pricing and quality issues. During this year, software publisher Graphix Zone ceased development of music CD-ROMs.

== List of music CD-ROMs ==
Title	Year	Artist	Developer	Ref.
No World Order	1993	Todd Rundgren	Todd Rundgren, Aaron David Levine	
Xplora1: Peter Gabriel's Secret World	1993	Peter Gabriel	Real World MultiMedia, Brilliant Media	
Freak Show	1994	The Residents	The Voyager Company	
Heart: 20 Years of Rock & Roll	1994	Heart	Compton's NewMedia	
Jump: The David Bowie Interactive CD-ROM	1994	David Bowie	Ion	
Prince Interactive	1994	Prince	Graphix Zone	
Gingerbread Man	1994	The Residents	Ion	
Headcandy	1994	Brian Eno	Ion	
Quest for Fame	1995	Aerosmith	Virtual Music Entertainment	
Puppet Motel	1995	Laurie Anderson	The Voyager Company	
Highway 61 Interactive	1995	Bob Dylan	Graphix Zone	
Bad Day on the Midway	1995	The Residents	Inscape	
Voodoo Lounge	1995	The Rolling Stones	Second Vision	
All This Time	1995	Sting	Starwave	
Eve	1996	Peter Gabriel	Real World MultiMedia	
Devo Presents Adventures of the Smart Patrol	1996	Devo	Inscape	

== Reception ==
The music CD-ROM gained interest as a transition of music into a new medium. Billboard estimated at its peak, successful CD-ROMs in this line each sold between 70,000 to 150,000 units, although the market for these titles became less commercially successful over time.

Some theorists identified the opportunities of interactive multimedia presented in creating new ways to consume music. Composer Paul Théberge wrote that software could "give the listener greater editorial decision-making power over their listening experience", although these methods would be "limited by the available technology [and] the manufacturers' own perception of the needs and interests" of listeners. Museum of Communication curator Beatrice Tobler wrote music CD-ROMs reflected changing ways in how consumers could perceive music, by providing greater opportunities to interpret and play with music beyond listening.

However, several critics critiqued the limited interactivity offered by titles. Describing the software as "ego trips disguised as diversions", Entertainment Weekly considered features such as mixing boards "pointless" and their overall purpose as to market the artists rather than to entertain. CD-ROM Today stated that titles varied "greatly in how much they reveal about each artist", considering Prince Interactive offered little insight into the "goals or personal obsessions" of Prince.
