= Silliwood =

Term for California companies

Silliwood, a portmanteau of Silicon Valley and Hollywood, is the term given to various California companies involved with creating CD-ROM computer games based on Hollywood movies, most of which did not appeal to serious gamers in the mid-1990s. The term also referred to the advent of computer-generated imagery (CGI) in Hollywood movies.

Spurred on in large part by the success of CD-ROM games like Myst, these games emphasized flashy production values and well-known (or at least, recognizable) actors over gameplay. These include unsuccessful games such as The Horde (starring Kirk Cameron), A Fork in the Tale (starring Rob Schneider), Night Trap (starring Dana Plato) and several games starring Tim Curry, and successful games such as the DreamWorks Studios title The Neverhood, the Warner Bros.-produced Edgar Allan Poe game The Dark Eye, and The Residents game Bad Day on the Midway, and later Wing Commander games.

In 1996, Steve Jobs described the term as "the space that a lot of companies were in so they can raise investment, but they never produced any products. It was sort of technology meeting Hollywood". Jobs noted that Pixar was the only successful company "where Silicon Valley and Hollywood have met".
