= Media Vision =

Media Vision Technology, Inc.
- Type: Corporation
- Industry: Audio Technologies, Video games
- Founded: 1990
- Defunct: 1995
- Fate: Financial fraud, renamed to Aureal Semiconductor in May 1996
- Successor: Aureal Semiconductor
- Headquarters: Fremont, California, USA
- Key people: Paul Jain, CEO Russell Faust, COO; Steve Allan, CFO; Dan Gochnauer, VP of Engineering; Wayne Nakamura, Director of Manufacturing; Bryan J. Colvin, Director of Hardware Engineering; Tim Bratton, Director of Strategic Marketing; Jim Gifford, Director of Software Engineering; Doug Cody, Senior Software Engineer Ken Nicholson, Director of Game Software Development
- Products: Sound cards, Video cards, Computer games, Multimedia kits
- Subsidiaries: Pellucid

Media Vision Technology, Inc., was an American electronics manufacturer of primarily computer sound cards and CD-ROM kits, operating from 1990 to approximately 1995 in Fremont, California. Media Vision was widely known for its Pro AudioSpectrum PC sound cards—which it often bundled with CD-ROM drives—it is also known for its spectacular growth and demise.

== Company history ==
Media Vision was founded in May 1990 by Paul Jain and Tim Bratton. Early employees also included Russ Faust, Michael Humphries, Dan Gochnauer, Bryan Colvin and Doug Cody, all from Jain's prior company, Video Seven. As Bratton recalls, he wrote the company's business plan while an engineer at National Semiconductor based on Jain's vision of evolving multimedia from VGA to audio and video. Jain raised funding, based on a business plan on a single sheet of paper, from top VCs such as Brentwood, Nazem, 3i and others.

Media Vision became a publicly traded company in late 1992.

In 1993, Media Vision took over Pellucid, a spin-off of Silicon Graphics to form the new Visual Technology Group. Pellucid had taken over SGI's IrisVision business and developed high-performance video graphics cards, sold as the Pro Graphics 1024. After the demise of Media Vision, several of Pellucids employees founded 3dfx.

Jain oversaw the development of several multimedia chips because he quickly realized that the audio board business would morph into audio chips on PC motherboards. Media Vision developed three complex chips such as a 16-bit accelerator chip, an FM synthesis chip and a Mixed Signal DSP.

=== New logotype and new image ===
Media Vision logotype (1990–1993)

In 1993, Media Vision updated its logotype to reflect its expanding product lines and broad foray into technologies beyond computer audio. Perhaps one of the biggest endeavors was the company's leap into software publishing with the creation of its Multimedia Publishing Group. CD-ROM titles such as Critical Path, Quantum Gate, and Forever Growing Garden were often bundled with its multimedia kits. The new logo reflected the company's desire to be known as a cutting-edge multimedia technology company. During the same year, the company expanded business operations into Europe with the establishment of Media Vision GmbH in Munich, Germany.

=== Financial scandal ===
Media Vision could not sustain its rise. On May 17, 1994, CEO Paul Jain stepped down as Media Vision and quickly became the subject of the longest-running securities fraud case in Silicon Valley history. The investigation and trial lasted nearly a decade, resulting in criminal charges filed against Jain in 1998, his unsuccessful indictment on 27 counts of financial fraud, and judgments against Jain and CFO Steve Allen.

After seeking protection under Chapter 11 of the federal Bankruptcy Code in December 1994, Media Vision Technology Inc. was renamed Aureal Semiconductor Inc. in May 1996.

== Products ==
Media Vision's products included PC adapter cards, other hardware, and computer games.

=== PC adapter cards ===
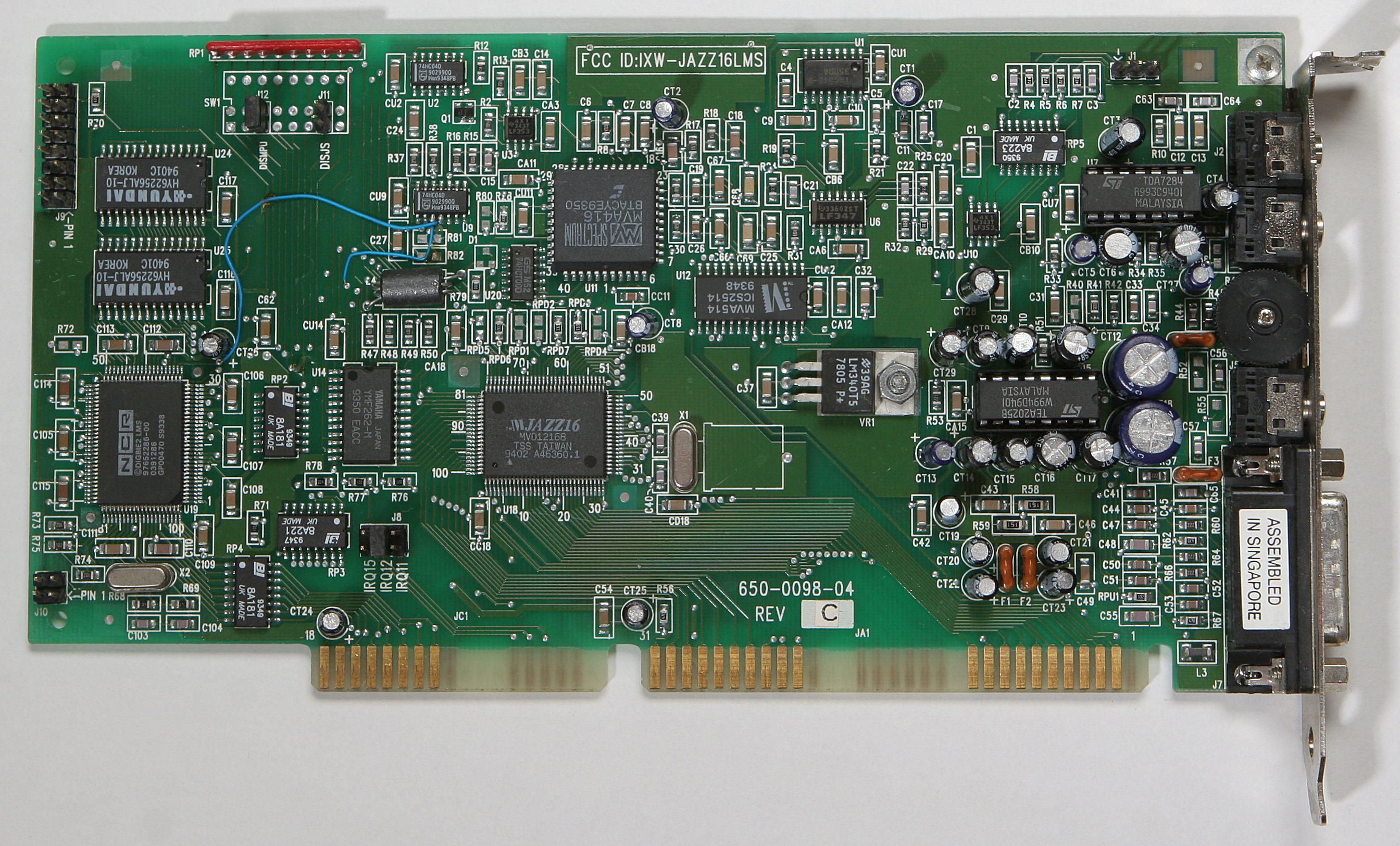
MediaVision Jazz16 LMSI

- Pro Audio Spectrum (1991): 8-bit ISA audio card with CD-ROM interface
- Pro Audio Spectrum Plus: ISA audio card, 8-bit digital sampling, 16-bit digital audio playback with CD-ROM interface, Sound Blaster compatibility.
- Pro Audio Spectrum 16 (May 1992): 16-bit ISA card with CD-ROM interface, 16-bit stereo digital audio, stereo FM synthesis, Sound Blaster compatibility; based on the MVD101 chipset.
- Thunder Board: low-cost 8-bit ISA Sound Blaster compatible sound.
- Thunder and Lightning: VGA adapter with Sound Blaster compatible sound.
- PCMCIA 16 Bit Sound Card
- Pro Audio Studio 16: enhanced version of the Pro Audio Spectrum 16 sound card, bundled with voice-recognition software and a microphone
- Pro Audio 16 Basic: Stripped-down version of Pro Audio Spectrum 16, without SCSI interface, the bundled voice recognition software and microphone; based on the MVD101 chipset.
- Pro Sonic 16: Based on Media Vision's JAZZ 16 chipset (not compatible with the Pro Audio Spectrum line).
- Pro 3-D: Based on Media Vision's JAZZ 16 chipset (not compatible with the Pro Audio Spectrum line), with built-in SRS surround sound, and KORG wavetable daughter board.
- ProZonic: Released in 1996 by Media Vision Innovations, Inc.
- Pro Movie Spectrum/Studio (1993): a realtime video capture board, ISA card, Video1 hardware video codec
- Pro Graphics 1024: high-performance video card
- Pro Graphics 1280: high-performance video card

=== Other hardware ===
- Multimedia kits, each bundling a Pro Audio Spectrum sound card, CD-ROM drive and software
- Audio Port (March 1992): parallel/printer port audio device for laptop computers
- CDPC: integrated desktop CD-ROM, audio I/O, amplified speakers
- Memphis: enhanced version of the CDPC
- ReNO: portable CD-ROM/CD Audio device
- Pro Audio Spectrum Patch Panel for the Apple Macintosh

=== Software ===
- Critical Path
- Quantum Gate
- Forever Growing Garden
- PlanIt Adrenaline
- PlanIt Earth

== Internal structure ==
Internally, Media Vision was dominated by its large engineering and marketing departments, roughly equal in size and reporting to the Chief Operating Officer Russell Faust. Director of Manufacturing Wayne Nakamura also reported to the COO.

=== Engineering ===
The company's engineering efforts were headed by VP of Engineering Dan Gochnauer, formerly of the Sperry-Rand Corporation.

==== Hardware ====
The Director of Hardware Engineering was Bryan J. Colvin, once an early employee of Apple Computer, where he designed much of the Apple IIc.

In addition to Component Engineer James Persall, the engineering staff included electrical engineers:

- Korhan Titizer designer of the fully custom MVA508 analog mixer ASIC
- John Minami, co-designer (with Bryan Colvin) of the digital standard-cell MVD101 ASIC
- Mike Rovner, designer of many analog PCB circuits
- John Carlsen
- John Neary

==== Software ====
The Director of Software Engineering was Jim Gifford. Reporting to him were:

- Doug Cody (a distant relative of Buffalo Bill Cody)
- Shao Hong Ma, an ADPCM specialist who wrote embedded software
- Ken Nicholson, who later became Director of Game Software Development.

The development of SCSI device drivers was outsourced to Trantor Systems.

=== Sales and marketing ===
Sales staff included:

- Michael Humphress, VP Sales

Marketing staff included:

- Tim Bratton
- Claire Merriam, Public Relations
- Ryo Koyama, Advertising
- Gary Kinsey, Developer Relations (ISV)

== See also ==
- Aureal Semiconductor
- Creative Labs
- Sensaura
- QSound
- Sound card
- Media.Vision (unrelated Japanese video game company)
