= Neary =

Anglicized form of the Irish language surname

Neary is an Anglicized form of the Irish language surname Ó Náradhaigh, denoting a descendant of Náradhach, a name meaning modest. Notable people with this surname include:

- Aaron Neary (born 1992), American American football player
- Alcott Neary (1892–1941), American American football and basketball player and coach
- Aoife Neary (born 1985), Irish camogie player
- Frank Neary (1921–2004), English football player
- J. Peter Neary (1950–2021), Irish economist
- Jo Neary, British comedian, writer and actress
- John Neary (1964–2015), American engineer
- Liz Neary (born 1951), Irish sportsperson
- Lynn Neary, American radio journalist
- Martin Neary (1940–2025), English organist and choral conductor
- Michael Neary (bishop) (born 1946), Irish Catholic prelate
- Michael Neary (surgeon), Irish struck-off doctor
- Mike Neary (born 1948), Canadian rower
- Paddy Neary (born 1956), Irish hurler and referee
- Pamela Neary, American politician
- Patricia Neary (born 1942), American ballerina
- Patrick Neary (regulator), Irish civil servant
- Patrick Neary (born 1963), American Catholic bishop elect
- Paul Neary (1949–2024), British comic book artist
- Sam Neary (born 2002), British racing driver
- Shay Neary, American fashion model
- Shea Neary (born 1968), British boxer
- Stephen M. Neary, American military officer
- Steve Neary (1925–1996), Canadian politician
- Tony Neary (born 1948), English rugby union player

== See also ==
- Neary's, a former New York City Irish bar and restaurant owned by James Joseph "Jimmy" Neary
