= Devo Presents Adventures of the Smart Patrol (video game) =

1996 adventure video game

- Developer: Inscape
- Publisher: Inscape
- Writers: Gerald V. Casale, Mark Mothersbaugh
- Platforms: Macintosh, Windows, Windows 3.x
- Release: 1996
- Genre: Adventure
- Mode: Single-player

Devo Presents Adventures of the Smart Patrol is a 1996 interactive music CD-ROM and video game developed and published by Inscape and co-created by American new wave band Devo.

The game received negative reception from critics upon release, with video game publication GameSpot having it as a contender for the worst game of 1996.

== Gameplay ==
Screenshot of the game

Set in the fictional universe of Spudland, Devo Presents Adventures of the Smart Patrol has the players travel from various places with the members of the Smart Patrol. The player has twelve in-game hours to capture Turkey Monkey, "an insane, horrible freak mutant, the result of a rogue recombinant DNA experiment", and find the cure for osso bucco myelitis, a bone-dissolving disease that forces its victims to walk around in skeleton-like suits. Meanwhile, the player must face off against antagonists such as the health care provider Universal Health Systems and entertainment corporation Big Media, who are suppressing the cure, as well as right-wing fundamentalists known as the Pilgrims. Helping the Smart Patrol are the scientists Sun Wang Pin and Dr. Byrthfood, as well as General Boy and his son Booji Boy.

== Development ==
Devo Presents Adventures of the Smart Patrol was developed and published by Inscape. Devo's founders Gerald V. Casale and Mark Mothersbaugh co-wrote the story to the game. The band was also involved with composing the music and overseeing the graphics. Casale approached Inscape president Michael L. Nash on his idea for a video game. Nash liked the idea and backed the project for development. Inscape showcased the game at E3 1995. Casale described the game as "Devo: The Next Generation". It was planned for release on 17 October 1996. Billboard stated that sales of the game were "underwhelming", according to a software retailer interviewed.

== Reception ==
=== Critical reception ===
Reception

Review scores
Publication	Score
Computer Games Strategy Plus	0.5/5
GameSpot	2.8/10
Entertainment Weekly	D+
The Indianapolis Star	2/4

Adventures of the Smart Patrol received negative reviews upon release. Critics expressed disappointment in the game, and reviewers felt its poor quality reflected negatively on the band's waning cultural relevance. GameSpot listed the game as the second worst of 1996, describing it as a "horrible mess" of an attempt to reintroduce the band to a digital medium.

Critics expressed frustration with the gameplay, finding it hard to understand how to progress. GameSpot faulted its puzzles as "unforgiving" and "mercilessly impossible", writing that its time-based system did not allow players to make mistakes or encourage exploration and experimentation.

The visual presentation of Adventures of the Smart Patrol was faulted. Considering Devo to have created pioneering work in music videos, critics were disappointed the quality of the video playback was poor, with Computer Games Strategy Plus faulting the it as "inexcusable" due to being "grainy", "poorly integrated" and "horridly acted".

The plot received a mixed reception, with some critics viewing it incoherent and difficult to understand. Describing it as "convoluted", CNET appreciated the story raised "interesting and controversial" subject matter, but felt the game had little to say about these issues. The Atlantic viewed Adventures of the Smart Patrol as well-written and featuring a clear vision, stating it was "ridiculously funny yet also real and deeply knowing".

=== Retrospective reception ===
Several publications have listed Adventures of the Smart Patrol as a "weird" example of software based on musicians, and The New York Times cited it as one of several creatively unsuccessful examples of music-based interactive software. Describing the game as one "that must be seen to be believed", Computer Gaming World satirically critiqued the game as attempting to be more "smart and clever" than its substance, faulting its "tiny, out of sync" video clips, its "racial stereotyping", and its lack of gameplay.
