= Highway 61 Interactive =

1995 video game

- Developer: Graphix Zone
- Publishers: Graphix Zone, Sony Music Entertainment
- Platforms: Mac OS, Windows 3.x
- Release: 1995
- Genre: Graphic adventure
- Mode: Single-player

Highway 61 Interactive is a 1995 interactive music CD-ROM developed by Graphix Zone, based on the musician Bob Dylan and his music career. It was developed and published by Graphix Zone, with Sony Music Entertainment as co-publisher.

== Overview ==
The game opens with a menu of a collage of photos and objects meant to represent the musician. Clicking on any object takes you to a 3-D interactive environment of places of Dylan's career, such as Greenwich Village, Madison Square Garden, and the recording studios of Columbia Records.

Previously unknown songs were included on the CD, such as an electric version of "House of the Rising Sun".

== Development ==
Highway 61 Interactive was developed by Graphic Zone, a California multimedia company. Graphic Zone's founder and president Chuck Cortright, a fan of Bob Dylan, approached the musician's manager and lawyer to make the game. Discussions lasted six months before approval, with a staff of twenty spending seven months completing it. Bob Dylan himself chose the game's title and cover art, as well as which songs and music would be included. Celebrity photographer Daniel Kramer choose twenty of his early photographs of Dylan for use.

Highway 61 Interactive was launched at the Sony Music Studios in February 1995. At the event, Al Kooper and Roger McGuinn performed Dylan's songs "Mr. Tambourine Man", "My Back Pages", and "Knockin' on Heaven's Door".

== Reception ==
Reception

Review score
Publication	Score
Entertainment Weekly	B

Joel Selvin from SFGate considered the interactive to be "more bells and whistles than real train ride." Chris Willman from the Los Angeles Times praised its amount of environments used, saying it surpassed Graphix Zone's previous title Prince Interactive. Bob Cannon from Entertainment Weekly gave the game a "B" rating.
