= Bad Day on the Midway =

1995 video game

- Developer: Inscape
- Publisher: Inscape
- Designer: Jim Ludtke
- Platforms: Windows, Mac
- Release: November 28, 1995
- Genre: Adventure
- Mode: Single-player

Bad Day on the Midway is a 1995 interactive music CD-ROM and video game written and directed by the Residents, animated and designed by Jim Ludtke, developed and published by Inscape. In March, 2022, the game's copyright holder Cryptic Corporation and former Inscape CEO Michael L. Nash allowed the game to be released as freeware.

The game takes place in the titular Midway where the player first takes control of Timmy, an easily amused 10-year-old boy, but is soon able to switch perspective and control to a number of different characters as they navigate through the fair. The goal isn't made very clear, as the game is considered first and foremost to be more of an interactive narrative and visual experience, but there are various ways to die during gameplay, and multiple endings can be achieved depending on which characters are left alive at the end of one in-game day.

The character Timmy was later brought back in a series of short videos by the Residents in 2006. In 2012, a novel was published based on the game's story, along with a CD of "reconsidered" music from the game's soundtrack.

The game was optioned by Ron Howard at Imagine Television for a proposed series to be directed by David Lynch. After two years of meetings with Lynch, the project was dropped because a script was never agreed upon. Had the project moved forward, The Residents would not have been creatively involved as their contract only gave them consulting roles in the pilot.

== Gameplay ==
Bad Day is entirely mouse-controlled. The game's core gameplay mechanic is the possibility to switch control and perspective to most of the game's characters, essentially "getting inside their heads." The player always begins the game in control of Timmy, and characters must be in view before the player has the option to switch over to them. Once the character is in view, the player must simply click on them to switch over.

The character currently in control of the player will occasionally display random strands of thought on the bottom of the screen, sometimes in reaction to the game's events, locations, or other characters, who will often interact with the player as they interact. These thought displays serve only for character exposition, but can sometimes clue the player in on what to do or where to go next.

Every character in the game (except Jocko) has a life story sequence done by a different visual artist. They are not important to complete the game, again serving only as character exposition. Most of these stories can be accessed by meeting their corresponding character in a specific location, although some stories have further requirements for access.

Even though there are death scenarios and multiple endings, the game doesn't contain any action or puzzle sequences; the player is instead encouraged to simply explore the Midway and listen to the characters' life stories. However, each playable character does have their own objective, and the game does run on a very arbitrary time limit: occasionally a clock will appear on the top of the screen. When this clock does appear seems to be random, and it only displays what time it is, not that time has passed. Time passes usually when the player enters or exits a building. The game begins at 1:00 PM and ends at midnight. If the player has survived by then, the game will trigger one of its ending sequences.

== Characters ==
- Timmy - A 10-year-old boy. The player always begins the game in control of him. He is easily amused and full of wonder, showing great interest in everything. He is immune to most death scenarios in the game as he is "protected by his youth." Timmy is voiced by Diana Alden.
- Dixie - The new owner and boss of the Midway. She runs the Kill-A-Commie Shooting Gallery where she also takes care of her comatose husband Ike. She dresses like a stereotypical cowgirl because of her dream to become a country & western singer. She tries to keep a positive outlook on life, but is troubled by her husband's situation, loneliness, and problems with the IRS. After the IRS Man demands to see the Midway's tax records from the past five years, Dixie's objective is to find Ike's tax documents. Dixie is voiced by Molly Harvey; her life story is illustrated by Ronald M. Davis.
- Ike - The previous owner of the Midway, currently comatose and kept in a private room by his wife Dixie. Most of the game's characters assume he died after a mysterious accident. He is a well-known Nazi sympathizer, who served in World War II, and owned a Nazi-themed miniature golf course before meeting and marrying Dixie. He doesn't have a life story sequence per se, and due to him being in a coma, the player cannot take control of him. But his brain can still be accessed briefly. Ike is voiced by Ollie Gordon, and his dream sequence is animated by Bill Domonkos.
- Lottie - A freak performer whose special characteristics are her lack of legs (lost in a car accident), and a condition that makes her skin look like tree bark. Due to this condition, she adopts the stage name of "Lottie the Human Log," and dresses like a tree as she sings a song telling her life story. She is the mother of Ted, and apart from Ike, is the only character in the game the player cannot switch over to. She is also normally never seen outside of her cabin. Lottie is voiced by Molly Harvey; her life story is illustrated by Georganne Deen.
- Ted - Lottie's son and assistant, and secretly also a serial killer. He feels it is his duty to kill ugly things, a process which he calls "ugly liberation." He then collects small pieces of flesh, hair and clothes and turns them into fake butterflies, which he finds beautiful. Unfortunately for the player, he believes most people are ugly as well, and will kill the player if they run into him in certain locations. He kills people by paralyzing them with a poison dart, then gives them a brief monologue before strangling them to death. Timmy is the only playable character Ted is friendly to and won't kill, as he sees Timmy's innocence as a beautiful thing. He also deeply loves his mother and finds her beautiful due to her persistence and optimism in the face of tragedy. Ted is voiced by Mark Morgan; his life story is illustrated by Dave McKean.
- Dagmar - A stripper who goes by the stage name of "Dagmar the Dog Woman." Her body is covered in tattoos of dogs, each one representing a different failed relationship with a man. She is usually accompanied by her two Dobermans, Huck and Chuck. She is quite caustic and holds very cynical views on men and love. She dislikes Dixie, and takes a particular liking to the IRS Man. Dagmar is voiced by Sharon Ludtke; her life story is illustrated by Paul Mavrides.
- IRS Man - His real name is unknown; the game's credits only refer to him as the IRS Man. He comes to the Midway to investigate a long history of tax evasion on part of its owners. He is extremely patriotic and proud of his job, but is also very dry and anal-retentive, even a bit antisocial. A dog lover, he takes particular interest in Dagmar. He is voiced by "Seymore Hodges" (a pseudonym for the singing Resident); his life story is illustrated by Doug Fraser.
- Otto - He runs the "Oscar The Racing Rat" game with his pet rat Oscar. He had a wife and child who deeply irritated him until he ran away from home, changed his name, and started his Racing Rat game in the Midway. He has a shrill, stuttering voice and a greedy, egotistical personality. With a secret letter from Jocko, he blackmails Dixie to pressure her into making enhancements to his Racing Rat attraction. Otto is voiced by John Sanborn; his life story is illustrated by Peter Kuper.
- Oscar - A rat with a strangely red-colored head, and the star of Otto's Racing Rat game. He carries a deadly plague which is spread around the Midway once he bites Otto and runs away, prompting Otto to run around the Midway in panic looking for him. The plague's notable symptoms seem to be an extremely high fever, and increased blood pressure causing one's face to turn red; death soon follows. While the player can switch over to Oscar, they can't assume control of him - he simply runs around the Midway before granting the player access to his life story sequence, illustrated by Richard Sala.
- Jocko - Ike's foreman, and Dixie's lover. He previously attempted to murder Ike in order to find the gold he supposedly hid somewhere on the Midway, and use the money to quit his job and run away with Dixie (although she had no knowledge of this plan and would not have approved of it). After the plan failed and only resulted in Ike being paralyzed, Jocko ran away. He comes back to the Midway in disguise to look for the gold and retrieve a tape containing footage of his attempted murder. Not much is known about his past, as he has no life story sequence, but it is implied he had a son and probably never met him. He is voiced by "Elmore Madison" (another pseudonym for the singing Resident).

== Music ==
Have a Bad Day

Studio album by the Residents
- Released: 1996
- Genres: Avant-garde, video game music
- Length: 47:59
- Labels: Euro Ralph, East Side Digital

The Residents chronology
Bad Day on the Midway (1995)	Have a Bad Day (1996)	Wormwood: Curious Stories from the Bible (1998)

Professional ratings
Review scores
Source	Rating
AllMusic	4/5 stars

In 1996, the Residents released a "soundtrack album" titled Have a Bad Day; however, according to the album's liner notes, although it does consist mostly of music from the game, the tracks are presented as small suites and sound collages, sometimes with either new or unused material.

All tracks are written by the Residents.

No.	Title	Length
1.	"Bad Day on the Midway"	1:59
2.	"Dagmar the Dog Woman"	3:30
3.	"I Ain't Seen No Rats"	3:30
4.	"Tears of the Taxman"	2:50
5.	"God's Teardrops"	5:14
6.	"The Seven Tattoos"	3:17
7.	"The Marvels of Mayhem"	3:38
8.	"Lottie the Human Log"	4:38
9.	"Ugly Liberation"	6:15
10.	"Daddy's Poems"	6:15
11.	"The Red Head of Death"	3:48
12.	"Timmy"	3:05
Total length:		47:59

Selections of music and visuals from the game would later be presented in a 10-minute video on the Residents' 2001 DVD Icky Flix. These music selections would also be re-recorded and performed on the DVD and its subsequent tour.

== Reception ==
Reception

Review scores
Publication	Score
Computer Gaming World	4/5
PC Gamer (US)	80%
PC Entertainment	4/5
NewMedia	"Awesome"

The game won the 1995 'Macrovision International User Conference Award' in two categories – Best Entertainment Title and Most Innovative Use of Multimedia. GameSpot gave the game 8.1 out of 10 stating “With graphics that perfectly match the story's mood, hauntingly upbeat music, and superbly crafted characters, the twisted design team has forged a story that is engrossing and entertaining throughout.“
