= Where's Waldo?: Exploring Geography =

1996 video game

- Developer: WarnerActive
- Publisher: Inscape
- Platform: Windows
- Release: NA: June 23, 1996
- Genre: Puzzle
- Mode: Single-player

Where's Waldo? Exploring Geography is an educational video game based on the Where's Waldo? book series.

== Summary ==
In the game, the player must find Waldo, locate the missing athletes of the world, and find the missing Champions Cup. While finding Waldo and the athletes, the player will gather clues that lead to other athletes and the Champions Cup.

The game's activities can be played at three levels of difficulty, and is appropriate for all ages. The software contains hundreds of bright, colorful images and a musical score that reflects the different cultures of the world.

All of the features in the game are designed for variable outcomes, including Waldo's location in each screen. This allows the player to play multiple times without repeating the past experience.

Aside from being a purely entertainment-based program, the game's exercises are based upon the 1994 National Geography Standards.
