= Peter Gabriel: Eve =

1996 video game by Peter Gabriel

- Developer: Real World Multimedia
- Publisher: Real World Multimedia
- Platforms: Microsoft Windows, Macintosh
- Release: EU: 1996; NA: May 1997
- Genre: Adventure
- Mode: Single-player

Peter Gabriel: Eve, also known as simply Eve (stylized as evɘ), is a 1996 interactive music CD-ROM and adventure video game directed by Michael Coulson and co-produced by the Starwave Corporation, developed and published by Real World Multimedia for Windows and Macintosh in 1996–1997. It was created in association with and featuring the music of Peter Gabriel.

== Gameplay ==
Players navigate surrealistic landscapes and use the cursor to point and click on interactive elements. The game features four sequential stages: named "mud", "garden", "profit", and "paradise". Players can move the cursor to the edges of the screen to scroll across scenes vertically and horizontally.

== Development and release ==
Eve was developed by Real World Multimedia, the Bath, England based multimedia branch of music label Real World Studios, founded by musician Peter Gabriel. The game was made in collaboration with Starwave, the software business of entrepreneur Paul Allen. Development took place over two years and involved 60 staff from both studios, creating the game from over 22,000 images, 80 minutes of video and 45 minutes of music. It is the second CD-ROM directed by Gabriel following the release of Xplora1: Peter Gabriel's Secret World in 1994, which was commercially successful. Gabriel conceived Eve as a "spiritual and mythological collage" of imagery relating to relationships, using Adam and Eve as its central motif. Imagery from the game was filmed from areas across the United Kingdom.

The game features the artistic work of several collaborators, including Cathy de Monchaux, Yayoi Kusama, Nils-Udo and Helen Chadwick. Collaborations involved commissioning new works, as well as using existing works. The collaborators were chosen by Gabriel due to the "organic" nature of their works, who provided each with a song featured on the game ("Come Talk to Me", "Shaking the Tree", "In Your Eyes" and "Passion") as direction for their contribution. Gabriel worked with Chadwick after witnessing their art at the Serpentine Gallery, and Chadwick designed a new work for the game, featuring a pyramid of flowers made of wax, built in the gardens of Real World Studios. Chadwick died of a heart attack during development of the game, leading the Eve to be dedicated to her.

Eve was released in Europe in 1996, with a North American release following in 1997. The North American release was delayed due to the exit of Starwave from the software industry, and later distributed by Graphix Zone. The game was previewed at a release party March 1997 at the Chelsea Piers in New York City, with figures such as Laurie Anderson, Lou Reed and Philip Glass attending. Eve was released alongside a website, Radio Real World, and a fanzine titled Real World Notes, providing further information about the game.

== Reception ==
=== Critical reception ===
Reception

Review scores
Publication	Score
CNET Gamecenter	7/10
Computer Games Strategy Plus	4/5
Game Informer	4.5/10
GameSpot	5.8/10
Entertainment Weekly	A+
PC Review	6/10
Online Gaming Review	5/10

Eve was praised by several critics as innovative and imaginative, particularly compared to other multimedia releases by music artists. It was also considered to be an improvement upon Gabriel's previous CD-ROM, Xplora 1.

Some critics considered that Eve was linear, and expressed frustration with the puzzles. Others viewed the game featured limited interactivity. Describing the game as "the endpoint of current multimedia development", Zeit Online felt whilst the game was elaborate, users had minimal opportunities for interaction other than to click to view imagery.

=== Accolades ===
The game won the Milia d'Or Grand Prize award at Cannes in February 1997.
