= Xplora1: Peter Gabriel's Secret World =

1993 video game

XPLORA1: Peter Gabriel's Secret World
- Developer: Real World Media
- Publisher: MacPlay
- Designer: Peter Gabriel
- Platforms: Macintosh, CD-i, PC
- Release: 21 December 1993 (Macintosh); 9 March 1995 (Windows)
- Genre: Music Game
- Mode: Single-player

XPLORA1: Peter Gabriel's Secret World (or simply XPLORA1) is an interactive music CD-ROM designed by musician Peter Gabriel. It was intended to promote his 1992 album, Us, and the success of Xplora1 would prompt him to release a similar musically themed interactive game entitled EVE in 1996 as the second of his post-WOMAD projects.

== Summary ==
XPLORA1 was conceived by Brilliant Media's Steve Nelson and pitched to Peter in 1990. The project was developed at Brilliant Media's offices in SOMA, San Francisco, CA. The design and coding for the initial release on Mac CDROM was created in HyperCard. Footage was filmed at WOMAD and on location at the studio in Bath, UK. The branding, marketing and retail distribution was handled by Brian Fargo's Interplay Studios. It was first released for Macintosh in 1993, followed by Windows in 1994 and CD-i in 1995, in which the project was completed in collaboration with Brilliant Media under Gabriel's own label Real World Records.

The gameplay consists of a number of sub-games such as scavenger hunts, sliding mixes, music, and puzzles. The game offers an interactive mode and a watch mode. In interactive mode, the player can explore brief summaries of a number of musicians Gabriel has performed with in the past. One feature allows the player to create custom remixes using guitars, drums, and Gabriel's voice. Watch mode provides a synopsis of Gabriel's music without the player-input found in interactive mode. As the player completes puzzles and accomplishes goals, new areas of the CD are unlocked that feature new content for the player to explore. The game features footage from Gabriel's childhood, including various baby pictures. It comprises over 140 minutes of visuals and audio, including the full-length tracks of "Digging in the Dirt" and "Steam". In the UK, the game was exclusively sold at 49 HMV retail stores.

== Reception ==
Computer Gaming World said in March 1994 that while the backstage footage was interesting, "explorers will have the most fun remixing their own Peter Gabriel music videos and joining in on jam sessions. Multimedia is a much abused term, but this beautiful work deserves the title". William Casey of The Seattle Times found the game to be "innovative" but found that the overall experience was "somewhat bumpy and unpredictable".

Xplora1 received three awards from the Academy of Interactive Arts & Sciences for:

- Best Interactive Product of 1994,
- Best Musical, and
- Best use of Music

The game sold more than 100,000 copies globally and more than 2,000 copies in Australia.

== See also ==
- 77 Million Paintings - A computer software program featuring music by Peter Gabriel's contemporary, Brian Eno, amongst artwork
- MusicVR - A similar series of musical concept games designed by fellow musician, Mike Oldfield.
- Prince Interactive - A similar game designed by the musician, Prince.
