= Assassin 2015 =

- Developer: BlueSky Software
- Publisher: Inscape
- Platform: Windows
- Release: 1996

Assassin 2015 is a 1996 video game developed by BlueSky Software and published by Inscape.

== Gameplay ==
Jack Butcher, a renegade marine, begins the game having already assassinated Dr. Jacques Arnoud, a scientist needed for the creation of a new combat droid called the Genocide 350. After his identity is discovered, he becomes a prisoner inside MicroKomm headquarters and must fight his way out while pursued by mechanized troops throughout the building. The player moves through the facility using basic first‑person controls—firing, strafing, and moving forward—while optionally activating a self‑aiming crosshair that enables a special weapon once energy has regenerated sec14sec15. Shields automatically replenish after damage, but once depleted, incoming hits reduce health directly. A communications expert contacts the player periodically to warn about traps and provide guidance through the building sec18. Clearing each room triggers a short cut‑sequence showing the destruction of the final enemy in that encounter.

== Reception ==
Reception

Review scores
Publication	Score
Computer Games Magazine	2/5
Gamecenter	1/5
GameSpot	5.3/10
PC Gamer	35%
PC Player	2/5
Power Play	44%
PC Spiel	89%

Computer Games Magazine only recommended Assassin 2015 if you find it in a bargain bin for $10.00. GameSpot liked the plot in Assassin 2015 but criticised the gameplay.
