= The Game Awards =

Annual video game awards ceremony

- Previous: The Game Awards 2025; Next: The Game Awards 2026
- Awarded for: Achievements in the video game industry
- Venue: Peacock Theater
- Country: United States
- Hosted by: Geoff Keighley
- Preshow host: Sydnee Goodman
- First award: December 5, 2014; 11 years ago
- Website: thegameawards.com

The Game Awards is an annual awards ceremony honoring achievements in the video game industry. Established in 2014, the shows are produced and hosted by game journalist Geoff Keighley. After working on its predecessor, the Spike Video Game Awards, for over ten years, Keighley worked with several video game companies to create the show. In addition to the awards, the Game Awards features premieres of upcoming games and new information on previously announced titles. The show's reception is generally mixed: it has been lauded for its announcements and criticized for its lack of acknowledgement of events, use of promotional content and treatment of award winners.

After the first ceremony at the AXIS in Las Vegas, each show is held in the Peacock Theater in Los Angeles. Keighley has declined several offers from television networks to air the show. The Game Awards has a committee composed of representatives of companies such as Microsoft, Nintendo, and Sony. They select over a hundred video game press organizations eligible for nomination, and vote on games in the show's categories. Keighley and the committee itself do not participate in voting. Games released before a specific date in November are eligible for nomination. Games released after that date are eligible for the following year's awards. Most winners are determined by a mixed vote from 90% of the voting jury and 10% of fan votes.

== History ==
=== Background ===
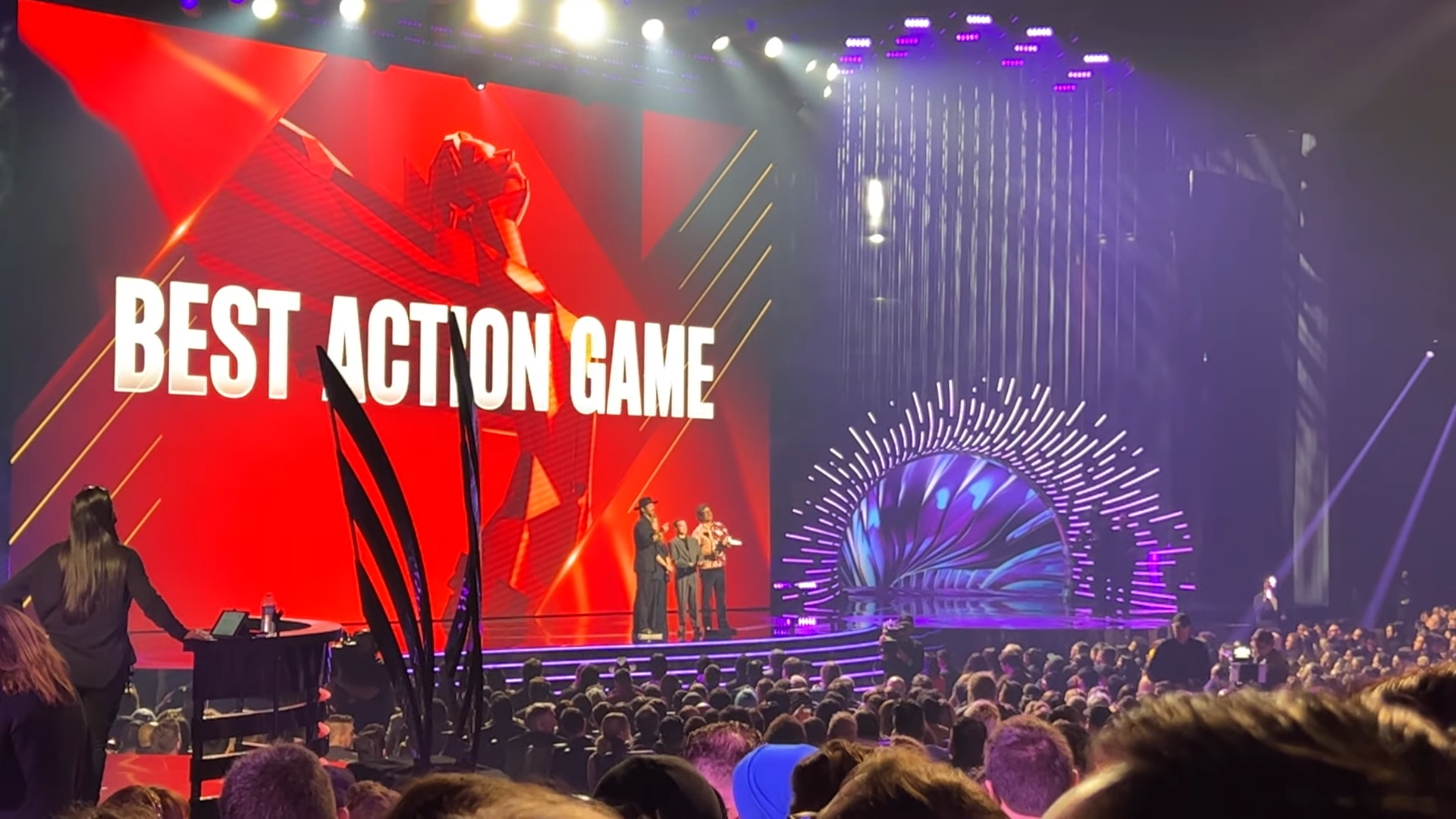
Best Action Game award being presented at the Game Awards 2022

In 1994, Canadian games journalist Geoff Keighley had been part of the first televised awards show for video games, Cybermania '94. Keighley, as a teenager, had been brought on to help write material for the celebrity hosts such as William Shatner and Leslie Nielsen. The show was not considered successful, aimed more for comedy than celebration, but it prompted him to develop something akin to the Academy Awards for video games later in his career.

Keighley had subsequently worked on the Spike Video Game Awards (VGA), which ran from 2003 to 2013. The show was broadcast on Spike TV near the end of each calendar year, and was designed to honor video games released during that year. Keighley served as the producer and often host for these shows. While the network had shown strong support for the award show through 2012, having brought Samuel L. Jackson to host the show, Keighley found Spike less interested in pursuing the 2013 show, partially due to the network seeking less male-oriented programming. Spike opted to rename the awards from VGA to VGX as to reflect that they wanted to focus more on next-generation games that were being ushered in by the onset of the eighth generation of consoles, as well as bringing comedian Joel McHale to co-host alongside Keighley. Additionally, the show was reduced to a one-hour presentation, which was first streamed online before airing on television. The 2013 show was considered to be disappointing and aimed as a more commercial work rather than a celebration of video game achievements. Spike offered to continue the show in 2014, but would be limited to streaming media rather than broadcast; Keighley declined, and Spike's show was discontinued.

Keighley worked with several entities within the industry, including console hardware manufacturers Sony, Microsoft, and Nintendo, and several large publishers, to financially back and craft a new awards show, the Game Awards. He invested around US$1 million of his own personal funds to support the new show, and was able to secure space at The AXIS theater in Las Vegas for hosting the live event. Without a broadcaster, Keighley and the other producers agreed to livestream the show on the consoles' networks and on Valve's Steam service to be able to reach a much larger audience than Spike TV previously had.

=== The Game Awards ===
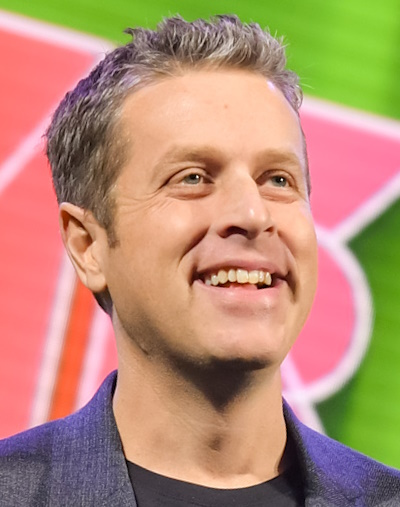
Geoff Keighley, host of the Game Awards

Since the 2014 show, Keighley has been able to secure the larger Peacock Theater (formerly Microsoft Theater) in Los Angeles to host the event. He has worked to partner with multiple streaming services around the globe for the show, which has been a move appreciated by several of the Game Awards' partners since the show's inception. Keighley has been approached by broadcast networks offering to air the show, but he had refused these offers, allowing them to keep the freedom of how they present and structure the show. The 2019 show included a simulcast in partnership with Sony Pictures for select Cinemark movie theaters throughout the United States. The Game Awards 2020 was not held in a live theater due to the COVID-19 pandemic and was instead hosted virtually. The 2021 show was held live again at the Microsoft Theater with a reduced audience due to ongoing COVID-19 precautions.

An illustration of the award statuette, designed by Keighley and Weta Workshop

Keighley considered it important that the Game Awards are aimed to favorably present the interest of gamers and the industry at large, as well as being welcoming to celebrities and others that have shown interest in video games. While the Game Awards are principally an awards show, Keighley knew the importance of having additional content, having seen other experiments of video game awards shows that were only dedicated to awards fail due to lack of audience. Keighley believed that the Game Awards should fall somewhere between the entertainment venues that are used for the Academy Awards and the standard award presentation used for the Game Developers Choice Awards, and wanted a balance of material. Through the Spike VGX and into the Game Awards, Keighley has engaged with games studios to bring reveals of new games alongside the awards. He considers the crowning moment of this approach was being able to secure the first gameplay reveal of The Legend of Zelda: Breath of the Wild at the Game Awards 2014. Keighley encourages game studios to provide any content that might be deemed exciting or that can pique interest, even if these games are at an early stage of development, and then makes the selection of which games and trailers to feature. Keighley subsequently works with those studios about how to best position their trailers to have the most impact; for example, in the 2018 show, he and Nintendo worked on a trailer reveal for the Persona 5 character Joker in Super Smash Bros. Ultimate that appeared to start as a teaser for a new game in the series.

Since the show's launch, Keighley has solicited input from fans on how to improve the show, typically while at trade shows and conventions in months ahead of the show. For 2020, with the COVID-19 pandemic causing cancellations of many of these events, Keighley invited about one hundred fans to private chats with himself and other top organizers of the program to help solicit their input. The Game Awards were still held in 2020 and 2021, though with a limited invited audience for the latter and limited interactions of hosts, presenters and nominees due to restrictions set by California and Los Angeles in regards to large gatherings in indoor spaces. The 2022 show returned to a full live audience as these government restrictions were since lifted. The 2026 show will be the first to air on a major television streaming platform Disney+ in addition to the traditional web-based streaming outlets.

In conjunction with the show, digital storefronts such as Steam, Xbox Games Store, Nintendo eShop, and PlayStation Store offer the nominated games on sale leading up to and a few days after the event. The statuette awarded to the selected games was designed by collaboration between Keighley and Weta Workshop. It is meant to represent "the evolution of the video game medium by way of an angel that ascends through digital building blocks". In 2019, a Game Festival featuring demos of upcoming games was held on Steam. In 2021, Keighley hosted the podcast Inside the Game Awards in partnership with Spotify. In June 2023, Keighley hosted the Game Awards 10-Year Celebration, a performance of video game music at the Hollywood Bowl by the Los Angeles Philharmonic.

=== Shows ===
List of Game Awards
Event	Date	Game of the Year	Venue	Viewers (millions)
2014	December 5	Dragon Age: Inquisition	The AXIS (Las Vegas)	1.9
2015	December 3	The Witcher 3: Wild Hunt	Microsoft Theater (Los Angeles)	2.3
2016	December 1	Overwatch	Microsoft Theater (Los Angeles)	3.8
2017	December 7	The Legend of Zelda: Breath of the Wild	Microsoft Theater (Los Angeles)	11.5
2018	December 6	God of War	Microsoft Theater (Los Angeles)	26.2
2019	December 12	Sekiro: Shadows Die Twice	Microsoft Theater (Los Angeles)	45.2
2020	December 10	The Last of Us Part II	Virtual event (Note: Held virtually due to the COVID-19 pandemic)	83
2021	December 9	It Takes Two	Microsoft Theater (Los Angeles)	85
2022	December 8	Elden Ring	Microsoft Theater (Los Angeles)	103
2023	December 7	Baldur's Gate 3	Peacock Theater (Los Angeles)	118
2024	December 12	Astro Bot	Peacock Theater (Los Angeles)	154
2025	December 11	Clair Obscur: Expedition 33	Peacock Theater (Los Angeles)	171
2026	December 10	—N/a	Peacock Theater (Los Angeles)	—N/a

== Process ==
The Game Awards has an advisory committee which includes representatives from hardware manufacturers Microsoft, Sony, Nintendo, and AMD, along with several game publishers. This committee selects game news organizations that are able to nominate and subsequently vote on the video games in several categories. The advisory committee otherwise does not participate in the nomination or voting process. During the nomination round, each of the news outlets provides a list of games in several categories; games for the esports-related categories are chosen by a specific subset of these outlets. The committee compiles the nominations and selects the most-nominated games for voting by these same outlets. Prior to 2017, there were 28 industry experts and representatives that selected the winners, while the awards from 2017 onwards have used over 50 such experts. In 2019, non-English media publications were added to the jury. As of 2024, there are over one hundred media publications around the world that were chosen as juries. Winners are determined by a blended vote between the voting jury (90%) and public fan voting (10%) via social platforms and the show's website.

Generally, only games released before a specific date in November are eligible for being nominated in the year's awards. As the jury must make their nominations in the weeks prior to this date, this may leave some anticipated games that are scheduled for release just before that date to be underrepresented in the nominations, since the jury must go by pre-release review copies and not the final version. Any games releasing after the November deadline (which varies every year) are eligible for the next year's ceremony. Game expansions, seasonal content, downloadable content, remakes, and remasters are also eligible across all award categories.

== Categories ==
=== Video games and media ===
Current categories
Categories	First awarded
Game of the Year	2014
Best Independent Game	2014
Best Mobile Game (Note: Presented as Best Mobile/Handheld Game from 2014 to 2016, and split into two categories (Best Mobile Game and Best Handheld Game) in 2017)	2014
Best Narrative	2014
Best Score and Music (Note: Presented as Best Score/Soundtrack in 2014 and 2015, Best Music/Sound Design in 2016, and Best Score/Music from 2017 to 2019)	2014
Best Performance	2014
Games for Impact (Note: Presented as Games for Change in 2014)	2014
Best Action/Adventure Game	2014
Best Role Playing Game	2014
Best Fighting Game	2014
Best Family Game	2014
Best Sports/Racing Game	2014
Best Multiplayer (Note: Presented as Best Online Experience in 2014)	2014
Most Anticipated Game (Note: Not presented in 2018 and 2019)	2014
Best Art Direction	2015
Best Game Direction (Note: Adapted from Developer of the Year)	2016
Best VR/AR Game (Note: Presented as Best VR Game in 2016)	2016
Best Action Game	2016
Best Sim/Strategy Game (Note: Presented as Best Strategy Game from 2014 to 2019)	2016
Best Audio Design (Note: Previously presented as part of Best Music/Sound Design in 2016)	2017
Best Ongoing Game	2017
Best Debut Indie Game (Note: Presented as Fresh Indie Game in 2019 and Best Debut Game in 2020)	2017
Best Community Support	2019
Players' Voice (Note: Presented as Player's Voice in 2019 and 2020)	2019
Innovation in Accessibility	2020
Best Adaptation	2022

Discontinued categories
Categories	First awarded	Last awarded
Best Remaster	2014	2014
Best Shooter (Note: Replaced by Best Action Game)	2014	2015
Developer of the Year (Note: Adapted into Best Game Direction)	2014	2015
Best Student Game (Note: Presented as Student Game Award in 2017)	2017	2018

=== Esports and creators ===
Current categories
Categories	First awarded
Best Esports Athlete (Note: Presented as Esports Player of the Year from 2014 to 2016 and Best Esports Player from 2017 to 2019 and 2021)	2014
Best Esports Team (Note: Presented as Esports Team of the Year from 2014 to 2016)	2014
Best Esports Game (Note: Presented as Esports Game of the Year from 2014 to 2016)	2015
Content Creator of the Year (Note: Adapted from Trending Gamer)	2018
Best User Creation	2026

Discontinued categories
Categories	First awarded	Last awarded
Best Fan Creation	2014	2016
Trending Gamer (Note: Split into Content Creator of the Year and Global Gaming Citizens)	2014	2017
Chinese Fan Game Award	2017	2017
Best Esports Moment	2018	2018
Best Esports Host	2018	2020
Best Esports Coach	2018	2023
Best Esports Event	2018	2023

=== Honorary awards ===
Categories	First awarded	Last awarded
Industry Icon Award	2014	2018
Global Gaming Citizens (Note: Not presented in 2022, 2023, and 2025)	2018	—N/a
Future Class	2020	2023
Game Changer	2024	—N/a

== Reception ==
The show has received praise for its announcements. However, commentators have criticized the Game Awards for being overly promotional and commercialized. The ratio of time spent on honoring awards winners compared to advertisements for upcoming games is a common point of criticism. After news of Activision Blizzard's sexual misconduct scandal broke, Keighley opened the 2021 awards show with a statement denouncing abuse in the industry. The statement was criticized for failing to refer to Activision Blizzard by name and appearing to be designed to preserve "valuable industry relationships" over taking a more meaningful stance. The incident raised questions about the show's close relationship with the industry and unwillingness to paint business partners in a bad light. The 2023 ceremony was criticized for allowing celebrity guests several minutes to speak while winners were allocated thirty seconds before being prompted to "wrap it up" and cut off by music.

In 2025, the Future Class programme was put on indefinite hiatus, with members of previous class stating they felt "tokenised" and "were effectively props".

== Records ==
=== Franchises ===
The Final Fantasy franchise has received the most awards from the Game Awards as of 2025.

Franchise	Publisher	Awards	Nominations	Ref.
Final Fantasy	Square Enix	10	32	
God of War	Sony Interactive Entertainment	9	19	
The Last of Us	Sony Interactive Entertainment	9	15	
Clair Obscur	Kepler Interactive	9	13	
Forza	Xbox Game Studios	8	12	
Baldur's Gate	Larian Studios	8	10	
Overwatch	Blizzard Entertainment	7	12	
Mario	Nintendo	6	21	(Note: Mario franchise: Super Mario series – 3 wins, 16 nominations; Mario Kart series – 3 wins, 5 nominations)
The Legend of Zelda	Nintendo	6	16	
Elden Ring	Bandai Namco Entertainment	6	15	
Hellblade	Ninja Theory	5	9	
Astro Bot	Sony Interactive Entertainment	5	8	
Resident Evil	Capcom	4	21	(Note: Resident Evil series: 2017 – 1 win, 3 nominations; 2019 – 4 nominations; 2020 – 2 nominations; 2021 – 2 wins, 6 nominations; 2022 – 1 nomination; 2023 – 1 win, 4 nominations; 2025 – 1 nomination)
Red Dead	Rockstar Games	4	10	
Destiny	Bungie	3	23	
Death Stranding	Sony Interactive Entertainment	3	11	
Hades	Supergiant Games	3	10	
Doom	Bethesda Softworks	3	9	
Splatoon	Nintendo	3	7	
The Witcher	CD Projekt	3	7	
Grand Theft Auto	Rockstar Games	3	4	
Call of Duty	Activision	2	27	
Uncharted	Sony Interactive Entertainment	2	13	
Ghost	Sony Interactive Entertainment	2	9	
Pokémon	Nintendo	2	8	
Fire Emblem	Nintendo	2	7	(Note: Fire Emblem series: 2016 – 2 nominations; 2017 – 2 nominations; 2019 – 2 wins, 2 nominations; 2023 – 1 nomination)
Street Fighter	Capcom	2	7	(Note: Street Fighter series: 2014 – 1 nomination; 2016 – 1 win, 2 nominations; 2018 – 1 nomination; 2020 – 1 nomination; 2023 – 1 win, 3 nominations)
Black Myth	Game Science	2	5	
Metroid	Nintendo	2	5	
Metal Gear Solid	Konami	2	4	
Dragon Age	Electronic Arts	2	3	

== See also ==
- Summer Game Fest
