= Quest for Fame =

1995 video game

- Developer: Virtual Music (Note: Additional work for the PlayStation version by Sony Computer Entertainment Japan.)
- Publishers: IBM; Sony Computer Entertainment (PS)
- Platforms: OS/2, Windows, PlayStation, Arcade, Classic Mac OS
- Release: 1995
- Genre: Music video game
- Mode: Single player

Quest for Fame is a 1995 interactive music CD-ROM and video game developed by Virtual Music Entertainment and published by IBM.

== Gameplay ==
The gameplay shows the player entering locations such as a garage, a studio, and bars where members of Aerosmith perform several classic rock songs. The player uses a pick‑shaped controller included with the game to accompany these songs by tapping in rhythm. The game presents this as a virtual rock‑and‑roll experience in which the player follows along with the music while interacting through the specialized input device.

== Development ==
BMG Interactive marketed Quest for Fame in Europe.

== Reception ==
Reception

Review scores
Publication	Score
Liverpool Echo	5/5
PC Team	18/20
PC Joker	39%
Power Play	76%
PC Player	79%

Newsday called Quest for Fame one step above air guitar.

Quest for Fame was named one of the top 100 CD-ROMs by PC Magazine.
