= The Residents: Freak Show =

CD-ROM by The Voyager Company

The Residents: Freak Show is an interactive music CD-ROM by The Voyager Company. A few years earlier they had released a similar work based on The Residents entitled Twenty Twisted Questions. The project was spearheaded by James Ludtke.

== Critical reception ==
The Atlantic deemed it one of the most influential early CD-Roms. Wired noted it was "widely hailed as the best CD-ROM ever". PC Mag listed it as one of the top 100 CD-ROM titles. The book Resolution felt the title opened up the "poetic possibilities" of the interactive medium. The Book is Dead deemed it "obscure". The Voyager Company themselves noted the limitations of sound in the medium which had the potential of alienating players. The New York Times felt the game offered the player a chance to view the characters' "sad yet oddly exhilarating lives".
