= Have a Bad Day =

Studio album by the Residents
- Released: 1996
- Length: 47:59
- Label: Euroralph

The Residents chronology
Bad Day on the Midway (1995)	Have a Bad Day (1996)	Wormwood: Curious Stories from the Bible (1998)

Professional ratings
Review scores
Source	Rating
AllMusic	4/5 stars

Have a Bad Day is an album by American art rock band the Residents, released in 1996. This CD features music originally composed to accompany the 1995 CD-ROM adventure game Bad Day on the Midway, also by the Residents.

== Track listing ==
1. "Bad Day on the Midway"
2. "Dagmar, the Dog Woman"
3. "I Ain't Seen No Rats"
4. "Tears of the Taxman"
5. "God's Teardrops"
6. "The Seven Tattoos"
7. "The Marvels of Mayhem"
8. "Lottie the Human Log"
9. "Ugly Liberation"
10. "Daddy's Poems"
11. "The Red Head of Death"
12. "Timmy"
