= Jump: The David Bowie Interactive CD-ROM =

1994 multimedia CD-ROM video game

- Developer: Ion
- Platforms: Mac OS, Windows 3.1x
- Release: 1 June 1995
- Genre: Interactive music CD-ROM
- Mode: Single-player

Jump: The David Bowie Interactive CD-ROM is a 1995 interactive music CD-ROM developed by Ion, featuring the music of David Bowie. It allows players the ability to remix the David Bowie single Jump They Say, as well as access other multimedia including interviews from the artist.

== Gameplay ==
Players navigate the features of Jump by exploring the rooms inside a building, with each room representing a mode. In the David Bowie suite, styled as an office, players can view a ten-minute video interview of David Bowie and photographs. The video suite allows users to edit the video of the Jump They Say music video by choosing which of five simultaneous video tracks to play during the song. The Room 2901 suite allows players to view four music videos by David Bowie: Jump They Say, Black Tie White Noise, Miracle Goodnight and You've Been Around. Rooms contain interactive objects that display animations when clicked.

== Development ==
Jump was developed by Los Angeles multimedia company Ion, led by software designer Ty Roberts with permission from David Bowie. However, Bowie had minimal creative input into the design of the CD-ROM.

== Reception ==
Critics generally found Jump insubstantial. The Seattle Times praised the "elegant" quality of its visuals and audio, but found the software's creative tools were limited and did not reveal enough about David Bowie to justify purchase. Electronic Entertainment viewed the software to be fun to explore, but felt other interactive software provided a richer experience due to its limited options, slow performance and "dull" accompanying interview. Hyper suggested the game was "for fans only", considering there was not enough content to hold a player's attention, as the lead song was "boring", and the included interview was "agonisingly slow".
