= Quantum Gate (video game) =

1993 video game

- North American Windows cover art
- Developer: Hyperbole Studios
- Publisher: Media Vision Technology
- Director: Greg Roach
- Producer: Halle Eavelyn
- Programmer: Mark Arend
- Artist: Howard Lee
- Writer: Greg Roach
- Composer: Paul Wayne Hiaumet
- Platforms: Windows 3.x, Macintosh, PlayStation, Sega Saturn
- Release: 1993
- Genre: Interactive movie
- Mode: Single-player

Quantum Gate is an interactive movie created by Hyperbole Studios in 1993 and published by the now defunct Media Vision Technology. Quantum Gate sold over 100,000 units (a commercial benchmark achieved by few titles in 1993) and was regarded as a technical and artistic breakthrough in PC entertainment design. The game also received a novelization and was followed by a sequel titled Vortex.

== Plot ==
The player takes on the role of Private Drew Griffin, an army medical student in the year 2057 who is recruited by the UN on a secret mission to an alien world where water is scarce.

During the mission briefing Drew discovers that an advanced environmental simulation program called Earth-5 has predicted that there are only five years remaining before irreversible ecological damage caused by industrialisation, pollution and the overuse and destruction of natural resources will cause the Earth's demise. The Eden Initiative, of which this mission is the major part, is a project aimed at saving Earth from this Armageddon. The key to this is the rare mineral iridium oxide, found on the harsh alien planet AJ3905. AJ3905 is a world accessible only through an interplanetary device called the Quantum Gate and the mission involves a series of mining expeditions to extract the mineral and bring it back to Earth. However, AJ3905's hellish atmosphere consists of a poisonous, caustic gas that promises an agonising death for unprotected humans which requires the wearing of a protective suit (known as a 'Tophat'). Furthermore, it is occupied by a hostile life form that appear as frighteningly skeletal anthropomorphic forms through the Tophat's virtual reality display. It is the role of Griffin and his fellow army recruits to protect the scientific mining crew during their repeated forays to the planet.

During mission downtime, the player's interaction with other characters such as the commanding officer, Colonel Saunders, and the inventor of the Quantum Gate, Dr. Elizabeth Marks, start to raise concerns about the nature of the mission. Further enhanced when Griffin's apparently paranoid army buddy, Private Michaels, starts telling tales of great conspiracy to hide the true agenda of the Eden Initiative. These start to suggest to the player that the nature of the planet itself and the possible reason for the protective suits are elaborate fabrications. The extreme interpretation is that the Earth is doomed no matter what and instead of protecting peaceful miners from a hostile alien race, the army is involved in the genocide of a native species prior to human colonisation.

Between these sequences and the occasional training mission or visit to the planet, a series of flashbacks and electronic messages from home reveal a dark backstory about Private Griffin. Through events for which Griffin feels remorse his girlfriend has become partially disfigured, although it is never made clear what those events were or that they were even Griffin's fault. They appear to have spurred Griffin, who had previously been pursuing a promising career in medicine, to run away from home and join the military. The full history of Griffin is never completely explained in the game and the details are kept deliberately vague and unresolved leaving the player to decide whether Griffin's remorse is for an accident for which he is to blame, or merely for having run away. Additional touches such as the heavy censorship of messages from home suggest that, for the army recruits at least, participation in this mission may be punitive.

During the final mission of the game Griffin is attacked and immobilised. His Tophat and life support system start to fail and an alien looms over him. Despite his pleas for mercy the alien works his helmet loose and removes it. However, without the VR filter, the planet is revealed as a green and living world, and the demonlike alien as a curious-looking female humanoid (revealed in the sequel to be a peaceful, winged race known as the Alylinde). Griffin's last words as the screen goes black are "My God. They're human".

== Gameplay ==
As the game progresses the overall feel becomes increasingly dark; from the initial briefing which consists of confronting images of dying animals, famine and industrial pollution, through the increasingly paranoid rantings of Private Michaels to the distressed and teary messages from Griffin's mother and girlfriend. The gameplay itself is extremely linear in nature, as is normally exhibited by interactive movies and the player's input is limited to conversing with other characters (through a choice of pre-existing phrases) and some involvement during missions. The game is unusual in that the player 'wins' only by having their character die (or possibly fall unconscious as this, like so much else in the game, is never made completely clear). This allows the shock-conclusion reveal of the true nature of the planet and its inhabitants, and hence the most likely truth of the character's own participation in genocide. For these reasons the game and its message are quite confronting.

== Reception ==
Computer Gaming World said in March 1994 that Quantum Gate had good acting and was "one of the most engaging CD titles yet to appear". In April 1994 the magazine said that it "packs a good entertainment punch" and "interesting", but "it's still a game—not the great leap beyond the marketing folks would have you believe". Charles Ardai in June 1994 complained that Quantum Gate was—contrary to its marketing—"hardly a game at all [but] a movie", as players could not affect the plot. He denounced the first-person tank sequences as "the less said about which the better", and said that as a game "Quantum Gate deserves a scathing review". Ardai praised it as a science-fiction movie (the best since Blade Runner), however, citing "simply outstanding" acting and video and comparing the "shockingly adult and shockingly good" script to Philip K. Dick and Fredric Brown. He concluded that Quantum Gate "is a hell of a good movie, period, with a story that sticks with you long after the final credits roll". The game was reviewed in 1994 in Dragon #212 by Ken Rolston in the "Eye of the Monitor" column. Rolston states, "I casually recommend it as a quick, simple entertainment, and of special interest to students of narrative multimedia, but it's not much of a game, and not completely successful on its own narrative terms."

James V. Trunzo reviewed Quantum Gate in White Wolf #47 (Sept., 1994), rating it a 3 out of 5 and stated that "In the end, Quantum Gate is far more flash than substance."

== Production ==
Greg Roach wrote and designed the title which follows the story of Drew Griffin, a military recruit in a base on a far off planet, preparing for a war with an alien species.

Originally the two releases, Quantum Gate and The Vortex, were written and designed as a single story/experience, but the publisher, Media Vision, exercised an acceleration clause in the development contract and demanded the title months ahead of the original release date - causing the developers to have to split the title into two. As a result, The Vortex was redesigned to allow its story to stand alone.

== Sequel ==
Reception

Review score
| Publication | Score |
|---|---|
| Computer Gaming World | 2/5 |

Vortex (also known as The Vortex: Quantum Gate II) is the 1994 sequel to Quantum Gate by Hyperbole Studios for Mac and Windows. The game tells the adventures of an army grunt in a futuristic (but medieval like) society where water is scarce. The game was developed using Softimage and VirtualCinema.

Entertainment Weekly gave the game a C.
