= Wormwood: Curious Stories from the Bible =

Studio album by the Residents
- Released: 1998
- Genres: Experimental; talking blues
- Length: 60:13

The Residents chronology
Have a Bad Day (1996)	Wormwood: Curious Stories from the Bible (1998)	Wormwood Live (1999)

Professional ratings
Review scores
Source	Rating
AllMusic	4.5/5 stars
Pitchfork	4.2/10

Wormwood: Curious Stories from the Bible is a concept album released in 1998 by American art rock band the Residents. The album's purpose is to retell some of the more "curious" stories in the Bible, not to condemn the stories, but to give a greater understanding to them.

== Track listing ==
1. "In the Beginning" - (2:57) is about the creation of the Earth and is entirely instrumental. (Genesis 1-3)
2. "Fire Fall" - (3:34) is about Lot escaping from Sodom and watching his wife turn to salt. (Genesis 19)
3. "They Are the Meat" - (2:40) is about Ezekiel's visions whilst he is forced to eat only bread and sleep on his side. (Ezekiel 4:4-15, 8-11)
4. "Melancholy Clumps" - (1:48) is about Noah building the Ark. (Genesis 6-8)
5. "How to Get a Head" - (4:05) tells us the tale of Salome requesting the head of John the Baptist. (Mark 6:17-29)
6. "Cain and Abel" - (3:34) tells us the story of the jealous Cain killing his brother Abel. (Genesis 4)
7. "Mr. Misery" - (2:19) is about Jeremiah and his suffering. (Jeremiah, Lamentations)
8. "Tent Peg in the Temple" - (2:54) is about the killing of Sisera. (Judges 4-5)
9. "God's Magic Finger" - (2:41) is about the story of King Belshazzar. (Daniel 5)
10. "Spilling the Seed" - (2:44) is about the story of Onan. (Genesis 38)
11. "Dinah and the Unclean Skin" - (2:52) is about the story of Dinah. (Genesis 34)
12. "Bathsheba Bathes" - (2:52) is about King David and Bathsheba. (2 Samuel 11)
13. "Bridegroom of Blood" - (4:57) is about Moses being attacked by God and his wife Zipporah intervening by performing circumcision on their baby. (Exodus 4:24-26)
14. "Hanging by His Hair" - (2:33) tells us the story of Absalom and his death. (2 Samuel 13: 20-30, 16: 20-22, 18: 9-15)
15. "The Seven Ugly Cows" - (2:34) is about Joseph and his visions. (Genesis 39-41)
16. "Burn, Baby Burn" - (2:59) tells us the story of Jephthah sacrificing his daughter. (Judges 11:31-40)
17. "KILL HIM!" - (2:39) is the story of God telling Abraham to sacrifice his son Isaac and gives us an insight into his possible thoughts. (Genesis 22)
18. "I Hate Heaven" - (2:50) is based on the Song of Solomon. (The Song of Solomon)
19. "Judas Saves" - (3:55) is told from the point of view of Judas Iscariot. This song proposes that Judas's betrayal of Jesus was necessary so that people could have their sins forgiven. It also proposes that Judas had been told by God to do so. (Compare the theories put forth by the protagonist of Jorge Luis Borges' short story "Three Versions of Judas", and the Gospel of Judas.) (Mark 14:17-46)
20. "Revelation" - (5:38) is an instrumental inspired by the Book of Revelation, chapters 4-22. (Revelation 4-22)
