= Laser Magnetic Storage International =

Former subsidiary of Philips

- Type: Subsidiary
- Industry: Data storage
- Founded: April 1986; 40 years ago in Mississauga, Ontario
- Defunct: July 1992
- Fate: Reorganized
- Successor: Philips LMS
- Products: Optical and magnetic media
- Parent: Philips; Control Data (1986–1992)

Laser Magnetic Storage International (LMSI) was a subsidiary of Philips that designed and manufactured optical and magnetic media. It began as a joint venture between Philips and Control Data Corporation. It later became Philips LMS.

== Products ==
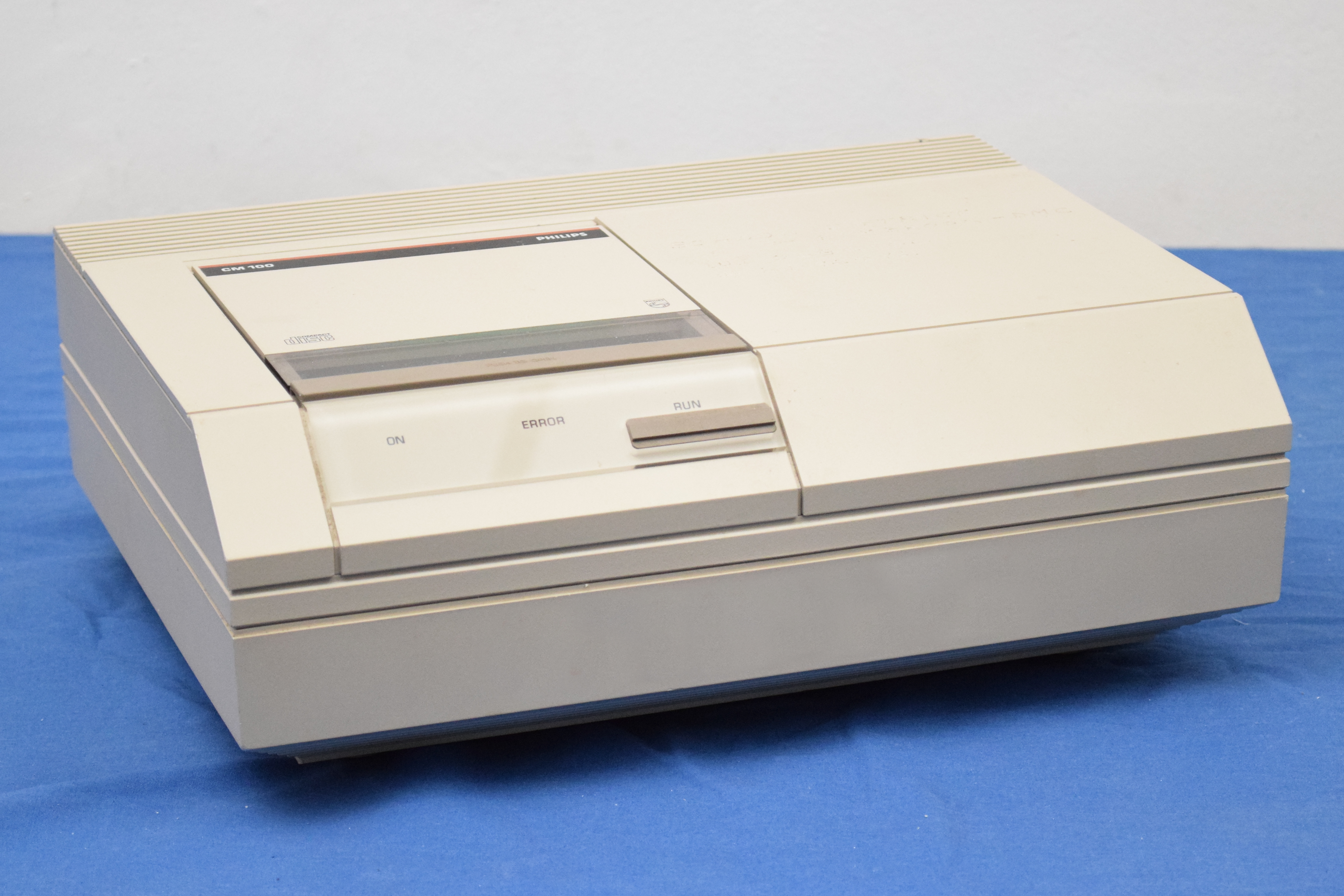
LMSI built the Philips CM 100, the world's first CD-ROM drive (pictured).

LMSI developed a proprietary CD-ROM interface. Early iterations relied on many 7400-series chips – on the CM 153 card for example. Later on, this bus was based on the highly integrated NCR chip – NCR © DIGBIE LMS 97644845-00 0390471 on the CM 260 for example.

External CD-ROMs, LMSI interface

- CDD 401: 1× speed (rebranded CM 221)
- CDD 461: 1× speed
- CDD 462: 1× speed (same as CDD 461 but with multi-session support)
- CM 50: 1× speed
- CM 100: 1× speed – the world's first CD-ROM drive
- CM 121: 1× speed
- CM 221: 1× speed
- CM 225: ?× speed

External CD-ROMs, SCSI interface

- CDD 521: 2× speed
- CDD 522: 2× speed
- CDD 552: ?× speed
- CDD 2000: 4× speed
- CDD 2600: 6× read, 2x write
- CM 110: ?× speed
- CM 231: 1× speed
- CM 234: ?× speed

Internal CD-ROMs, LMSI interface

- CM 201: 1× speed
- CM 205: 1× speed
- CM 206: 2× speed
- CM 210: ?× speed

Internal CD-ROMs, SCSI interface

- CM 121: 1× speed
- CM 201: 1× speed
- CM 204: ?× speed
- CM 212: ?× speed
- CM 214: ?× speed
- PCA80SC: 8× speed

Internal CD-ROMs, IDE interface

- CDD 3610: 6× speed
- CDD 3801: 32× speed
- CDD 4201: ?× speed
- CDD 4401: ?× speed
- CDD 4801: ?× speed
- CM 202: 2× speed
- CM 207: ?× speed
- CM 208: ?× speed
- CM 218: ?× speed

ISA LMSI controller cards

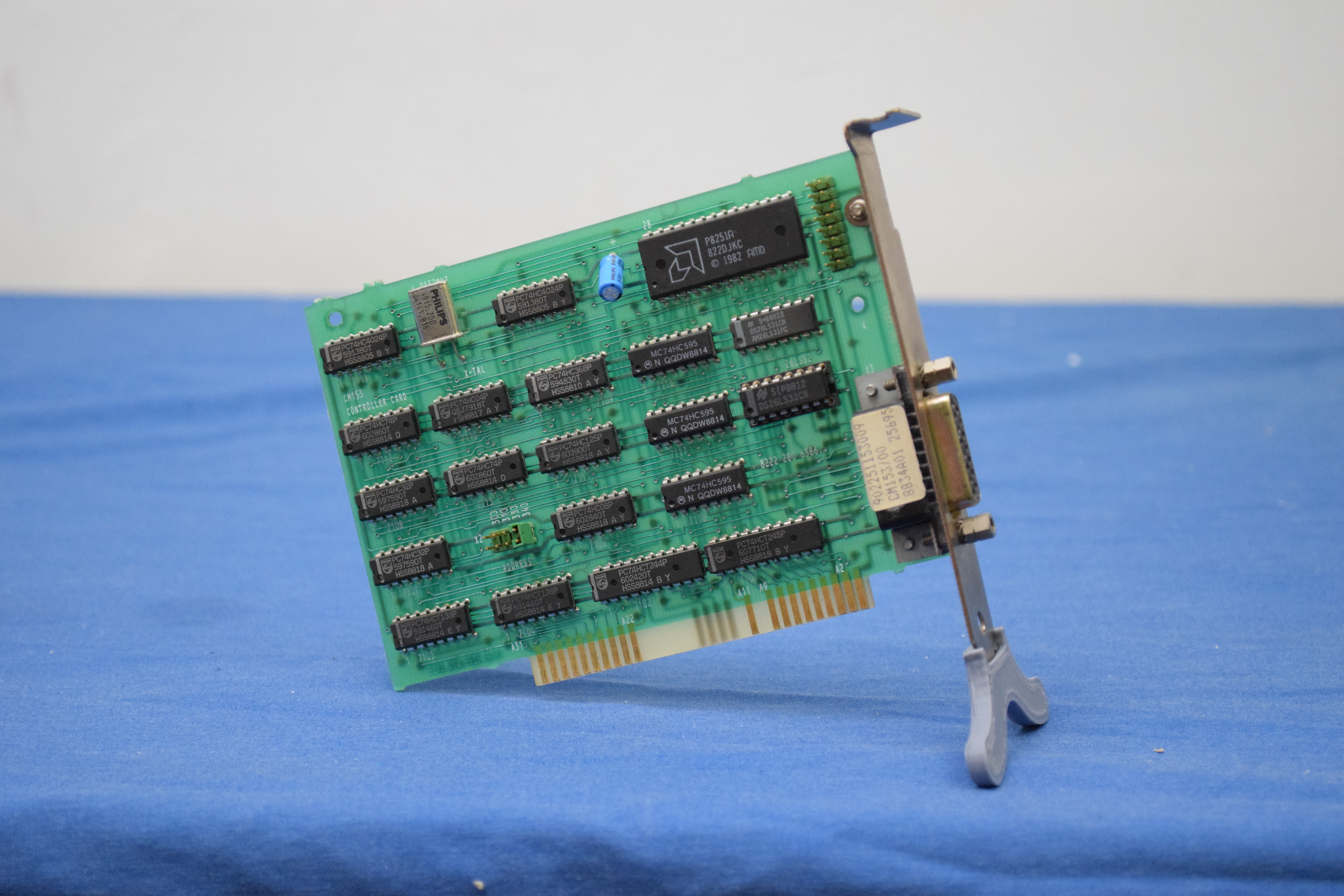
- LMSI CM 153, ISA CD-ROM interface board
  CM 153: 8-bit ISA (coupled with the CM 100 and the CM 201)
- CM 155: 8-bit ISA (coupled with the CM 100, the CM 201 and the CM 210)
- CM 50 interface: 8-bit ISA (coupled with the CM 50)
- CM 250: 8-bit ISA (coupled with the CM 205)
- CM 260: 16-bit ISA (coupled with the CM 206)

Motherboard-integrated

- Certain Tandy Sensation models featured a LMSI controller PCB connected to the motherboard.
- The proprietary 16-pin LMSI CD-ROM interface was relatively short lived and existed on LMSI interface cards and a few ISA sound cards. These sound cards only have internal LMSI connectors, not the external DB-15 connector for external LMSI devices (the DB-15 on sound cards is the game port/UART MPU-401):
  - Sound Blaster Pro 2 CT1620
  - Sound Blaster 16 ASP CSP CT1780
  - Media Vision Jazz 16 LMSI
  - Pro Audio Spectrum LMSI
  - Pro Audio 16 LMSI
  - Generic 16-bit ISA cards with the Aztech AZTPR16 DSP (FCC ID 138-MMSN808)
- Magnetic products were geared towards corporate mini computer environments (like the IBM AS/400):
  - LD 510: internal SCSI MO drive
  - LD 520: external MO drive
  - LD 1200: external WORM drive
  - LD 4100: cartridge optical storage
  - LD 6100: external WORM drive
  - LF 4500: cartridge optical storage
