= John Neary =

American electrical engineer

- Born: Edward John Neary; May 4, 1964; United States
- Died: January 26, 2015
- Education: California Polytechnic State University San Luis Obispo
- Awards: Oscar, Emmy
- Scientific career
- Fields: Electrical Engineering
- Workplaces: Media Vision; Diamond Multimedia; Dolby Laboratories

Edward John Neary (May 4, 1964 – January 26, 2015) was an American electronic engineer, specializing in audio processing equipment for motion pictures and broadcasting, as well as an Academy Award and Emmy Award winner.

Living in California's San Francisco bay area, Neary earned a bachelor of science degree in electronic engineering while at the California Polytechnic State University San Luis Obispo.

Neary has contributed to many notable producers of quality audio equipment including Media Vision, Diamond Multimedia and Dolby Laboratories. Other past employers include the Thomas Engineering Company of Concord, California and Bio-Rad Laboratories of Hercules, California.

== Key Development Accomplishments ==
- Parallel port and ISA based sound cards and sub-systems at Media Vision Technology
- Multi-Function control cards for bio-science imaging devices at Bio-Rad Laboratories
- Encoders, Decoders and Automation equipment for the Broadcast and Cinema markets
- Lighting controllers for the Bob Bondurant School of Racing

== Awards ==
Academy of Motion Picture Arts and Sciences Technical Oscar with Kirk Handley, Ray Meluch, Scott Robinson, and Wilson H. Allen, Neary won an Engineering Award from the Academy of Motion Picture Arts and Sciences for the Design, Development and Implementation of the Dolby CP500 Cinema Processor.

Academy of Television Arts & Sciences Emmy with Jeff Riedmiller, Stew Murrie, Steve Love, Farhad Farahani, Patrick Lummis, Brett Crockett, Charles Robinson and Michael Smithers, Neary accepted an Academy of Television Arts and Sciences Emmy for Outstanding Achievement in Engineering Development for the Dolby Laboratories DP600 Program Optimizer.
