= The Dark Eye (video game) =

1995 video game

- The game's cover art and distinctive character designs were done by artist Bruce Heavin.
- Developer: Inscape
- Publisher: Warner Interactive Entertainment
- Director: Russell Lees
- Artist: Rebekah Behrendt
- Writer: Russell Lees
- Composers: Thomas Dolby; Chuck Mitchell; Blake Leyh
- Platforms: Windows, Mac OS
- Release: 1995
- Genres: First-person adventure, psychological horror
- Mode: Single-player

The Dark Eye is a 1995 first-person psychological horror adventure game developed by Inscape and published by Warner Interactive Entertainment for Windows and Mac.

The game features combined 3D graphics, stop-motion animation and video segments. With its unconventional interface, storyline, and characters, the game's peculiarity became its selling point. The characters are largely lifelike in appearance except for their clay-modeled faces, which are often distorted or feature grotesquely exaggerated features. This near-realism, sometimes referred to as the uncanny valley, contributes to the game's ambiance of unease and anxiety.

Also notable was the use of author William S. Burroughs as a voice actor: Burroughs provided not only the voice for the character of Edwin, but also voiceovers for two slide-show sequences illustrating the short story "The Masque of the Red Death" and the poem "Annabel Lee". Another story, "The Premature Burial", can be found while reading the newspaper during "The Tell-Tale Heart", and the poem "To Helen" can be read while playing the victim in "Berenice".

== Gameplay ==
Structurally, the game is a point-and-click adventure fueled by the macabre stories of Edgar Allan Poe. The player can experience three of the stories ("The Cask of Amontillado", "The Tell-Tale Heart", and "Berenice") from the perspectives of both murderer and victim.

The game presents no choices to make, no life-or-death decisions, and no points; similar to other first-person adventures, like Myst, the game waits for the player to find the next hotspot or location, at which point another video will play to advance the plot. During the portions that are direct interpretations of Poe's stories, the player is constrained to follow the actions of the stories' characters. The player can carry only one item at a time. Much of the animation in The Dark Eye consists of QuickTime movies, either full-screen or smaller looping segments, framed by a static background.

== Story ==
The butler, an early clay character encountered in the game.

The plot principally revolves around "performances" and recitations of Poe's stories, with a new plotline used as a framing device. The game is divided into a "realistic" mode in which the framing plot occurs and a "nightmarish" mode in which Poe's stories are reenacted or narrated.

The game does not specify the year in which it is set, but based on clothing and technology it appears to be in the late 1800s. The player character, whose name is never divulged, is visiting his uncle Edwin. The player first meets Edwin's assistant and then Edwin himself. He later meets Henry, the protagonist's brother, a young businessman who desires the hand of Elise, in marriage. Your character then starts to take ill effects from the paint thinner Edwin was using while painting, and the player character passes out and has a nightmarish dream.

After the protagonist wakes, Henry relates his desperate situation: Edwin deeply disapproves of his love for Elise, since she is much too young for marriage, as well as Henry’s cousin. Another nightmare follows, after which the protagonist encounters Elise, who asks her to give Henry a note. After another nightmare, the player learns that Elise has taken ill. The protagonist sees Henry and gives him Elise's note, then follows him to find that Elise has died. Edwin explains that the ground is too marshy for a proper burial, so Henry, Edwin, and Edwin's Assistant take her body into the basement of the house. Henry requests that a lantern be left nearby in case she revives.

Edwin takes the player aside and states that Henry is mentally unstable. Edwin forges a note from Elise asking Henry to meet her on the cliff outside of the house. The protagonist hands it to Henry, who then dashes out of the house. As Henry stands on the cliff, yelling for Elise, an enormous wave hits him. Watching from afar, the player can see that he is unharmed, although Edwin's assistant approaches Henry and starts a scuffle. In the course of the fight, the assistant shoves Henry off the cliff and into the sea.

Edwin lays the blame for all these events upon the player character, causing him to spiral down into a fit of insanity. Upon returning to reality, the protagonist discovers that Elise, still alive, has broken out of her coffin and gouged out her own eyes. This gruesome sight destroys the protagonist's sanity, and the game ends.

== Development ==
The Dark Eye was art directed by Rebekah Behrendt, whose stated goal was "to subvert the look of computer 3-D art by creating a more homemade feel". She hired Doug Beswick to help animate the project.

The game's soundtrack was composed by Thomas Dolby, along with Chuck Mitchell and Blake Leyh.

As of 2023, The Dark Eye is supported for modern systems via ScummVM since version 2.8.0.

In January 2026, it was announced that the game would be re-released on Steam. Due to trademark conflicts, the title was changed to Edgar Allan Poe's Interactive Horror: 1995 Edition.

== Reception ==
Reception

Review scores
Publication	Score
PC Gamer (US)	80%
NewMedia	"Thumbs Up"

Upon its release, the game attracted little attention from either critics or consumers. Jeffrey Adams of GameSpot gave the game a mixed review, criticizing the game's lack of explanation for gameplay mechanics or goals, but still regarding it as "one of the most original computer games ever created." Conversely, Patrick Arellano of Blasting News hailed it as one of the best obscure horror games of all time.

Entertainment Weekly gave the game an A.

In 2011, Adventure Gamers named The Dark Eye the 85th-best adventure game ever released.
