= Critical Path (video game) =

1994 adventure video game

- Cover art featuring Eileen Weisinger as Kat, one of the main protagonists
- Developer: Mechadeus
- Publisher: Media Vision Technology
- Platforms: PC, Mac
- Release: NA: 1993; EU: 1994
- Genres: Interactive movie, Adventure
- Mode: Single-player

Critical Path is a post-apocalyptic interactive movie adventure video game developed by Mechadeus and published by Media Vision Technology. Critical Path featured real time video which made it appear to be graphically superior to most games of its time. In actuality, the entire game was an interactive movie, where most choices would simply cause the game to progress or end.

== Plot ==
A terrorist biological warfare doomsday event has played out, killing off 90% of the world's population. Many of the survivors are sick or eventually become insane. A group of surviving soldiers attempt to care for survivors and maintain order on their military base. Over time, the situation gradually becomes so dire that the commander orders all sick transported 70 miles (110 km) away to an abandoned village, and orders his troops to open fire on anything within a 30-mile (48 km) radius.

Kat (Eileen Weisinger), a helicopter pilot with uniform markings of the American 1st Cavalry Division, returns from a reconnaissance mission to find her military base destroyed. Nighthorse (Stuart W. Yee) suggests that it was done by a nuclear weapon launched by a Soviet "boomer". Weeks later, Grier (Al Qualls) makes contact with an island 300 miles (480 km) away, which reported to be clear of the sick and capable of receiving refugees. Nighthorse, Grier, Kat and the player, an unnamed soldier, set off in two AH-64 Apache attack helicopters.

En route, the helicopter carrying Grier and the player develops mechanical problems and require a replacement part had by the pair on the other helicopter. The player's helicopter is forced to set down on an island, landing on the rooftop of a factory compound. As Nighthorse and Kat circle, they are fired upon and shot down by a surface-to-air missile. Nighthorse is fatally wounded and orders Kat to deliver the part to the other team.

Kat makes her way to the compound entrance where she makes radio contact with the player, who is in a factory control room. The player relays his situation to Kat: Grier was dead while he was wounded and immobile. The pair had been caught in a booby trap when trying to enter the control room. The player can observe Kat's actions through a series of security cameras as well as Kat's camera headset. However, the headset is quickly damaged, and Kat can no longer receive audio signals from the player. Relying instead on sending simple instructions to Kat through a signaling keypad, the player must guide Kat through the factory to his position. Kat reveals that she has only nine bullets for her Uzi.

The player assists Kat as she makes her way through the factory by activating or deactivating machinery, relaying directional commands and setting off booby traps. The function of the various machinery and booby traps is hinted at in the deranged ramblings contained in a black notebook the player finds on the control room desk. As time passes, the identity of the facility's operator, General Minh (Min Yee) is revealed to the player, as is its function. At first blush, it appears as though Kat is making her way through a steel mill which manufactures large metal crosses. However, Kat eventually discovers a cross partially filled with a white powder she identifies as illicit drugs. She also discovers a torture chamber and meets a prisoner (Brian Bernasconi) who attempts to kill her for her gun. The player saves Kat by electrocuting the inmate who is sitting on an electric chair, and she moves on.

As Kat approaches the rooftop, she is confronted by Minh, carrying an M60 machine gun. The player successfully distracts Minh, while Kat shoots him and makes her way to the player. As the helicopter lifts off, Minh stands up and begins firing on the two as they hover. Kat aims a TV-guided missile at Minh and fires, and the helicopter veers away. Minh is killed in a flaming explosion and Kat, in her chopper, proclaims that she has ten lives and flies off victoriously with the player into the sunset heading back to their military base and then home.

== Development ==
In producing the video portions of Critical Path, Mechadeus made use of computer-generated imagery to create many the game's scenes and AH-64 Apache attack helicopters. Primary filming was conducted using a professional film crew, with Weisinger as her own stunt performer. Much of the game, however, was produced in a low budget manner. For example, Min Yee, who played General Minh, was an executive at Media Vision, while the first two characters killed were played by Mechadeus' lawyers. In all, the game was produced on a budget of US$450,000 (equivalent to $977,000 today).

== Reception ==
Reception

Review score
Publication	Score
Electronic Entertainment	7 out of 10

Critical Path was praised for its superior graphics and computer-generated imagery, but criticized for being little more than a 30-minute movie whose puzzles mostly consisted of pushing the right button at the right time. Computer Gaming World stated in February 1994 that the video and sound "makes the game intense and creates a fast-paced and captivating experience".

The game sold approximately 300,000 units: 125,000 retail sales and 175,000 bundled in other hardware and software packages.

Media Vision's rights to Critical Path were acquired by Virgin Interactive in 1994 when they purchased Media Vision's publishing group.
