= Awards ceremony =

An awards ceremony is a type of ceremony where awards are given out. The ceremony may be arranged by a government organization, a society, a school, a trade association or even a company that specializes in running awards ceremonies. Typically a master of ceremonies presents award winners, speaks to the audience, entertains people, and generally keeps the ceremony moving.

== Ancient Greece ==
The Ancient Greeks held annual competitions for tragedy and comedy, financed by the wealthiest citizens. Awards were given out for best play, best producer and best actor. In the early Olympic Games there were two awards ceremonies. After each event the judges awarded palm branches to the winners. On the last day of the games all the event winners were announced, and crowned with olive garlands. No medals were given, and only the winner was announced, since the runners-up were not considered significant. It was not unusual for the athletes to risk heavy fines and to bribe the judges to be declared winners.

== Modern ceremonies ==
Components of a modern awards ceremony typically include:

- A defined and equitable method of choosing the winners
- A venue, which may be a hotel, theatre or other facility. Dinner and entertainment may also be provided to attendees.
- A master of ceremonies
- Technical equipment such as microphones, speakers and video projectors
- Invitations to selected attendees
- Arrangements for journalists to cover the ceremony
- Certificates or trophies for the winners

== American and British awards ==
The major American awards have evolved into major prime-time television ceremonies, but had small beginnings. The first awards by the Academy of Motion Picture Arts and Sciences were held in 1929 at the Hollywood Roosevelt Hotel three months after the winners had been announced. The Oscar statuettes for best movie, best actress and best actor were given out in a 15-minute ceremony. The Golden Globe Awards were founded in 1944 by eight journalists who had formed the Hollywood Foreign Correspondents Association. They arranged for a luncheon at 20th Century Fox where scrolls were given for best picture, best actress and best actor. The Tony Awards for theatrical plays and musicals were first presented at the Waldorf Astoria New York in 1947. The Academy of Television Arts & Sciences presented the first Emmy Awards at the Hollywood Athletic Club in 1949. The first Grammy Awards were given by the National Academy of Recording Arts and Sciences in 1958, with Volare winning the Best Single award. The first MTV Video Music Awards were presented in 1984. The first Nickelodeon Kids' Choice Awards were presented in 1988. The Game Awards, an award show dedicated to the video game industry, has been livestreamed on YouTube and Twitch annually since its inception in 2014. Another annual awards show for the video game industry, the D.I.C.E. Awards presented by the Academy of Interactive Arts & Sciences, is livestreamed on the video game website IGN (and sometimes GameSpot) every February since 2012.

Major English-language entertainment awards ceremonies in January/February/March/April of each year include the: Academy Awards, American Cinema Editors, American Society of Cinematographers, Art Directors Guild, British Academy of Film and Television Arts, Costume Designers Guild, Critics Choice, Directors Guild of America Awards, Grammy Awards, Independent Spirit Awards, New York Film Critics Circle, Nickelodeon Kids' Choice Awards, Producers Guild of America Awards, Screen Actors Guild Awards, D.I.C.E. Awards, and Writers Guild of America Awards. The Game Awards are livestreamed in December of each year.

In the United Kingdom, there are several British awards including the Brit Awards, the National Television Awards, the British Soap Awards, the British Academy Film Awards, the British Academy Television Awards, the British Academy Games Awards, the Laurence Olivier Awards and the BBC Sports Personality of the Year Award.

== See also ==
- Lists of awards

== Sources ==
- Bathroom Readers Institute, "What the Golden Globes—And 4 Other Major Award Shows—Used to Be Like", Reader's Digest
- Greenwell, T. Christopher; Danzey-Bussell, Leigh Ann; Shonk, David (2014), Managing Sport Events, Human Kinetics, ISBN 978-0-7360-9611-9
- Haines, Marci (1999-01-01), Ancient Greece Gr. 4-6, Rainbow Horizons Publishing, ISBN 978-1-55319-282-4
- Jones, Peter (2 February 2019), "Sick of award ceremonies? So were the ancients", The Spectator
- Nolfi, Joey (January 7, 2020), "2019-2020 awards season calendar: Key dates for the Oscars, Grammys, more", Entertainment Weekly
- Simons, Lisa M. B. (1 July 2014), The First Olympics of Ancient Greece, Capstone, ISBN 978-1-4914-0273-3
- Swaddling, Judith (2011-02-17), Ancient Greek Olympics Gallery, BBC
