= Thunder Board =

8-bit mono personal computer integrated circuit sound card

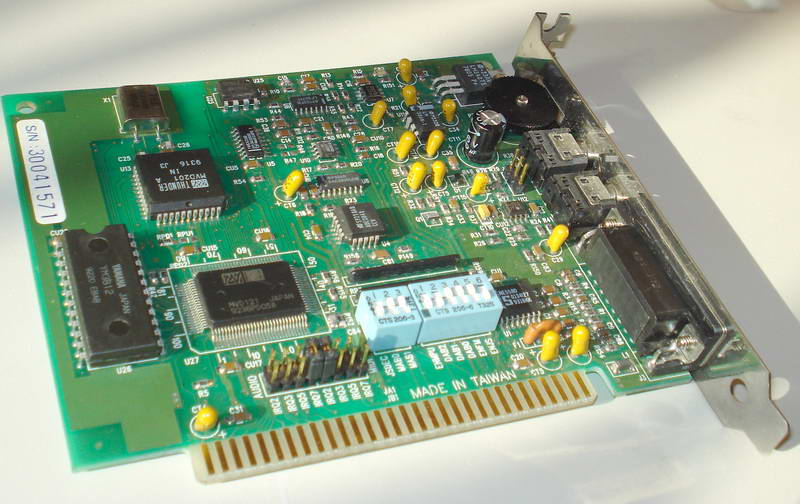
Thunder Board

The Thunder Board was an 8-bit mono personal computer integrated circuit sound card from Media Vision, that had Sound Blaster compatibility at a reduced price. It was widely advertised as "proudly made in the USA"; possibly a reference to the Sound Blaster, manufactured by the competing Singapore-based Creative Technologies. Emulates SB 1.0 and 1.5.

Other features included:

- 8 Bit mono record and playback of .VOC files
- Yamaha YM3812 OPL2 FM Synth
- 2 Watt output
- Joystick Port
- 8 Bit ISA bus
- Volume Control
- Powered Output Jack
- Microphone Input Jack
