= Inscape (company) =

Defunct American video game publisher

- Industry: Video games
- Founded: 1994
- Founder: Michael L. Nash
- Defunct: 1997
- Fate: Acquired by Graphix Zone
- Headquarters: Los Angeles, California, United States
- Products: Bad Day on the Midway; The Dark Eye; Drowned God; Devo Presents Adventures of the Smart Patrol; Assassin 2015; Ravage D.C.X.; Squeezils (Demo); Where's Waldo?: Exploring Geography

Inscape (stylized as iNSCAPE) was an innovative video game publisher in the mid-1990s. Michael L. Nash founded the company, which was jointly funded by two Time Warner subsidiaries, Home Box Office and Warner Music Group, with $5 million in startup money. The company was a blend of talent from the entertainment and programming industries.

== History ==
Michael L. Nash executive produced Freak Show (published by Voyager in 1993) in cooperation with San Francisco-based art collective The Residents, calling it "a cross between 'Sim City' and 'Twin Peaks.'" After Nash founded Inscape in 1994, the group worked with him again to create Inscape's first game in 1995, Bad Day on the Midway, a game CD-ROM Today called "One of the Top Ten Discs of All Time". Bad Day on the Midway was something of a sequel to Freak Show, with both games taking place at traveling carnival.

In 1995, Inscape absorbed two Warner Music Group's interactive divisions: Time Warner Interactive and WarnerActive.

Inscape's next game, The Dark Eye, was released in 1995. At the Electronic Entertainment Expo in May 1996, the company was set to release a new slate of upcoming games: The Egyptian Jukebox; first-person shooter Assassin 2015; conspiracy-themed adventure game Drowned God; 3-D action game Squeezils (Demo); and Ravage D.C.X., a science fiction action adventure game. The company also planned to show two previously announced games, adventure game Devo Presents: Adventures of the Smart Patrol and Where's Waldo?: Exploring Geography.

In February 1997, it was announced that Inscape would be acquired by and become a division of Graphix Zone, after which Inscape was known as Ignite. While four other company executives, vice presidents Rob Sebastian, David Boss, Brock LaPorte and project director Rebekah Behrendt moved with the merger, Nash went his own way. In a June 1997 interview about multimedia and his company, Nash said:

What digitally interactive mixed media offers is the opportunity to make associations among any kind of expression in text, image, or sound and any other expression in any of these media, so it does provide a quantum leap, but this leap is culturally important only if it is used to make experiences that are more densely and dynamically immersive. This is why we named the company Inscape, because we wanted to focus on multimedia's capability to transport us to compelling inner landscapes.

Graphix Zone itself ceased operations in November 1997.
