= Forever Growing Garden =

1993 video game

- CD Cover art
- Developer(s): Communication Wave
- Publisher(s): Media Vision
- Composer(s): Dennis Hysom (Music); Jeff Essex (Sound Effects)
- Platform(s): Windows, Macintosh
- Release: NA: December 31, 1993
- Genre(s): Educational (Botany)
- Mode(s): Single-player

Forever Growing Garden is an educational video game developed by Communication Wave and published by Media Vision in 1993. The game has a simple interface for easy seeding, watering and growing of plants in three locations. The game is programmed so that the growing process can continuously occur even when the computer is off. A French version of the game was also released with the title "Le Jardin Enchanté".

== Gameplay ==
The player does botany in the game first by going to a gardening shop to get some seeds. Some of the plants in the game are entirely fictional, but fun to grow. Each seed type can be planted in an open hole in the ground, then watered with a watering can. The player may choose the time settings for plants to grow, from realistic timing (1 day per growing stage) to very fast timing (1 second per growing stage). Plants can also be removed with the trowel tool. There is also a minigame to catch a gopher and avoid the skunk. Finally, the player can save the garden and create a new one at any time.

There are three scenes where the player can grow plants. The first scene is a Suburban Home, where flowers can be grown. When they are fully bloomed, they can be cut with the shears tool and taken to the Flower Shop to be neatly arranged in a jar. The second scene is a Farming Field, where vegetables and a few flowers can be grown. When the vegetables are ripe, they can be harvested and taken to the Market to be weighed and sold. The third scene is a Medieval Castle, where flower rows and bushes can be grown. When the bushes are fully grown, they can be cut into interesting shapes with the shears tool.

== Availability ==
- "Forever Growing Garden" was released on a compilation CD along with "Always Arthur", "Who Wants Arthur", and "Buster's First Thunderstorm".

== Reception ==
In April 1994, Computer Gaming World said that "this garden simulator will provide much soil-spading fun".
