= Michael L. Nash =

American media executive

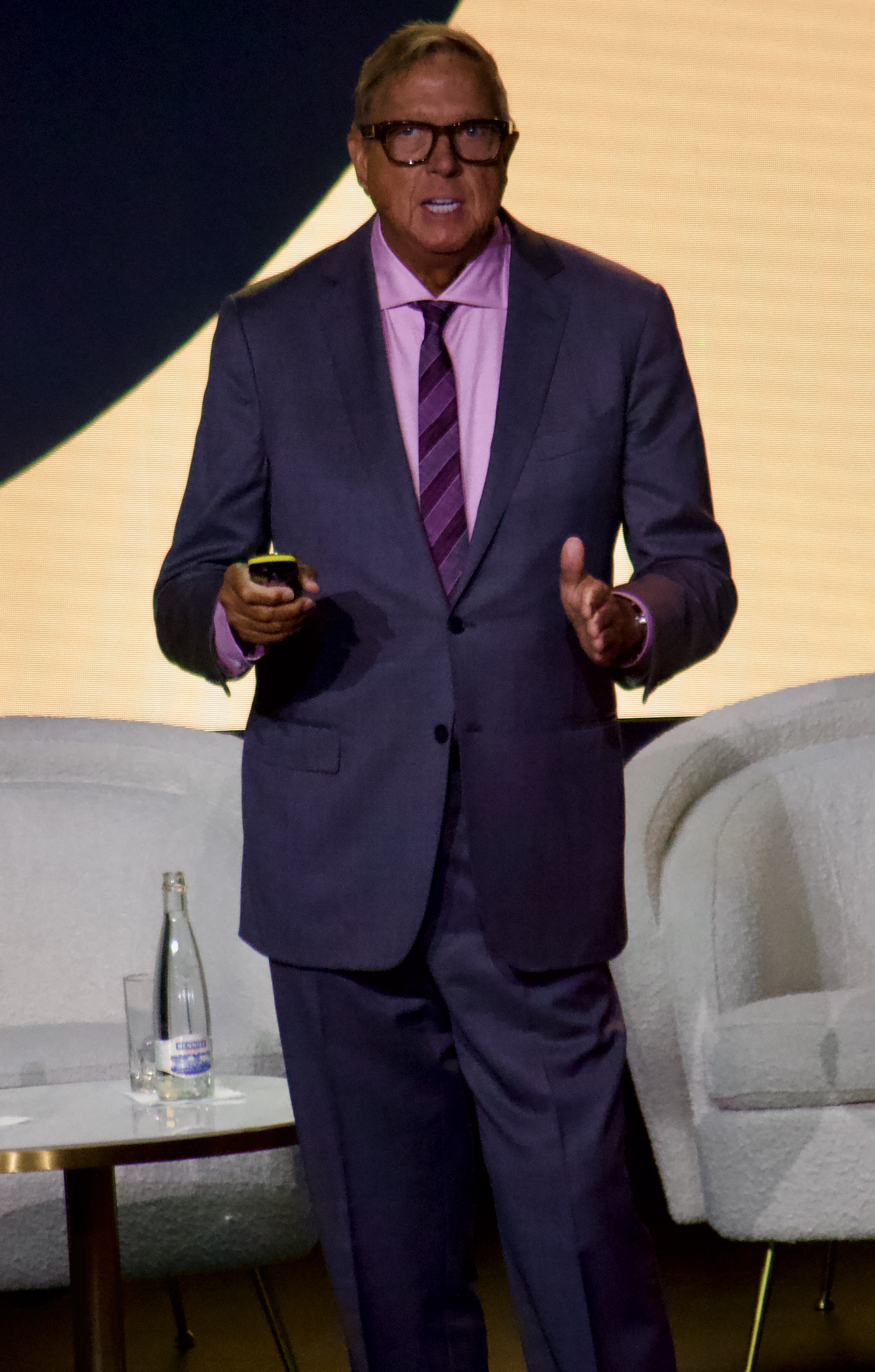
- Nash in 2025
- Occupations: Executive vice president, chief digital officer
- Organization: Universal Music Group

Michael L. Nash is a media executive and the executive vice president and chief digital officer at Universal Music Group. Nash's career includes working in digital strategy at Warner Music Group from 2000 to 2011, following executive roles within the digital media sector.

== Career ==
From 1989 to 1991, Nash served as the Media Arts Curator at the Long Beach Museum of Art. During this tenure, he curated exhibitions, including “The Art of Music Video: Ten Years After” from 1991, which traveled to institutions throughout America until the end of 1992.

Nash founded and served as CEO of Inscape, an interactive entertainment and games publishing joint venture with WMG and HBO. He earlier served as director of the Criterion Collection, working with directors and artists such as Robert Altman, David Bowie, Terry Gilliam, Louis Malle, Nicolas Roeg and John Singleton.

In 1999, Nash was appointed Executive Director of the Madison Project, an IBM-led digital music distribution venture conducted in collaboration with the five major music companies. The project was an early industry-scale initiative to sell music online.

=== Warner Music Group ===
Nash joined Warner Music Group in 2000 as Senior Vice President of Digital Strategy and Business Development. During his tenure, Warner Music Group expanded its digital distribution network through partnerships with telecommunications and technology firms, including AT&T, Amazon, Google, Microsoft, Motorola, and Sony Ericsson. In June 2008, he was named Executive Vice President of Digital Strategy and Business Development, where he oversaw global digital operations until leaving the company in 2011.

In 2005, Nash oversaw WMG’s partnership with Verizon Wireless to offer mobile music video downloads for the launch of its V Cast multimedia service. The agreement established WMG as the first music company to offer music videos via digital download on a mobile platform in the United States.

In 2006, Nash oversaw Warner Music Group’s partnership with YouTube that led WMG to become the first global media company to embrace monetization of user-generated content. The partnership also established WMG’s model to derive revenue from WMG music videos, which included WMG’s partnership with online video service, Hulu. In 2008, The New York Times reported that "Atlantic appears to be the first of the major labels to claim that most of its revenue is coming from digital sales."

Nash was responsible for WMG’s renegotiation with YouTube in 2009 that led to the creation of the WMG premium video platform.

=== Universal Music Group ===
Nash joined Universal Music Group as EVP of digital strategy and was named to the Executive Management Board in 2015. Following UMG's public listing in 2021, Nash has frequently participated in quarterly investor earnings calls to provide updates on the company's digital business development and strategic initiatives.

In this capacity, Nash has overseen global licensing agreements with streaming services, including Amazon, Apple Music, Spotify, and Tencent Music, as part of the organization's shift toward digital-first distribution models.

Addressing industry-wide shifts in generative AI, Nash led initiatives to establish artist rights protections for Universal Music Group's licensing renewals with TikTok and YouTube. Nash also managed Universal Music Group’s partnerships with artificial intelligence and technology companies, including NVIDIA, Stability AI, Splice, Klay, and Udio to establish a sustainable framework for integrating generative AI tools into the company’s digital ecosystem.

In September 2023, with Michael Nash as EVP and Chief Digital Officer, Universal Music Group (UMG) partnered with Deezer to launch an “artist-centric” streaming model. The initiative aimed to reward active user engagement and artist-fan relationships by increasing earnings for designated “professional artists” with real fan bases while de-emphasizing “noise audio.”

Under Nash’s digital strategy oversight, Universal Music Group expanded its digital licensing into medical and wellness applications. Following a 2021 partnership with digital therapeutics firm MedRhythms to provide music for prescription neurologic treatments, UMG collaborated with Apple Music in May 2025 to launch "Sound Therapy." The audio wellness collection was developed by Sollos, a music-wellness venture incubated within UMG.

At UMG, Nash expanded the company's commercial agreements with digital partners that increased the availability of the UMG catalog on subscription and ad-supported platforms. With a license with Facebook, Instagram and Messenger, UMG became the first music company to license music to a social media company, following up with agreements with Snap and TikTok.

Nash oversaw the company's expansion of music into health, fitness and medical uses through partnerships with Peloton, Equinox, SoulCycle, Liteboxer and VR fitness app Supernatural. MedRhthms and Music Health's Vera app.

== Recognition ==
From 2016 to 2026, Nash has been named on every Billboard’s Power 100 list.
