= Prince Interactive =

1994 multimedia CD-ROM video game

- Developer: Graphix Zone
- Publisher: Compton's New Media
- Platforms: Mac OS, Windows 3.1x
- Release: 1994
- Genres: Graphic adventure, puzzle
- Mode: Single-player

Prince Interactive is a 1994 interactive music CD-ROM developed by Graphix Zone. It was released in 1994, based on the musician Prince and his Paisley Park Studios recording complex.

== Gameplay ==
The disc contains a video game, songs, music videos, a virtual tour through Paisley Park Studios, and other multimedia resources. Complete gameplay can last for hours.

The video game is a graphic adventure with gameplay mechanics similar to Myst, requiring the player to explore the many different rooms in Paisley Park Studios and solve puzzles to collect the five pieces of Prince's symbol. It features six complete songs, including several which were previously unreleased, 52 song clips, four full-length music videos, 31 video clips, and nine morphs. There is an interactive mixing board for adjusting music. The private club contains clips of musicians, including Eric Clapton, Little Richard, George Clinton, and Miles Davis discussing Prince's career.

== Reception ==
Ty Burr of Entertainment Weekly rated it as B+, describing it as "dopey but fun" and "imbued with [Prince's] goofball carnality", but more "marketing than entertainment". The gameplay was described as "meaningless scavenger hunts" and a "pointless" mixing board function. He summarized it as "a blast" to show it to friends but with no replay value. He cynically lamented this example of the entire two-year-old medium of the "craven new world of multimedia ... encrusted with cliches" within the "copycat mentality that rules pop music [with] a stable of aging rock & roll acts with time on their hands and a desperate need to seem relevant again".
