= Apple Box =

Box set by XTC
- Released: 31 October 2005
- Recorded: January–August 1998 (volume one); April–December 1999, Idea Studios, Wiltshire and Chipping Norton Recording Studios, Oxfordshire, United Kingdom (volume two); Home studios of Colin Moulding and Andy Partridge (volumes three and four)
- Genre: Pop rock
- Length: 215:02
- Language: English
- Label: Idea
- Producers: Haydn Bendall and Nick Davis (volume one), Nick Davis (volume two), XTC (volumes three and four)

XTC other chronology
Waspstrumental (2002)	Apple Box (2005)

Professional ratings
Review scores
Source	Rating
Allmusic	3.5/5 stars
Pitchfork Media	(7.8/10)

Apple Box is a box set by XTC compiling Apple Venus Volume 1 and Wasp Star (Apple Venus Volume 2) along with their respective demo albums Homespun and Homegrown. It is the third box set of their career following Transistor Blast: The Best of the BBC Sessions and Coat of Many Cupboards, released by Idea Records.

== Track listing ==
=== UK CD: IDEACD 007 ===
All songs written by Andy Partridge, except where noted.

Apple Venus Volume 1

1. "River of Orchids" – 5:53
2. "I'd Like That" – 3:50
3. "Easter Theatre" – 4:37
4. "Knights in Shining Karma" – 3:39
5. "Frivolous Tonight (Colin Moulding) – 3:09
6. "Greenman" – 6:17
7. "Your Dictionary" – 3:14
8. "Fruit Nut" (Moulding) – 3:01
9. "I Can't Own Her" – 5:26
10. "Harvest Festival" – 4:15
11. "The Last Balloon" – 6:39

Wasp Star (Apple Venus Volume 2)

1. "Playground" – 4:17
2. "Stupidly Happy" – 4:13
3. "In Another Life" (Moulding) – 3:35
4. "My Brown Guitar" – 3:51
5. "Boarded Up" (Moulding) – 3:23
6. "I'm the Man Who Murdered Love" – 3:44
7. "We're All Light" – 4:39
8. "Standing in for Joe" (Moulding) – 3:42
9. "Wounded Horse" – 4:11
10. "You and the Clouds Will Still Be Beautiful" – 4:18
11. "Church of Women" – 5:06
12. "The Wheel and the Maypole" – 5:55

Homespun

1. "River of Orchids" – 4:10
2. "I'd Like That" – 4:47
3. "Easter Theatre" – 4:52
4. "Knights in Shining Karma" – 3:38
5. "Frivolous Tonight (Moulding) – 3:06
6. "Greenman" – 6:01
7. "Your Dictionary" – 3:14
8. "Fruit Nut" (Moulding) – 2:44
9. "I Can't Own Her" – 5:06
10. "Harvest Festival" – 5:17
11. "The Last Balloon" – 5:17

Homegrown

1. "Playground" – 4:25
2. "Stupidly Happy" – 3:45
3. "In Another Life" (Excerpt of original demo) (Colin Moulding) – 2:02
4. "In Another Life" (Jug band version) (Moulding) – 3:44
5. "Some Lovely" – 3:57
6. "Boarded Up" (Moulding) – 2:56
7. "I'm the Man Who Murdered Love" (Early 'other song' cassette idea) – 2:36
8. "I'm the Man Who Murdered Love" (Tamla version excerpt) – 0:39
9. "I'm the Man Who Murdered Love" – 3:33
10. "We're All Light" (Early cassette idea) – 1:14
11. "We're All Light" – 4:32
12. "Standing in for Joe" (Lounge version) (Moulding) – 2:41
13. "Standing in for Joe" (Moulding) – 3:34
14. "Wounded Horse" – 4:22
15. "You and the Clouds Will Still Be Beautiful" – 3:46
16. "Lie for a Lie" (Cassette demo) – 1:43
17. "Church of Women" – 4:36
18. "The Pot Won't Hold Our Love" (Early cassette idea) – 1:38
19. "Everything Decays" (Early cassette idea) – 2:26
20. "The Wheel and the Maypole" – 5:33

Purchase of the box set also provides instructions for downloading two non-album XTC tracks:

1. "Spiral" (Partridge)
2. "Say It" (Moulding)

== Personnel ==
- Peter Ashworth – photography
- Ian Cooper – mastering
- Steve Gullick – photography
- Valerie Phillips – photography
- Andrew Swainson – design

=== Apple Venus Volume 1 ===
XTC

- Dave Gregory – piano, keyboards, keyboard programming, guitars, backing vocals (Gregory left the band during recording)
- Colin Moulding – vocals, bass guitar
- Andy Partridge – vocals, guitars

Additional musicians

- Mike Batt – orchestral arrangements for "Greenman" and "I Can't Own Her"
- Haydn Bendall – keyboards
- Guy Barker – trumpet and flugelhorn solo on "The Last Balloon"
- Nick Davis – keyboards
- Prairie Prince – drums, percussion
- Steve Sidwell – trumpet solo on "Easter Theatre"
- All arrangements played by The London Session Orchestra under their leader Gavin Wright

Production

- Haydn Bendall – original production, engineering
- Nick Davis – additional production, engineering, mix
- Simon Dawson – mix assistance
- Alan Douglas – recording engineer
- Barry Hammond – recording engineer
- Tim Young – mastering

=== Wasp Star (Apple Venus Volume 2) ===
XTC

- Colin Moulding – vocals, bass guitar
- Andy Partridge – vocals, guitar

Additional musicians

- Caroline Dale – cello
- Nick Davis – keyboards
- Simon Gardner – flugelhorn
- Patrick Kiernan – violin
- Peter Lale – viola
- Holly Partridge – backing vocals on "Playground"
- Prairie Prince – drums (2, 3, 4, 12)
- Chuck Sabo – drums (1, 6, 7, 8, 9, 10, 11)
- Kate St. John – oboe
- Matt Vaughn – programming
- Gavin Wright – violin

Production

- Haydn Bendall – recording engineering
- Nick Davis – producer, mixing, recording engineering
- Simon Dawson – mix engineer
- Alan Douglas – recording engineering
- Barry Hammond – recording engineering
- Bob Ludwig – mastering

=== Homespun and Homegrown ===
- Andy Partridge
- Colin Moulding
