= XTC discography =

Discography of English rock band XTC

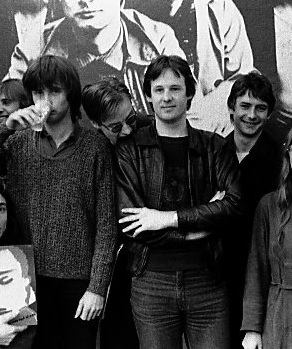
- XTC in 1980
- Studio albums: 14
- Live albums: 2
- Compilation albums: 4
- Tribute albums: 1
- Singles: 40

XTC released 12 original albums and over 30 singles for Virgin Records, between 1977 and 1992. They signed to Cooking Vinyl for their final two albums in 1999 and 2000.

== Albums ==
=== Studio albums ===
| Title | Album details | Peak chart positions | | | | | | | Certifications (sales thresholds) |
| Title | Album details | UK | AUS | CAN | NL | NZ | SWE | US | Certifications (sales thresholds) |
|---|---|---|---|---|---|---|---|---|---|
| White Music | Released: 20 January 1978; Label: Virgin; Formats: LP, MC | 38 | — | — | — | — | — | — | |
| Go 2 | Released: 13 October 1978; Label: Virgin; Formats: LP, MC | 21 | 93 | — | — | — | — | — | |
| Drums and Wires | Released: 17 August 1979; Label: Virgin; Formats: LP, MC, 8-track | 34 | 40 | 15 | — | 12 | — | 174 | CAN: Gold |
| Black Sea | Released: 12 September 1980; Label: Virgin; Formats: LP, MC | 16 | 27 | 79 | — | 1 | — | 41 | BPI: Silver |
| English Settlement | Released: 12 February 1982; Label: Virgin; Formats: 2xLP, LP, 2xMC, MC | 5 | 14 | 15 | 14 | 41 | 23 | 48 | BPI: Silver |
| Mummer | Released: 30 August 1983; Label: Virgin; Formats: LP, MC | 51 | — | 80 | 29 | — | 28 | 145 | |
| The Big Express | Released: 15 October 1984; Label: Virgin; Formats: CD, LP, MC | 38 | 96 | — | — | — | 31 | 181 | |
| Skylarking | Released: 27 October 1986; Label: Virgin; Formats: CD, LP, MC | 90 | — | 93 | — | — | — | 70 | |
| Oranges & Lemons | Released: 27 February 1989; Label: Virgin; Formats: CD, 2xLP, MC | 28 | 91 | 35 | — | — | 31 | 44 | |
| Nonsuch | Released: 27 April 1992; Label: Virgin; Formats: CD, 2xLP, MC | 28 | 75 | 72 | 72 | — | — | 97 | |
| Apple Venus Volume 1 | Released: 17 February 1999; Label: Cooking Vinyl; Formats: CD, LP, MC | 42 | 74 | — | — | — | — | 106 | |
| Wasp Star (Apple Venus Volume 2) | Released: 17 May 2000; Label: Cooking Vinyl; Formats: CD, 2xLP, MC | 40 | — | — | — | — | — | 108 | |
"—" denotes a recording that did not chart or was not released in that territory.

=== Live albums ===
| Title | Album details |
|---|---|
| BBC Radio 1 Live in Concert | Released: 9 November 1992; Label: Windsong International; Formats: CD, MC |

=== Compilation albums ===
| Title | Album details | Peak chart positions | | | Certifications (sales thresholds) |
| Title | Album details | UK | AUS | CAN | Certifications (sales thresholds) |
|---|---|---|---|---|---|
| Eighties Goldies | Released: 1980; Label: Virgin; Formats: MC; France-only limited release | — | — | — | |
| Waxworks: Some Singles 1977–1982 | Released: 5 November 1982; Label: Virgin, Geffen; Formats: LP, MC | 54 | — | — | |
| Beeswax: Some B-Sides 1977–1982 | Released: 5 November 1982; Label: Virgin; Formats: LP | — | — | — | |
| The Compact XTC | Released: 1985; Label: Virgin; Formats: CD | — | — | — | |
| Explode Together: The Dub Experiments 78-80 | Released: August 1990; Label: Virgin; Formats: CD, MC | — | — | — | |
| Rag and Bone Buffet: Rare Cuts and Leftovers | Released: 24 September 1990; Label: Virgin; Formats: CD, MC | — | — | — | |
| The Tiny Circus of Life | Released: 1992; Label: Virgin; Formats: CD; France-only limited release | — | — | — | |
| Drums and Wireless: BBC Radio Sessions 77–89 | Released: October 1994; Label: Nighttracks; Formats: CD | — | — | — | |
| Fossil Fuel: The XTC Singles 1977–92 | Released: 9 September 1996; Label: Virgin; Formats: 2xCD | 33 | 105 | 64 | BPI: Silver |
| Upsy Daisy Assortment | Released: 17 June 1997; Label: Geffen; Formats: CD | — | — | — | |
| Transistor Blast: The Best of the BBC Sessions | Released: 16 October 1998; Label: Cooking Vinyl; Formats: 4xCD | — | — | — | |
| Coat of Many Cupboards | Released: 25 March 2002; Label: Virgin; Formats: 4xCD | — | — | — | |
| Apple Box | Released: 31 October 2005; Label: Idea; Formats: 4xCD | — | — | — | |
"—" denotes a recording that did not chart or was not released in that territory.

=== Other albums ===
| Title | Album details |
|---|---|
| Take Away / The Lure of Salvage | Released: 29 February 1980; Label: Virgin; Formats: LP |
| Homespun | Released: 5 October 1999; Label: Cooking Vinyl/Idea; Formats: CD, LP |
| Homegrown | Released: 21 May 2001; Label: Idea/TVT; Formats: CD, 2xLP |
| Instruvenus | Released: 17 October 2002; Label: Idea; Formats: CD |
| Waspstrumental | Released: 17 October 2002; Label: Idea; Formats: CD |

== Extended plays ==
| Title | Album details |
|---|---|
| 3D EP | Released: 7 October 1977; Label: Virgin; Formats: 12" |
| Go + | Released: 13 October 1978; Label: Virgin; Formats: 12" |
| Live & More | Released: August 1981; Label: Virgin; Formats: 12"; Japan-only release |
| 5 Senses | Released: September 1981; Label: Virgin; Formats: 12"; Canada-only release |
| Dear God | Released: June 1987; Label: Virgin; Formats: CD |
| Gribouillage | Released: April 1992; Label: Virgin; Formats: CD; France-only limited release |
| Demo Tracks | Released: 17 July 1992; Label: Virgin; Formats: CD; Japan-only release |

== Singles ==
| Title | Year | Peak chart positions | | | | | | | | | | Certifications | Albums |
| Title | Year | UK | AUS | BEL (FL) | CAN | IRE | NL | NZ | US | US Alt | US Main | Certifications | Albums |
|---|---|---|---|---|---|---|---|---|---|---|---|---|---|
| "Science Friction" | 1977 | — | — | — | — | — | — | — | — | — | — | | Non-album single |
| "Statue of Liberty" | 1978 | — | — | — | — | — | — | — | — | — | — | | White Music |
| "This Is Pop" | 1978 | — | — | — | — | — | — | — | — | — | — | | White Music |
| "Are You Receiving Me?" | 1978 | — | — | — | — | — | — | — | — | — | — | | Non-album single |
| "Life Begins at the Hop" | 1979 | 54 | 94 | — | 80 | — | — | — | — | — | — | | Non-album single |
| "Making Plans for Nigel" | 1979 | 17 | 94 | — | 12 | — | 32 | 29 | — | — | — | BPI: Silver | Drums and Wires |
| "Ten Feet Tall" (US-only release) | 1980 | — | — | — | — | — | — | — | — | — | — | | Non-album single |
| "Wait Till Your Boat Goes Down" | 1980 | — | — | — | — | — | — | — | — | — | — | | Non-album single |
| "Generals and Majors" | 1980 | 32 | 24 | — | 92 | — | — | 16 | 104 | — | 28 | | Black Sea |
| "Towers of London" | 1980 | 31 | — | — | — | — | — | — | — | — | — | | Black Sea |
| "Take This Town" (split release with The Ruts) | 1980 | — | — | — | — | — | — | — | — | — | — | | Times Square (soundtrack) |
| "Sgt. Rock (Is Going to Help Me)" | 1981 | 16 | — | — | — | 20 | — | — | — | — | — | | Black Sea |
| "Love at First Sight" (Canada-only release) | 1981 | — | — | — | — | — | — | — | — | — | — | | Black Sea |
| "Respectable Street" | 1981 | — | — | — | — | — | — | — | — | — | — | | Black Sea |
| "Senses Working Overtime" | 1982 | 10 | 12 | 31 | 36 | 15 | 22 | 37 | — | — | 38 | | English Settlement |
| "Ball and Chain" | 1982 | 58 | 97 | — | — | — | — | — | — | — | — | | English Settlement |
| "No Thugs in Our House" | 1982 | — | — | — | — | — | — | — | — | — | — | | English Settlement |
| "Great Fire" | 1983 | 101 | — | — | — | — | — | — | — | — | — | | Mummer |
| "Wonderland" | 1983 | 104 | — | — | — | — | — | — | — | — | — | | Mummer |
| "Love on a Farmboy's Wages" | 1983 | 50 | — | — | — | — | — | — | — | — | — | | Mummer |
| "Thanks for Christmas" (as the Three Wise Men) | 1983 | 126 | — | — | — | — | — | — | — | — | — | | Non-album single |
| "All You Pretty Girls" | 1984 | 55 | 76 | — | — | — | — | — | — | — | — | | The Big Express |
| "This World Over" | 1984 | 99 | — | — | — | — | — | — | — | — | — | | The Big Express |
| "Wake Up" | 1985 | 94 | — | — | — | — | — | — | — | — | — | | The Big Express |
| "Grass" | 1986 | 100 | — | — | — | — | — | — | — | — | — | | Skylarking |
| "The Meeting Place (song)" | 1987 | 100 | — | — | — | — | — | — | — | — | — | | Skylarking |
| "Earn Enough for Us" (Australia and Canada-only release) | 1987 | — | — | — | — | — | — | — | — | — | — | | Skylarking |
| "Dear God" | 1987 | 99 | — | — | — | — | — | — | — | — | 37 | | Skylarking |
| "Mayor of Simpleton" | 1989 | 46 | 89 | — | 42 | — | — | — | 72 | 1 | 15 | | Oranges & Lemons |
| "King for a Day" | 1989 | 82 | — | — | — | — | — | — | — | 11 | 38 | | Oranges & Lemons |
| "The Loving" | 1989 | — | — | — | — | — | — | — | — | — | — | | Oranges & Lemons |
| "The Disappointed" | 1992 | 33 | 32 | — | — | — | 68 | — | — | — | — | | Nonsuch |
| "The Ballad of Peter Pumpkinhead" | 1992 | 71 | 132 | — | 48 | — | — | — | — | 1 | 46 | | Nonsuch |
| "Dear Madam Barnum" (airplay) | 1992 | — | — | — | — | — | — | — | — | 18 | — | | Nonsuch |
| "Wrapped in Grey" (withdrawn) | 1992 | — | — | — | — | — | — | — | — | — | — | | Nonsuch |
| "Easter Theatre" | 1999 | — | — | — | — | — | — | — | — | — | — | | Apple Venus |
| "I'd Like That" | 1999 | 96 | — | — | — | — | — | — | — | — | — | | Apple Venus |
| "I'm the Man Who Murdered Love" | 2000 | 144 | — | — | — | — | — | — | — | — | — | | Wasp Star |
| "Where Did the Ordinary People Go?" | 2005 | — | — | — | — | — | — | — | — | — | — | | Non-album single |
"—" denotes releases that did not chart or were not released in that territory.

== Music videos ==
| Year | Title | Director |
|---|---|---|
| 1977 | "Science Friction" | Unknown |
| 1978 | "Dance Band" | Keith McMillan |
| 1978 | "Hang on to the Night" | Keith McMillan |
| 1978 | "She's So Square" | Keith McMillan |
| 1978 | "Statue of Liberty" | Keith McMillan |
| 1978 | "This Is Pop?" | Unknown |
| 1978 | "Heatwave" | Unknown |
| 1978 | "Are You Receiving Me?" | Unknown |
| 1978 | "I Am The Audience" | Unknown |
| 1979 | "Life Begins at the Hop" | Unknown |
| 1979 | "Making Plans for Nigel" | Russell Mulcahy |
| 1980 | "Generals and Majors" | Unknown |
| 1980 | "Towers of London" | Brian Grant |
| 1981 | "Respectable Street" | Unknown |
| 1982 | "All of a Sudden (It's Too Late)" | Unknown |
| 1982 | "Senses Working Overtime" | Brian Grant |
| 1982 | "Ball and Chain" | Brian Grant |
| 1982 | "Beating Of Hearts" | Unknown |
| 1983 | "Wonderland" | Peter Sinclair |
| 1983 | "Love on a Farmboy's Wages" | Unknown |
| 1983 | "Funk Pop A Roll" | Unknown |
| 1984 | "All You Pretty Girls" | Roger H. Lyons |
| 1986 | "Grass" | Nick Brandt |
| 1987 | "The Meeting Place" | Unknown |
| 1987 | "The Man Who Sailed Around His Soul" | Unknown |
| 1987 | "Dear God" | Nick Brandt |
| 1989 | "Mayor of Simpleton" | Ian Absentia |
| 1989 | "King for a Day" | Tony Kaye |
| 1992 | "The Disappointed" | Unknown |
| 1992 | "The Ballad of Peter Pumpkinhead" | Unknown |
| 1992 | "Wrapped in Grey" | Unknown |

== See also ==
- The Dukes of Stratosphear
- A Testimonial Dinner: The Songs of XTC
- Left of the Dial: Dispatches from the '80s Underground
- The Official Fuzzy Warbles Collector's Album — a boxed set of eight albums of demos by Andy Partridge, many of which became XTC songs.
