= Homespun =

Home spun literally refers to hand spinning, see spinning (textiles).

Homespun may refer to:

- Homespun fabric, especially that worn by American colonists who were boycotting British goods
- "Homespun", pseudonym of Benjamin Franklin in The Hasty-Pudding etc.
- Prudentia Homespun pseudonym of Jane West, English novelist, poet, playwright
- Homespun (Winchester, Virginia) also known as the Bell House, is a historic home located near Winchester, Frederick County, Virginia.
- Homespun, 1913 short silent film with Richard Travers

== Music ==
- Homespun Records, original record company of Rick Cassidy started in 1967
- Homespun (band), English pop/folk band formed in 2003 by Dave Rotheray
- Homespun (XTC album), demo tape by XTC, same track list as Apple Venus Volume 1
- Homespun (Homespun album) 2003 debut album by Homespun
- Homespun Music Instruction, started by Happy Traum in 1967

== See also ==
- A Homespun Vamp, a 1922 American drama silent film directed by Frank O'Connor starring May McAvoy
