= Waspstrumental =

Studio album by XTC
- Released: 2002
- Recorded: April–December 1999, Idea Studios, Wiltshire and Chipping Norton Recording Studios, Oxfordshire, United Kingdom
- Genre: Pop rock
- Length: 51:12
- Language: Instrumental
- Label: Idea
- Producer: Nick Davis

XTC other chronology
Instruvenus (2002)	Waspstrumental (2002)	Apple Box (2005)

Waspstrumental is a 2002 instrumental version of XTC's Wasp Star (Apple Venus Volume 2) album released in 2000 by Idea Records.

== Track listing ==
=== UK CD: IDEACD 006 ===
All songs written by Andy Partridge, except where noted.

1. "Playground" – 4:19
2. "Stupidly Happy" – 4:15
3. "In Another Life" (Colin Moulding) – 3:35
4. "My Brown Guitar" – 3:52
5. "Boarded Up" (Moulding) – 3:23
6. "I'm the Man Who Murdered Love" – 3:48
7. "We're All Light" – 4:43
8. "Standing in for Joe" (Moulding) – 3:40
9. "Wounded Horse" – 4:12
10. "You and the Clouds Will Still Be Beautiful" – 4:18
11. "Church of Women" – 5:01
12. "The Wheel and the Maypole" – 6:06

== Personnel ==
XTC

- Colin Moulding – bass guitar
- Andy Partridge – guitar

Additional musicians

- Caroline Dale – cello
- Nick Davis – keyboards
- Simon Gardner – flugelhorn
- Patrick Kiernan – violin
- Peter Lale – viola
- Prairie Prince – drums (2, 3, 4, 12)
- Chuck Sabo – drums (1, 6, 7, 8, 9, 10, 11)
- Kate St. John – oboe
- Matt Vaughn – programming
- Gavin Wright – violin

Production

- Haydn Bendall – recording engineering
- Nick Davis – producer, mixing, recording engineering
- Simon Dawson – mix engineer
- Alan Douglas – recording engineering
- Barry Hammond – recording engineering
- Ian Cooper at Metropolis – mastering
