= Commercial Album =

Studio album by the Residents
- Released: October 1980
- Recorded: September 1979 – October 1980
- Genre: Experimental rock
- Length: 43:18
- Label: Ralph
- Producer: The Residents

The Residents chronology
Eskimo (1979)	Commercial Album (1980)	Mark of the Mole (1981)

Professional ratings
Review scores
Source	Rating
AllMusic	4/5 stars
Pitchfork	7.0/10

Commercial Album is the seventh album released by the American experimental rock band the Residents in October 1980 by Ralph Records.

== Background ==
The album is commonly considered a follow-up to their 1978 album Duck Stab/Buster & Glen, in that it retains the former's pop-oriented song structures. It contains 40 songs, each lasting exactly one minute – a deliberate satire of Top 40 mainstream radio. The album's liner notes state that, to form a complete pop song, tracks from the album should be played three times in a row.

The album features a number of guest musicians, notably drummer Chris Cutler and guitarist Fred Frith of the recently disbanded Henry Cow. The credits mention Frith as an "Extra-Hard Working Guest Musician." Frith told author Cole Gagne that he recorded parts for around 25 tracks and was later told by a band member that he appeared on at least 15 of the released cuts, but that he could only identify himself on three tracks on which he played bass. Other guests are credited under pseudonyms, such as Andy Partridge of XTC (as "Sandy Sandwich") and Lene Lovich (as "Mud's Sis"); Brian Eno and David Byrne appear on the album uncredited.

As a promotional stunt, the Residents purchased 40 one-minute advertising slots on San Francisco's most popular Top 40 radio station at the time, KFRC, such that the station played each track on the album over the course of three days. This prompted an editorial in Billboard magazine questioning whether the act was art or advertising.

== Track listing ==
All tracks last exactly one minute, but with a three-second pause between songs making each last around 1:03. On the original LP, "Die in Terror" is incorrectly printed as track 14, between "The Nameless Souls" and "Love Leaks Out".

All tracks are written by the Residents.

Side one
No.	Title	Length
1.	"Easter Woman"	1:03
2.	"Perfect Love"	1:03
3.	"Picnic Boy"	1:03
4.	"End of Home"	1:03
5.	"Amber"	1:03
6.	"Japanese Watercolor"	1:03
7.	"Secrets"	1:03
8.	"Die in Terror"	1:03
9.	"Red Rider"	1:03
10.	"My Second Wife"	1:03
11.	"Floyd"	1:03
12.	"Suburban Bathers"	1:03
13.	"Dimples and Toes"	1:03
14.	"The Nameless Souls"	1:03
15.	"Love Leaks Out"	1:03
16.	"Act of Being Polite"	1:03
17.	"Medicine Man"	1:03
18.	"Tragic Bells"	1:03
19.	"Loss of Innocence"	1:03
20.	"The Simple Song"	1:03
Total length:		21:39

Side two
No.	Title	Length
21.	"Ups and Downs"	1:03
22.	"Possessions"	1:03
23.	"Give It to Someone Else"	1:03
24.	"Phantom"	1:03
25.	"Less Not More"	1:03
26.	"My Work Is So Behind"	1:03
27.	"Birds in the Trees"	1:03
28.	"Handful of Desire"	1:03
29.	"Moisture"	1:03
30.	"Love Is..."	1:03
31.	"Troubled Man"	1:03
32.	"La La"	1:03
33.	"Loneliness"	1:03
34.	"Nice Old Man"	1:03
35.	"The Talk of Creatures"	1:03
36.	"Fingertips"	1:03
37.	"In Between Dreams"	1:03
38.	"Margaret Freeman"	1:03
39.	"The Coming of the Crow"	1:03
40.	"When We Were Young"	1:03
Total length:		21:39

=== 1988 CD bonus tracks ===
No.	Title	Writer(s)	Length
41.	"Shut Up, Shut Up"		1:00
42.	"And I was Alone"		1:00
43.	"Theme for an American TV Show"		1:27
44.	"We're a Happy Family / Bali Ha'i"	The Ramones	1:11
45.	"The Sleeper"		2:58
46.	"Boy in Love"		2:56
47.	"Diskomo"		4:34
48.	"Jailhouse Rock"	Jerry Leiber and Mike Stoller	3:08
49.	"This is a Man's Man's Man's World"	James Brown, Betty Jean Newsome	3:44
50.	"Hit the Road Jack"	Percy Mayfield	4:03
Total length:			1:08:01

- Tracks 41 and 42 are outtakes from the album, released separately as the Commercial Single.
- Track 44 was recorded for the 1980 Morgan Fisher project Miniatures.
- Tracks 45–48 were previously released on the 1983 compilation Residue.
- Track 49 was previously released as a single in 1984.
- Track 50 was previously released as a single in 1987.

=== 2019 pREServed edition bonus tracks ===
Disc one
No.	Title	Writer(s)	Length
41.	"Shut Up, Shut Up"		1:02
42.	"And I Was Alone"		1:04
43.	"Electronic Elaborate Waste"		1:02
44.	"Kraftwerk"		1:03
45.	"Cosmetics for Reality"		1:06
46.	"Rosco's Righteous Rodent"		1:01
47.	"Pretty Baby"		1:04
48.	"Tuxedos"		1:08
49.	"No Longer Unused"		1:03
50.	"Instant Hostility"		3:04
51.	"Elevator Lady"		2:37
52.	"We're a Happy Family"	The Ramones	1:10
Total length:			61:50

After a small bit of silence, an unlisted track plays, a "concentrate" mix of the advertisements that were aired in promotion of the album on KFRC.

Disc two
No.	Title	Length
1.	"Shut Up, Shut Up" (Residue version)	1:12
2.	"And I Was Alone" (alternate)	1:03
3.	"Ups and Downs" (Residue version)	3:07
4.	"Boy in Love"	2:55
5.	"Die in Terror" (1982 rehearsal)	1:28
6.	"Give It to Someone Else" (1982 rehearsal)	0:53
7.	"Love Leaks Out" (1982 rehearsal)	1:09
8.	"The Talk of Creatures" (1982 rehearsal)	1:04
9.	"Easter Woman" (live 1986)	2:30
10.	"Amber" (live 1986)	1:45
11.	"Red Rider" (live 1986)	1:32
12.	"Die in Terror" (live 1986)	1:26
13.	"The Coming of the Crow" (live 1986)	1:45
14.	"Moisture" (Icky Flix)	1:05
15.	"Act of Being Polite" (Icky Flix)	1:03
16.	"Perfect Love" (Icky Flix)	1:06
17.	"The Simple Song" (Icky Flix)	1:04
18.	"Red Rider" (Commercial DVD)	1:09
19.	"Moisture" (Commercial DVD)	1:10
20.	"Commercial Album suite" (live 2005)	5:48
21.	"Give It to Someone Else" (live 2013)	3:04
22.	"Easter Woman" (live 2015)	2:34
23.	"My Second Wife" (live 2015)	2:28
24.	"Loss of Innocence" (live 2015)	2:18
Total length:		44:38

== Personnel ==
- Guest musicians:
  - Fred Frith: guitar on "Japanese Watercolor", "Moisture", and "The Coming of the Crow", bass
- Special Appearances
  - Chris Cutler – drums on "Love Leaks Out", "Moisture", and "The Coming of the Crow"
  - Don Jackovich – drums on "Love Leaks Out"
  - Sandy Sandwich (Andy Partridge) – vocals and guitar on "Margaret Freeman"
  - Mud's Sis (Lene Lovich) – special appearance, vocals on "Picnic Boy"
  - Snakefinger – "special appearance" on "Moisture", vocals on "Ups and Downs"
- Secret Special Appearances
  - Nessie Lessons – vocals on "Amber"
  - Brian Eno – synthesizer on "The Coming of the Crow"
  - David Byrne – backing vocals on "Suburban Bathers"
- Cover design and art direction by Pore Know Graphics
