= Homegrown (XTC album) =

Demo album by XTC
- Released: 22 May 2001
- Recorded: Home studios of Colin Moulding and Andy Partridge
- Genre: Pop rock
- Length: 63:42
- Language: English
- Label: Idea, TVT
- Producer: XTC

XTC other chronology
Homespun (1999)	Homegrown (2001)	Coat of Many Cupboards (2002)

Professional ratings
Review scores
Source	Rating
Allmusic	link
Q	link

Homegrown is a demo album by XTC, released a year after its parent album Wasp Star (Apple Venus Volume 2) on Idea Records and TVT Records. It was reissued in 2005 as part of the Apple Box.

== Reception ==
Allmusic's Stephen Thomas Erlewine explains "Homegrown, the demo companion to Wasp Star, takes great lengths to show how the songs were written. Several songs are presented in "early cassette ideas," sometimes followed by a finished demo (the most fascinating of these are for "The Man Who Murdered Love," which went through two separate incarnations, including a bizarre Tamla/"Motown" version, before arriving at the finished product -- and that demo is looser, slightly different than the one on the finished album)." He goes on to state "there are a lot of little things that are different, not just in the stated early and alternate versions, but in the final demos, that make this utterly fascinating for the devoted" and "Andy Partridge's brilliant, self-deprecating, funny, revelatory liner notes that help make this already-worthwhile package essential for the collectors who would have bought this album in bootleg form."

Q's Ian Cranna states "This beautifully packaged set of tidied-up home demos is a fascinating glimpse into the creative process, offering lyrical variations, entertaining snatches of abandoned ideas and experiments, plus that certain vitality which can be difficult to recapture in a studio. Each song is also annotated with disarming wit and self-deprecating humour".

Dan Aquilante in The New York Post states "which collects the demos and rough musical sketches that were to become XTC's acclaimed 2000 album "Wasp Star (Apple Venus Vol. 2)." Perfection isn't the center of this disc. Instead it allows the listener in on the steps and even missteps of the "Wasp Star" journey. That concept of development is best illustrated on the song "I'm the Man Who Murdered Love" which is laid out three times on this disc, adjusted and refined. While the music is interesting as it evolves, the liner notes feature handwritten lyric notations complete with the mistakes, cross-outs and corrections. And then there's the notes about the songs from Mr. Partridge that give insight into his very being. This is a rare glimpse into the creative process of rock 'n' roll."

The Times' David Sinclair states "Sounding at times like lost fragments of old Beatles songs and at others like a fully completed Keith Richards album, it is a collection that is likely to be of limited interest to even the most hardcore XTC completist."

== Track listing ==
=== CD: IDEACD 004 ===
All songs written by Andy Partridge, except where noted.

1. "Playground" – 4:25
2. "Stupidly Happy" – 3:45
3. "In Another Life" (Excerpt of original demo) (Colin Moulding) – 2:02
4. "In Another Life" (Jug band version) (Moulding) – 3:44
5. "Some Lovely" – 3:57
6. "Boarded Up" (Moulding) – 2:56
7. "I'm the Man Who Murdered Love" (Early 'other song' cassette idea) – 2:36
8. "I'm the Man Who Murdered Love" (Tamla version excerpt) – 0:39
9. "I'm the Man Who Murdered Love" – 3:33
10. "We're All Light" (Early cassette idea) – 1:14
11. "We're All Light" – 4:32
12. "Standing in for Joe" (Lounge version) (Moulding) – 2:41
13. "Standing in for Joe" (Moulding) – 3:34
14. "Wounded Horse" – 4:22
15. "You and the Clouds Will Still Be Beautiful" – 3:46
16. "Lie for a Lie" (Cassette demo) – 1:43
17. "Church of Women" – 4:36
18. "The Pot Won't Hold Our Love" (Early cassette idea) – 1:38
19. "Everything Decays" (Early cassette idea) – 2:26
20. "The Wheel and the Maypole" – 5:33

Japanese edition bonus tracks

21. "Bumpercars" – 4:06
22. "Didn't Hurt a Bit" (Moulding) – 2:46

== Personnel ==
XTC

- Andy Partridge
- Colin Moulding
