= Wrapped in Grey =

- Planned single cover

Song by XTC

from the album Nonsuch
- Released: 27 April 1992
- Recorded: 1991
- Studio: The Manor, Oxfordshire, England
- Genre: Chamber pop
- Length: 3:46
- Label: Virgin
- Songwriter: Andy Partridge

"Wrapped in Grey" is a song written by Andy Partridge of XTC, released on their 1992 album Nonsuch. It was to be issued as the third single from the album, but its initial pressings were withdrawn by Virgin Records for an unknown reason. This was a stimulus for the band to go on "strike" against the label for a few years until their contracts were terminated.

== Lyrics and composition ==
Partridge described the song as "ersatz Bacharach". Along with "Rook" (1992) and "Easter Theatre" (1999), he named "Wrapped in Grey" as one of the "perfect songs" of his career, feeling that he had "exorcised a lot of those kind of Lennon-and-McCartney, Bacharach-and-David, Brian Wilson type ghosts out of my system by doing all that." He remembered once hearing the song on the radio and feeling like "the boy from Penhill made good". Although he sings lead vocal, he played none of the instrumentation on the recording.

Music journalist Pete Paphides highlighted the song's "transcendent Beach Boys-style harmonies" and felt it would one day make "a most fitting epitaph". Reviewing Nonsuch, Kronto Reviews' Leo Breebaart considered the song "very chamber-music like". Spectrum Culture's Stacey Pavlick likened the song's chorus to "a sparkling firework" while Kronto Reviews' Leo Breebaart considered it "the best song on the album" and "a truly touching song".

== Withdrawn single ==
Virgin's choice of "Wrapped in Grey" as a single pleased Partridge, who considered it a leap into "the adult market". He planned and storyboarded a silhouette animation music video for the song inspired by the work of Lotte Reiniger. This was cancelled when Virgin aborted the song's single release, despite a number of copies already being pressed, reported to be between 2,000 and 5,000.

Partridge considered the withdrawal "a big nail in the coffin of the relationship with Virgin" and, on the suggestion of Dave Gregory, the group refused to work for Virgin until they left the label in 1998. Partridge later recognised "Wrapped in Grey" as among the songs from Nonsuch that pointed towards the orchestral textures and acoustic backbone of its follow-up Apple Venus Volume 1 (1999).

== Personnel ==
XTC

- Dave Gregory – piano
- Colin Moulding
- Andy Partridge

Additional musicians

- Dave Mattacks – drums
