= The Disappointed =

1992 single by XTC

Single by XTC

from the album Nonsuch
- B-side: "The Smartest Monkeys"
- Released: 23 March 1992
- Length: 3:23
- Label: Virgin
- Songwriter: Andy Partridge
- Producer: Gus Dudgeon

XTC singles chronology
"The Loving" (1989)	"The Disappointed" (1992)	"The Ballad of Peter Pumpkinhead" (1992)

"The Disappointed" (also typeset as "The Diſappointed") is a song written by Andy Partridge of the English rock band XTC and released in March 1992 by Virgin Records as the lead single from their twelfth album, Nonsuch (1992).

According to Partridge: the lyrics are about people who have been turned down romantically and come together to form an organisation "of the disappointed." It was originally inspired by Argentina's Mothers of the Disappeared. The music video was directed by a relative of Ranulph Fiennes. A home demo of the song was later released on Coat of Many Cupboards (2002).

== Reception ==
Colin Larkin says the song, "could just as easily have acted as a personal epitaph." The Rough Guide describes the song as, "soaringly melodic." The single reached No. 33 on the UK Singles Chart, No. 32 on the Australian ARIA Singles Chart, and No. 68 on the Dutch Single Top 100. In 1993, the song was nominated for an Ivor Novello Award.

== Charts ==
Chart (1992)	Peak position
Australia (ARIA)	32
European Hit Radio (Music & Media)	31
Netherlands (Single Top 100)	68
UK Singles (OCC)	33
UK Airplay (Music Week)	25

== Release history ==
Region	Date	Format(s)	Label(s)	Ref.
United Kingdom	23 March 1992	7-inch vinyl; CD; cassette	Virgin	
United Kingdom	30 March 1992	10-inch vinyl	Virgin	
Japan	1 April 1992	Mini-CD	Virgin	
Australia	22 June 1992	12-inch vinyl; CD; cassette	Virgin	
