= Transistor Blast: The Best of the BBC Sessions =

Box set by XTC
- Released: 24 November 1998
- Recorded: 1977–1989
- Genre: Pop rock
- Length: 194:19 (4 CD Total)
- Label: Cooking Vinyl

XTC other chronology
Upsy Daisy Assortment (1997)	Transistor Blast: The Best of the BBC Sessions (1998)	Homespun (1999)

Professional ratings
Review scores
Source	Rating
AllMusic	link
Fretplay	link
Music Box	link
Q	link

Transistor Blast: The Best of the BBC Sessions is a 4-disc boxed set by the English rock band XTC, released by Cooking Vinyl in November 1998, just three months prior to the studio album Apple Venus Volume 1.

Tracks on the first two discs are culled from various BBC radio sessions the group performed on over the years, notably for John Peel and David Jensen. Discs three and four are live recordings, the latter of which was previously released as BBC Radio 1 Live in Concert and is now titled Live in Concert 1980 on streaming services such as Spotify and Apple Music.

"Opening Speech" from the first disc is Andy Partridge imitating John Peel.

== Track listing ==
=== UK CD: COOKCD152 ===
All songs written by Andy Partridge, except where noted.

=== Disc one ===
Studio sessions

1. "Opening Speech" – 0:49 [John Peel Show: Recorded 8 October 1979; Aired 15 October 1979]
2. "Life Begins at the Hop" (Colin Moulding) – 4:19 [David "Kid" Jensen Show: Recorded 21 May 1979; Aired 31 May 1979]
3. "Scarecrow People" – 4:13 [Richard Skinner Show: Recorded 16 March 1989; Aired 5 April 1989]
4. "Seagulls Screaming Kiss Her, Kiss Her" – 4:21 [Bruno Brookes Show: Recorded 11 October 1984; Aired 20 November 1984]
5. "Ten Feet Tall" (Moulding) – 2:53 [John Peel Show: Recorded 8 October 1979; Aired 15 October 1979]
6. "Garden of Earthly Delights" – 5:33 [Andy Kershaw Show: Recorded 16 March 1989; Aired 11 June 1989]
7. "Runaways" (Moulding) – 4:41 [David "Kid" Jensen Show: Recorded 14 January 1982; Aired 25 January 1982]
8. "When You're Near Me I Have Difficulty" – 3:07 [David "Kid" Jensen Show: Recorded 21 May 1979; Aired 31 May 1979]
9. "I'm Bugged" – 3:34 [John Peel Show: Recorded 21 September 1977; Aired 26 September 1977]
10. "Another Satellite" – 4:21 [Sunday Live Show: Recorded and aired 22 February 1987]
11. "You're the Wish (You Are) I Had" – 3:24 [Bruno Brookes Show: Recorded 11 October 1984; Aired 20 November 1984]
12. "Crosswires" (Moulding) – 2:10 [John Peel Show: Recorded 20 June 1977; Aired 24 June 1977]
13. "Roads Girdle the Globe" – 5:03 [John Peel Show: Recorded 8 October 1979; Aired 15 October 1979]

=== Disc two ===
Studio sessions

1. "No Thugs in Our House" – 5:23 [David "Kid" Jensen Show: Recorded 14 January 1982; Aired 25 January 1982]
2. "One of the Millions" (Moulding) – 4:26 [Andy Kershaw Show: Recorded 16 March 1989; Aired 11 June 1989]
3. "Real by Reel" – 3:48 [John Peel Show: Recorded 8 October 1979; Aired 15 October 1979]
4. "The Meeting Place" (Moulding) – 3:08 [Sunday Live Show: Recorded and aired 22 February 1987]
5. "Meccanic Dancing (Oh We Go!)" – 2:36 [John Peel Show: Recorded 13 November 1978; Aired 23 November 1978]
6. "Poor Skeleton Steps Out" – 3:27 [Richard Skinner Show: Recorded 16 March 1989; Aired 5 April 1989]
7. "Into the Atom Age" – 2:27 [John Peel Show: Recorded 21 September 1977; Aired 26 September 1977]
8. "The Rhythm" (Moulding) – 2:55 [John Peel Show: Recorded 13 November 1978; Aired 23 November 1978]
9. "This World Over" – 4:33 [Bruno Brookes Show: Recorded 11 October 1984; Aired 20 November 1984 - actually the 7" version misfiled]
10. "Snowman" – 4:42 [David "Kid" Jensen Show: Recorded 14 January 1982; Aired 25 January 1982]
11. "Danceband" (Moulding) – 2:40 [John Peel Show: Recorded 21 September 1977; Aired 26 September 1977]
12. "Making Plans for Nigel" (Moulding) – 4:06 [David "Kid" Jensen Show: Recorded 21 May 1979; Aired 31 May 1979]
13. "Jason and the Argonauts" – 5:42 [David "Kid" Jensen Show: Recorded 14 January 1982; Aired 25 January 1982]

=== Disc three ===
1978/79 – Live in Concert recordings

1. "Radios in Motion" – 3:21
2. "Crosswires" (Moulding) – 2:06
3. "Science Friction" – 3:34
4. "Statue of Liberty" – 2:58
5. "The Rhythm" (Moulding) – 2:55
6. "I'll Set Myself on Fire" (Moulding) – 3:27
7. "New Town Animal in a Furnished Cage" – 1:55
8. "All Along the Watchtower" (Bob Dylan) – 5:58
9. "Beatown" – 3:24
10. "This Is Pop?" – 2:37
11. "Dance Band" (Moulding) – 2:49
12. "Neon Shuffle" – 4:32
- All tracks recorded for Sight & Sound in Concert at The Hippodrome, Golders Green, London, 9 March 1978, except tracks 3, 5 and 9, recorded for Live in Concert at Paris Theatre, London, 17 January 1979.

=== Disc four ===
Live in Concert, Hammersmith Palais, 22 December 1980

1. "Life Begins at the Hop" (Moulding) – 3:55
2. "Burning with Optimism's Flames" – 4:29
3. "Love at First Sight" (Moulding) – 3:03
4. "Respectable Street" – 3:52
5. "No Language in Our Lungs" – 4:58
6. "This is Pop" – 2:49
7. "Scissor Man" – 4:58
8. "Towers of London" – 5:13
9. "Battery Brides" – 7:20
10. "Living Through Another Cuba" – 3:29
11. "Generals and Majors" (Moulding) – 4:37
12. "Making Plans for Nigel" (Moulding) – 4:21
13. "Are You Receiving Me?" – 3:16

== Personnel ==
Credits adapted from the liner notes of Transistor Blast (technical personnel) and Drums and Wireless: BBC Radio Sessions 77–89 (XTC).

XTC

- Andy Partridge – vocals, guitar, keyboards, zippy zither, drum programming
- Colin Moulding – vocals, bass
- Barry Andrews – piano, organ, vocals (discs 1, 2: 1977–1978; disc 3: 1978–1979)
- Terry Chambers – drums (discs 1–4: 1977–1982)
- Dave Gregory – guitar, keyboards, drum programming, vocals (discs 1, 2, 4: 1979–1989)

Technical

- Tony Wilson – producer (disc 1: 1, 5, 13 / disc 2: 3, 5, 8)
- Bill Aitken – producer (disc 1: 2, 8 / disc 2: 12)
- Nick Gomm – producer (disc 1: 2, 8 / disc 2: 12)
- Pete Watts – producer (disc 1: 3, 6 / disc 2: 2, 6)
- Ted De Bono – producer (disc 1: 4, 11 / disc 2: 9), engineer (disc 1: 3, 6 / disc 2: 2, 6)
- John Sparrow – producer (disc 1: 7 / disc 2: 1, 10, 13)
- Malcolm Brown – producer (disc 1: 9, 12 / disc 2: 7, 11)
- Phil Ross – producer (disc 1: 10 / disc 2: 4)
- Jeff Griffin – producer (disc 3: 1, 2, 4, 6–8, 10–12 / disc 4 (Note: On BBC Radio 1 Live in Concert, released in 1992, Pete Dauncey is credited as producer and Paul Nixon as engineer.)
- Chris Lycett – producer (disc 3: 3, 5, 9)
- Dave Dade – engineer (disc 1: 1, 5, 9, 12, 13 / disc 2: 3, 5, 7, 8, 11)
- Tim Durham – engineer (disc 1: 3, 6 / disc 2: 2, 6)
- Mike Robinson – engineer (disc 1: 7 / disc 2: 1, 10, 13)
- Ian Cooper – mastering
- Andy Partridge – artwork, liner notes (disc 3 and 4)
- Andrew Swainson – artwork
- Colin Moulding – liner notes (disc 1 and 2)
