= Eskimo (album) =

Studio album by the Residents
- Released: 1979
- Recorded: April 1976 – May 1979
- Genres: Avant-garde; ambient; post-punk
- Length: 39:01
- Label: Ralph
- Producer: The Residents

The Residents chronology
Duck Stab (1978)	Eskimo (1979)	Commercial Album (1980)

Eskimo is the sixth studio album by the American experimental rock band the Residents, released in 1979 through Ralph Records. The album was originally supposed to follow 1977's Fingerprince, but due to many delays and arguments with management, it was not released until 1979.

The pieces on Eskimo feature home-made instruments and chanting against backdrops of wind-like synthesizer noise and miscellaneous sound effects. The work is programmatic, each piece pairing music with text detailing a corresponding pseudo-ethnographic narrative. While Eskimo is officially maintained to be a true historical document of life in the Arctic, the stories are deliberately absurd fictions loosely based on actual Inuit culture, and the chanting is a combination of gibberish and commercial slogans. The album satirizes ignorance toward and mistreatment of the indigenous peoples of the Americas.

== Diskomo ==
A companion piece, Diskomo, was released in 1980 as a 12-inch single, featuring a remix of the songs backed by a disco beat. In 1988, Diskomo was covered by Belgian new beat group L&O, and retitled "Even Now". Diskomo 2000, a follow-up EP featuring the original remix, its B-side (Goosebump, a collection of children's songs played on toy musical instruments), and several other versions, was released in 2000. The EP's title track, "Diskomo 2000" redoes Diskomo in the style of "Even Now".

== Critical reception ==
Professional ratings
Review scores
Source	Rating
AllMusic	4.5/5 stars
The Encyclopedia of Popular Music	3/5 stars
The Great Rock Discography	8/10
MusicHound Rock	5/5 stars
The Rolling Stone Album Guide	3/5 stars
Spin Alternative Record Guide	9/10
Sputnikmusic	4/5

The Fort Lauderdale Sun-Sentinel wrote that "Eskimo is truly a new branch on the rock and roll family tree, truly original music, a new sound." Spin called it "an album-length threnody for wind machine and invented language".

The Rolling Stone Album Guide deemed Eskimo "a dreary and dank concept album." The Spin Alternative Record Guide called it "creepy and funny" and "the Residents' zenith."

== Track listing ==
All tracks are written by the Residents.

Side one
No.	Title	Length
1.	"The Walrus Hunt"	4:01
2.	"Birth"	4:33
3.	"Arctic Hysteria"	5:57
4.	"The Angry Angakok"	5:20
Total length:		20:47

Side two
No.	Title	Length
5.	"A Spirit Steals a Child"	8:44
6.	"The Festival of Death"	10:20
Total length:		19:56

=== 1987 CD bonus tracks ===
Tracks 7–10 taken from the 1979 album Subterranean Modern. The album also featured the music of San Francisco bands Chrome, MX-80 Sound and Tuxedomoon.

No.	Title	Length
7.	"I Left My Heart in San Francisco"	2:02
8.	"Dumbo the Clown (Who Loved Christmas)"	2:07
9.	"Is He Really Bringing Roses? (The Replacement)"	2:34
10.	"Time's Up"	2:54
Total length:		48:38

=== 2019 pREServed edition bonus tracks ===
Disc one
No.	Title	Length
7.	"Eskimo" (1978 demo)	14:19
8.	"Eskimo acapella suite"	20:52
Total length:		74:12

Disc two
No.	Title	Length
1.	"Kenya"	2:28
2.	"Middle East Dance (from ICE2)"	3:22
3.	"Scottish Rhapsody"	2:55
4.	"Diskomo" (demo)	3:00
5.	"Diskomo"	7:55
6.	"Disaster"	3:51
7.	"Plants"	3:15
8.	"Farmers"	5:26
9.	"Twinkle"	2:01
10.	"Heart in SF"	2:08
11.	"I Left My Heart in San Francisco"	2:02
12.	"Dumbo the Clown (Who Loved Christmas)"	2:09
13.	"Is He Really Bringing Roses? (The Replacement)"	2:36
14.	"Time's Up"	2:56
15.	"The Sleeper"	3:27
16.	"Eskimo suite" (1982 rehearsal)	8:22
17.	"Diskomo" (1982 rehearsal)	2:41
18.	"The Festival of Death" (live 1986)	4:38
19.	"Diskomo" (live in San Francisco, 1987)	3:18
20.	"Eskimo Opera Proposal"	5:27
Total length:		73:57

== Personnel ==
- The Residents – vocals, instruments, effects
- Snakefinger – guitar
- Chris Cutler – percussion
- Don Preston – synthesizers
