= Wasp Star (Apple Venus Volume 2) =

Studio album by XTC
- Released: 23 May 2000
- Recorded: April 1999–January 2000
- Studios: Idea Studios, Wiltshire and Chipping Norton Recording Studios, Oxfordshire, England
- Length: 50:54
- Label: Cooking Vinyl
- Producer: Nick Davis

XTC chronology
Apple Venus Volume 1 (1999)	Wasp Star (Apple Venus Volume 2) (2000)	Homegrown (2001)

Singles from Wasp Star (Apple Venus Volume 2)
- 1. "I'm the Man Who Murdered Love" Released: May 2000

Professional ratings
Aggregate scores
Source	Rating
Metacritic	75/100
Review scores
Source	Rating
AllMusic	3/5 stars
NME	7/10
Pitchfork	8.0/10
PopMatters	9/10
Q	3/5 stars
Robert Christgau	(2-star Honorable Mention)
Rolling Stone	3/5 stars

Wasp Star (Apple Venus Volume 2) is the fourteenth and final studio album by the English rock band XTC, released 23 May 2000 on Cooking Vinyl/Idea Records. Defined by bandmember Andy Partridge as the "eclectric" counterpart to 1999's Apple Venus Volume 1, it consists of rock-based material largely written between 1994 and 1996. Wasp Star reached number 40 on the UK Albums Chart.

In 2001 XTC released Homegrown, a version of Wasp Star consisting of its demos. This was followed in 2002 by an instrumental version of the album entitled Waspstrumental.

XTC dissolved in 2006, leaving Wasp Star their last studio album to date.

== Track listing ==
All tracks are written by Andy Partridge, except where noted.

Wasp Star (Apple Venus Volume 2) track listing
No.	Title	Writer(s)	Length
1.	"Playground"		4:17
2.	"Stupidly Happy"		4:13
3.	"In Another Life"	Colin Moulding	3:35
4.	"My Brown Guitar"		3:51
5.	"Boarded Up"	Moulding	3:23
6.	"I'm the Man Who Murdered Love"		3:44
7.	"We're All Light"		4:39
8.	"Standing in for Joe"	Moulding	3:42
9.	"Wounded Horse"		4:11
10.	"You and the Clouds Will Still be Beautiful"		4:18
11.	"Church of Women"		5:06
12.	"The Wheel and the Maypole"		5:55
Total length:			50:54

== Personnel ==
XTC

- Colin Moulding – vocals, bass guitar, harmonica on "In Another Life", guitar on "Boarded Up"
- Andy Partridge – vocals, guitar

Additional personnel

- Caroline Dale – cello
- Nick Davis – keyboards
- Simon Gardner – flugelhorn
- Patrick Kiernan – violin
- Peter Lale – viola
- Holly Partridge – backing vocals on "Playground"
- Prairie Prince – drums (2–4, 12)
- Chuck Sabo – drums (1, 6–11)
- Kate St. John – oboe
- Matthew Vaughan – programming
- Gavyn Wright – violin

Production

- Haydn Bendall – recording engineering
- Nick Davis – producer, mixing, recording engineering
- Simon Dawson – mix engineer
- Alan Douglas – recording engineering
- Barry Hammond – recording engineering
- Bob Ludwig – mastering

== Charts ==
Chart performance for Wasp Star (Apple Venus Volume 2)
Chart	Peak position
UK Albums Chart	40
US Billboard 200	108
