= Duck Stab/Buster & Glen =

Studio album by the Residents
- Released: November 30, 1978
- Recorded: October 1977 – August 1978
- Genre: Experimental rock
- Length: 33:30
- Labels: Ralph; East Side Digital
- Producer: The Residents

The Residents chronology
Not Available (1978)	Duck Stab/Buster & Glen (1978)	Eskimo (1979)

Buster & Glen cover

Duck Stab!/Buster & Glen is the fifth studio album by the American experimental rock band the Residents, released in November 1978 on Ralph Records.

It is named after the first side of the album, Duck Stab!, a seven-song EP released earlier in 1978; Buster & Glen, the B-side of the album, was intended to follow Duck Stab!. After the first pressing of Duck Stab! quickly sold out, which was an oddity for the band, they decided to re-release it as one side of an album, with the unreleased Buster and Glen as side two. This was also in part due to the poor audio quality of the original Duck Stab! EP. The album was later renamed Duck Stab.

The shorter length of the songs made the album more accessible for fans who had recently heard the band's cover of "Satisfaction", and songs like "Constantinople" and "Hello Skinny" helped cement the band's cult following. Some noted that the Residents were approaching commercial elements with this EP, but they were purposefully avoiding others, such as a traditional chorus/verse structure. This album features guitar by Philip "Snakefinger" Lithman.

== Critical reception ==
Professional ratings
Review scores
Source	Rating
AllMusic	3/5 stars
Christgau's Record Guide	A−
The Encyclopedia of Popular Music	4/5 stars
The Great Rock Discography	7/10
The Independent	4/5 stars
MusicHound Rock	4/5 stars
The Rolling Stone Album Guide	4/5 stars
Spin Alternative Record Guide	8/10

Duck Stab was included in the book 1001 Albums You Must Hear Before You Die. In 2018, Andy Gill of The Independent wrote that "as nursery rhymes, [the songs on Duck Stab] blend the sinister with the simple; and as cartoons, they’re the musical equivalent of Tex Avery, constantly playing with their medium and breaking the frame."

== Track listing ==
All tracks written and composed by the Residents, except "Sinister Exaggerator" by the Residents and Snakefinger.

Side one: Duck Stab
No.	Title	Length
1.	"Constantinople"	2:23
2.	"Sinister Exaggerator"	3:28
3.	"The Booker Tease"	1:04
4.	"Blue Rosebuds"	3:08
5.	"Laughing Song"	2:12
6.	"Bach Is Dead"	1:12
7.	"Elvis and His Boss"	2:29
Total length:		14:56

Side two: Buster & Glen
No.	Title	Length
1.	"Lizard Lady"	1:54
2.	"Semolina"	2:48
3.	"Birthday Boy"	2:41
4.	"Weight-Lifting Lulu"	3:11
5.	"Krafty Cheese"	1:59
6.	"Hello Skinny"	2:41
7.	"The Electrocutioner"	3:20
Total length:		18:34

=== 1987 CD bonus tracks ===
Tracks 15–18 taken from the 1980 EP Diskomo/Goosebump.

No.	Title	Length
15.	"Disaster"	3:48
16.	"Plants"	3:14
17.	"Farmers"	5:27
18.	"Twinkle"	1:58
Total length:		49:04

=== 2018 pREServed edition ===
Disc one
No.	Title	Length
15.	"Guylum Bardot '78"	1:07
16.	"Soulful Sax"	2:20
17.	"Ow Boutthat"	0:50
18.	"When Johnny Comes Marching"	1:37
19.	"Unlisted"	2:00
20.	"Santa Dog '78"	1:52
Total length:		44:16

Disc two
No.	Title	Length
1.	"Bach Is Dead" (1982 rehearsal)	1:21
2.	"Birthday Boy" (1982 rehearsal)	3:42
3.	"Constantinople" (1982 rehearsal)	2:11
4.	"DS / BaG suite" (Tromsø, inconvenienced, 1986)	13:22
5.	"Semolina" (live 1986)	3:56
6.	"Hello Skinny" (Icky Flix version)	3:06
7.	"Constantinople" (Icky Flix version)	2:28
8.	"Lizard Lady / Hello Skinny" (live 2005)	5:10
9.	"Semolina" (live 2011)	3:47
10.	"Lizard Lady" (live 2011)	3:42
11.	"Blue Rosebuds" (live 2014)	3:08
12.	"Weight-Lifting Lulu" (live 2014)	3:30
13.	"Blue Rosebuds RMX"	3:24
14.	"The Booker Tease" (re-imagined)	2:24
15.	"Weight-Lifting Lulu" (re-imagined)	3:17
16.	"Constantinople" (Adobe)	1:55
17.	"Bach Is Dead" (re-imagined)	2:26
18.	"Laughing Song" (re-imagined)	2:23
19.	"The Electrocutioner" (re-imagined)	2:39
20.	"Hello Skinny" (re-imagined)	4:04
Total length:		71:51

== Personnel ==
- The Residents – arranger, producer
- Snakefinger – vocals, electric guitar
- Ruby – vocals on "The Electrocutioner"
- G. Whifler – photography
- Pore No Graphics – cover art

== Covers ==
- "Blue Rosebuds" was covered by Shock Headed Peters on the compilation album Devastate to Liberate in December 1985.
- Primus released a medley of the songs "Hello Skinny" and "Constantinople" on the Caroline Records compilation promotional CD On the Nineties Tip... in 1990, and included it as a bonus track on the 2002 reissue of Frizzle Fry. Shortly afterwards, they covered "Sinister Exaggerator" on their 1992 EP Miscellaneous Debris. In the UK, it was on the CD single "Making Plans for Nigel (Cheesy EP 2)".
- "Bach is Dead" was covered by Idiot Flesh on their 1997 album Fancy.
- "Hello Skinny" and "The Electrocutioner" was covered by Flat Earth Society on their 2000 album Bonk.
- Friendly Rich and the Lollipop People covered "Blue Rosebuds" on their 2010 album The Sacred Prune of Remembrance.
