= Nonsuch (album) =

Studio album by XTC
- Released: 27 April 1992
- Recorded: July – October 1991
- Studios: Chipping Norton (Oxfordshire, England)
- Genres: Pop; jangle rock
- Length: 63:29
- Label: Virgin
- Producer: Gus Dudgeon

XTC chronology
Oranges & Lemons (1989)	Nonsuch (1992)	Apple Venus Volume 1 (1999)

Singles from Nonsuch
- 1. "The Disappointed" Released: March 1992; 2. "The Ballad of Peter Pumpkinhead" Released: June 1992; 3. "Dear Madam Barnum" Released: 1992 (US)

Nonsuch (styled as NONSVCH.) is the twelfth studio album by the English band XTC, released 27 April 1992 on Virgin Records. The follow-up to Oranges & Lemons (1989), Nonsuch is a relatively less immediate and more restrained sounding album, carrying the band's psychedelic influences into new musical styles, and displaying a particular interest in orchestral arrangements. The LP received critical acclaim, charted at number 28 in the UK Albums Chart, and number 97 on the US Billboard 200, as well as topping Rolling Stone's College album chart.

Produced by Gus Dudgeon, 13 of the album's 17 tracks were written by guitarist/leader Andy Partridge, with the rest by bassist Colin Moulding, while Dave Mattacks of Fairport Convention was recruited on drums. Unlike previous XTC albums, Partridge composed many of his songs using a keyboard. Due to the album's lyric content, which covers topics ranging from love and humanity to the Gulf War and P. T. Barnum, Nonsuch has been described as the band's darkest and most political album. The cover depicts an illustration of the former Nonsuch Palace, chosen after the band had settled on the title "nonesuch", which Partridge felt summed up the album's variety of music. It was their third double album when issued on vinyl.

Lead single "The Disappointed" reached number 33 in the UK and was nominated for an Ivor Novello award, while "The Ballad of Peter Pumpkinhead" was the band's second single to top the US Modern Rock Tracks, later becoming a UK top 40 hit when covered by the Canadian band Crash Test Dummies. XTC soon left Virgin Records in the UK following a dispute over the cancelled third single, "Wrapped in Grey". Nonsuch was also nominated for the 1993 Grammy Award for Best Alternative Music Album. In 2013, a remixed and expanded version of the album was released. Mixed by Steven Wilson, the edition included new stereo, surround sound and instrumental mixes of the original album along with various demos and outtakes.

== Background ==
After the band's double album Oranges & Lemons (1989) was released to acclaim from music critics and modest commercial success, XTC took a short break. Band leader Andy Partridge produced And Love For All (1989), the second album by The Lilac Time, while also compering for an unbroadcast children's game show named Matchmakers, and Dave Gregory played for Johnny Hates Jazz, Marc Almond and Francesco Messina whilst also producing for Cud, while Colin Moulding performed a special event concert with David Marx and the Refugees, a Swindon-based band that reunited him with former XTC member Barry Andrews. The band soon reunited and began writing their next, tenth album, the soon-to-become Nonsuch, determined to record their new compositions in their native England, as recording Oranges & Lemons in Los Angeles had made the band absent from their families back in England.

Having written some 32 songs for Nonsuch by 1991, it nonetheless took some time for the album to get off the ground. Initially, the band had issue with the musical director of their label Virgin Records, who, after seeing 32 songs written for Nonsuch, was convinced the band "could do better" and asked them to write other songs. Band leader Andy Partridge reflected: "We were ready [to record the album in 1990], but our English record company refused all our songs." In Partridge's recollection, the director threatened that Virgin would drop the band if the band don't write an album "of twelve Top Ten guaranteed singles," and noted that this attitude held the band up in recording Nonsuch, which they refused to rewrite, believing its songs to be among the greatest they had written. With the band sitting on the material, the director left the label a year later, and his replacement liked the band's content, hurrying the band to record the album.

== Production ==
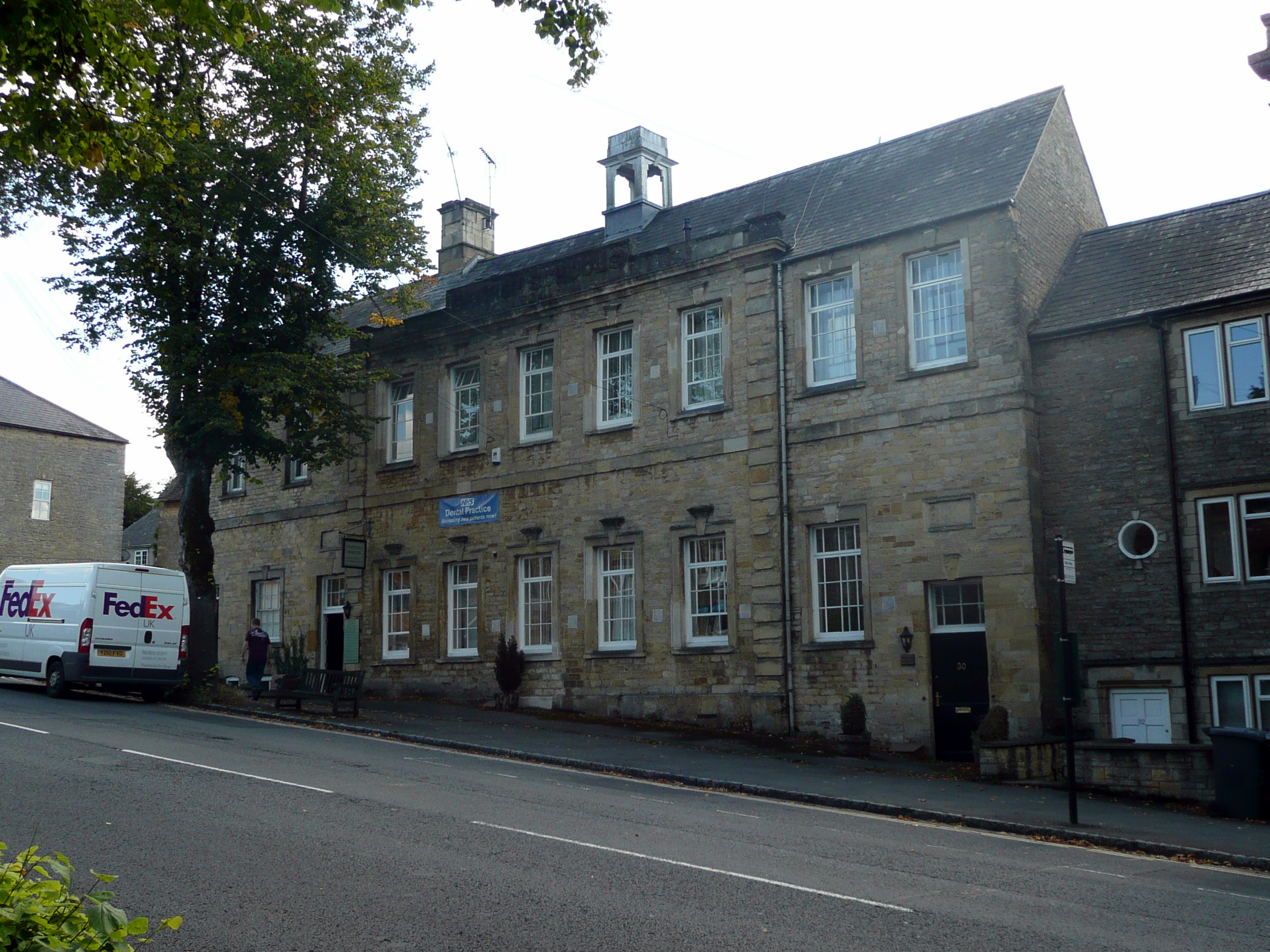
Chipping Norton Recording Studios, where Nonsuch was recorded.

The band's initial choice of producers for the album were not available; they pursued Steve Lillywhite and Hugh Padgham, both of whom the band worked with before, to co-produce the album, but Lillywhite was unavailable due a holiday with his wife Kirsty MacColl and Padgham did not want to produce the album alone, while the band found that hiring John Paul Jones as producer would be too expensive, and a deal to work with Bill Bottrell, who had recently worked on Dangerous (1991) by Michael Jackson, fell through. With Partridge becoming so desperate to record Nonsuch that he "would have done it with the window cleaner," eccentric English producer Gus Dudgeon was the band's final choice, having been enticed by his work with the Bonzo Dog Doo-Dah Band. He produced the album, recorded at Chipping Norton Recording Studios, Oxfordshire, between July and October 1991.

When Dudgeon arrived in the studio and Partridge saw his attire and expensive lifestyle, he felt "he was wrong [for the job], but by that time it was difficult to go back." The band nicknamed him Guff Dungeon "because he was so flatulent." Partridge reflected: "Gus is old school, full of blusters and bluff [mimicking Dudgeon] 'Elton gave me this Rolls-Royce and I said, 'Oh Elton darling...'" Dudgeon had heard of the tense relationship between Partridge and producer Todd Rundgren during the Skylarking sessions, and "had come in armed with a heavy supply for vitriol"; Partridge, meanwhile, started to compare his relationship with Dudgeon to Rundgren, especially after Dudgeon suggested removing one of Partridge's favourite songs on the album, "Rook", though the recording sessions were civil and the two regularly exchanged banter. Dudgeon reportedly kept a tape of him and Partridge joking in the sessions and played it to party guests. Nonetheless, Partridge later commented that "ultimately he wasn't the right producer for us."

At Gregory's suggestion, Dave Mattacks of Fairport Convention played drums on the album. When discussing "what drummer, as a fantasy, [the band] would really like to work with," Mattacks was top of the band's list. The same week, a friend of the band saw him perform live with Fairport Convention and brought XTC back a tour programme, in which Mattacks stated Joni Mitchell and XTC were the artists he would most like to drum for. Partridge, speaking to Bob Harris in a radio interview, commented that he "just had to get on the phone to him straight away." Mattacks agreed to appear on the album because of the band's personality and the quality of the songs, and later reflected that although it was challenging fitting into the band, it was not difficult, elaborating that "the experience was enjoyable. Great songs." Meanwhile, Partridge felt that Dave Gregory improved at arranging musical structures during the sessions. During recording of the album, Moulding and Gregory "found themselves working at a car rental spot to sustain themselves between royalty checks."

The album was mixed at Rockfield Studios, South Wales in November and December 1991. The mixing was due to be done by Dudgeon, who instructed Partridge not to attend, but Partridge insisted he would appear anyway. At the studios, Dudgeon refuted suggestions from Partridge concerning the mix and insisted he mix the album as he desired. This was at odds with engineer Barry Hammond, who had listened to Partridge's suggestions. Both Partridge and Virgin Records were vocal in their dissatisfaction with the first three mixes that Dudgeon had created, with one Virgin executive even comparing one such mix to "ice blasts"; as a result, Dudgeon was subsequently fired, with Nick Davis, who had just finished mixing We Can't Dance by Genesis, being hired to mix the final version of Nonsuch, which he did in a comparatively fast space of two and a half weeks. The album was mastered by Bob Ludwig at Masterdisk, New York.

== Music and lyrics ==
The detailed sound of Nonsuch retains parts of the psychedelic flourishes that defined the band's late 1980s work, except here "integrated into an elaborate, lush pop setting that falls somewhere between Skylarking and Oranges & Lemons," according to critic Stephen Thomas Erlewine of AllMusic. Similarly, David Quantick of Vox found it to continue the jangle rock of the aforesaid albums. Compared to Oranges & Lemons, Partridge described Nonsuch as being less immediate and simpler sounding: "It's not as immediate, and that's the way we want it." Noting the album's eclecticism, music critic Greg Kot considered the album "a mix of Broadway pomp, McCartneyesque sing-song, lilting melodies, delightful odes to everyday pleasures and humbling introspection," while T.J. McGrath of Dirty Linen said Nonsuch "studiously explores jazz-fusion ("That Wave"), folk-rock ("Then She Appeared"), soundtrack muzak ("Bungalow"), cowboy punk ("Crocodile"), psychedelic-power swirl ("Humble Daisy"), and classical sad ballad ("Rook")." Guitar and keyboard textures on the album regularly shift, and strings, horns and piano are included in the album's instrumentation in a fashion that has been compared to the Beach Boys.

Thirteen of the songs are written by Partridge, with the remaining four written by Colin Moulding. In Isler's opinion, Partridge's songs are concerned with themes such as "love, politics and the human comedy," and noting songs which "[blur] these topical boundaries," while the NME noted lyrics about omnibuses, orchards and miscreants. Blogger Roger Friedman of Details noted lyrical content ranging from book burning, the Gulf War and P.T. Barnum and felt the album was a song cycle, while, citing themes of sad retirement in "Bungalow" and maddening alienation in "Rook", Martin Townsend of Vox called the album "precisely of its time," feeling it to reflect "the mental and physical landscape of the [then-current] recession," and felt it was arguably the band's darkest album. It has also been cited as the band's most political album. Unlike previous XTC albums, Partridge composed many of his songs on Nonsuch using the keyboard, an instrument Partridge referred to as "this grinning shark; stroke its teeth and any minute it'll swallow you up." He said he was so unfamiliar with the keyboard that he played it "by drumming on it, two fingers here, two fingers there."

=== Tracks 1–8 ===
"The Ballad of Peter Pumpkinhead" is "relatively rocking" compared to most of the album, and has been called a "shaggy-dog story." It was inspired by a pumpkin that Partridge carved for Halloween, which he decided not to dispose of after the Halloween celebrations, and watched as it decomposed in his back garden. He immortalised it in the song, a ballad concerning a perfect, honest person with a pumpkin for a head and about "how perfect we all could be, and how scared people are of truth." Moulding's first song on the album, "My Bird Performs," is "a metaphor for feeling good about how life's going." He explained: "I hadn't got fond memories of my thirties and naivety got me through my twenties, but as I came closer to my forties it all started to come clear and this, I suppose, was the start of that awakening in me." It took a whole night to loop Mattacks' intricate drum shuffle into the four-minute song.

"Dear Madam Barnum" was written for, but unused by the Australian film The Crossing and is intended to sound like 1965, the year the film was set. Also intended to possess a "circus orchestra feel," Partridge and Mattacks took careful attention in writing the rhythmic feel for the song. The song has a traditional structure, but although Partridge wanted Mattacks to play "a real straight backbeat," he also asked he "put a little skip-and-drag in there that fell somewhere between dotted [time] and straight, because we both agreed that we liked the tension where you get dotted vs. straight, and straight vs. dotted." Mattacks used one of 50 special snare drums he owned for the song, while Gregory incorporates numerous subtle guitar arpeggios and a Hammond organ-based bridge.

Described by band biographer Neville Farmer as "a piece of near-Stratospheric psychedelia," "Humble Daisy" features multiple key changes and what Farmer perceives to be references to the Beach Boys and the Lovin' Spoonful in a musical structure Partridge described as "a piece of dream logic." Written by Moulding, "The Smartest Monkeys" was described by Johan Kugelberg of Spin as "the kind of social commentary that can only be born in a pub," and features jangley guitars. "The Disappointed" concerns itself with people who have been turned down romantically and come together to form an organisation "of the disappointed," while "Holly Up on Poppy" is about Partridge's daughter Holly, Poppy being the name of the rocking horse she had. In writing the song, Partridge hoped to avoid the saccharine nature he felt plagued songs with similar subjects. "Crocodile" deals with jealousy and features what appears to be crocodile noises, but are in fact a sample of a tuned down pig's grunt.

=== Tracks 9–17 ===
Partridge suddenly wrote "Rook", one of his favourite songs on the album, after a period of writer's block: "I was really frightened. I mean, I couldn't even finish the demo because I was in tears. It felt like seeing yourself in a mirror and recognising your own mortality. Maybe it's something in the chord changes." Featuring piano playing, strings and horns, it has been compared to classical music. Though Partridge said he did not understand the lyrics, which he found "exciting," the lyrics concern death and the cycle of life. Vox called it a powerful picture of "alienation verging on madness", while Isler said that, "with impressionistic piano block chords and yearning, dreamy lyric, it is simply an art song."

"Wrapped in Grey"
Partridge based "Wrapped in Grey" on a "three-note pattern" that he "stumbled" on while playing piano, thinking, "Wow, that kind of sounds like Burt Bacharach!". The backing vocals were also Beach Boys-influenced.

"Omnibus", with an offbeat rhythm, is praiseful of women. Partridge wrote: "I love women in every way, shape and form. If that's sexist, then nail me up. I worship at the church of women. The world would be a better place if it were just women and me." Musically, the song was intended as a pastiche on West End musicals. "That Wave" combines Partridge's fear of water and the subject of love "into the sensation of drowning in a wave of love." Moulding described the song's music as a "psychedelic grenade." "Then She Appeared" originated when Partridge wrote it as a Dukes of Stratosphear-style track, intending to release as one of two songs on a seven-inch flexidisc covermount into a music magazine while using a secret pseudonym preporting to be an unknown 1960s band, sharing musical similarities with the other track, "Goodbye Humanosaurus", which the band rehearsed for Nonsuch but ultimately did not use.

Moulding's "War Dance" originated in 1983 for the Mummer sessions in the aftermath of the Falklands War, but Moulding would change the track drastically for its version on Nonsuch, recorded after the Gulf War which gave the song a new poignancy. The song features a synthesized clarinet that Partridge later dismissed as sounding "like a singing penis." "Wrapped in Grey" is about tapping into one's emotions in order to realise life "isn't all grey," while "The Ugly Underneath" concerns itself with politicians. Moulding wrote "Bungalow" and described its musical style as being "[v]ery seaside-y and cheesy organ, like something a cruddy trio in [a] holiday camp might play." It was inspired by his childhood holidays to Weymouth and is a tribute to British seaside holidays, featuring a Welsh male voice choir added by Gregory. Partridge considers the song to be the best song Moulding had written. An anti-censorship song, "Books are Burning" was inspired by the G–E7/G♯ chord change from the Beach Boys' "I Get Around" (1964) while the lyrics were based on Salman Rushdie and the religious controversy surrounding his work.

== Album artwork and title ==
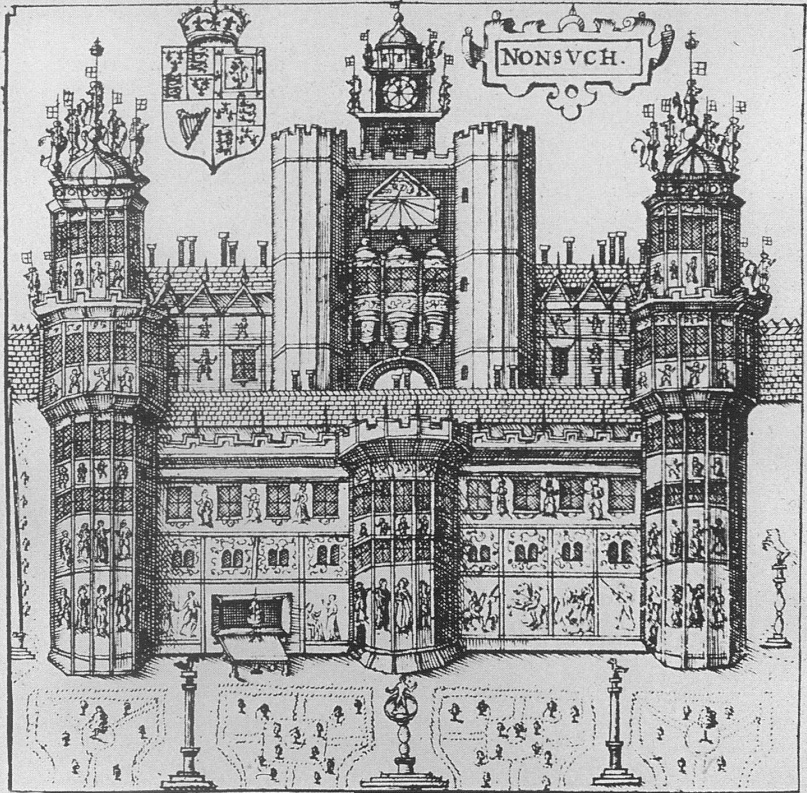
A 17th-century map of Nonsuch Palace illustrated by cartographer John Speed, which served as the basis of the album cover.

Partridge selected the name of the album after encountering a drawing of the former Nonsuch Palace in Surrey and, thinking that the archaic word "Nonsuch" meant "does not exist" rather than, as he later learned, "unique". Other proposed names for the album were Balloon, which Partridge thought was "a lovely, round word" which "evokes associations with related traveling", The Last Balloon Ride Home and Milkfloat. Partridge said of the final title: "It is a very beautiful word, but also one of my favorite record companies, the American record company Nonesuch, which releases this old music I like a lot. I then discovered it was the most marvellous castle ever, covered with gold, sculptures and paints, it looked like a fairy tale's wedding cake. It was built by that tyrant, Henry VIII, who razed a village for it. The edifice quickly disappeared, it exists only on two second-rate drawings." He felt the album title was a good way to sum up the otherwise disparate content of the album and present them as an entirety, explaining to one interviewer how he picked the title:

"Its usually words and phrases [that he uses as album titles] that get stuck in my head like some sort of fish hook that I can't get out, and with a mind to finding some kind of ribbon that would tie up any given bouquet of disparate songs which makes up an album, because they're all totally disparate blooms. You got roses in there, you got nettles, you got common daisies, you got the most exotic orchids, and how the hell do you wrap them all up and present them so that people are going to be able to accept it as a whole thing? So its finding that piece of ribbon and finding that piece of cellophane. What type of ribbon and cellophane you use to wrap all these things up."

The album cover features an illustration of the palace, taken from a 1611 map of Surrey by John Speed. Deborah A. Levinson of The Tech felt that the "certain formal elegance" of the Nonsuch Palace illustration and the typeface used in the packaging—a variation of Caslon, albeit with wobbly, uneven letters intended to appear like handwriting—displays a "gracefulness that nulls the listener, making Nonsuch sound harmless, when in fact it's XTC's most political album." Each song on the album has its own illustration on the back cover. Partridge explained: "[T]hey call them chapbook drawings, they're supposed to educate children, you know, you gave a pic then you have a word underneath it, and the child is supposed to look at the drawing and copy the word and all that sort of stuff."

== Release and promotion ==
Nonsuch was released on 27 April 1992 by Virgin Records in the United Kingdom and by Geffen Records a day later in the United States. In addition to single CD and cassette releases, Nonsuch was released as a double vinyl in the UK but not in the US. It reached number 28 on the UK Albums Chart, becoming their second consecutive and final Top 40 album, although it only stayed on the chart for two weeks. Comparatively, the album spent eleven weeks on the US Billboard 200, where it peaked at number 97. The album also reached number one on the Rolling Stone College album chart, at the time a significant feat, and number 75 in the Australian ARIA Charts. Music critic Nick Reed described its minor commercial success as "business as usual for the band."

The album produced two singles, the first of which, "The Disappointed", reached number 33 on the UK Singles Chart, and became nominated for an Ivor Novello Award in 1993. The second single, "The Ballad of Peter Pumpkinhead", reached number 71 in the UK. "Wrapped in Grey" was intended as the third single in September 1992, but was withdrawn by Virgin immediately as they did not think it would be commercially successful. Ultimately 1,000 CD copies were pressed and it was the band's final single before leaving Virgin. Partridge reflected: "It was the great cot-death single – they pressed it and then changed their minds, such a shame." Promotional videos for all three songs were made, with the "Peter Pumpkinhead" video receiving much airplay on MTV that summer; the band also performed "Books Are Burning" live with Mattacks on The Late Show on BBC Two in April 1992. The album was promoted with music magazine advertisements that featured joke quotes such as "George Bush doesn't get it", "David Duke thinks it contains communist codes" and "William Kennedy Smith just wants to know if it gets chicks hot." Other advertisements featured the tagline: "Still Not on Tour (Cheer up, there is a new album)".

== Critical reception ==
Professional ratings
Review scores
Source	Rating
AllMusic	4.5/5 stars
Chicago Tribune	3.5/4 stars
Encyclopedia of Popular Music	5/5 stars
Entertainment Weekly	B+
NME	7/10
Q	3/5 stars
Record Collector	5/5 stars
Rolling Stone	4/5 stars
The Rolling Stone Album Guide	2/5 stars
Select	4/5

Nonsuch received acclaim from music critics. Greg Kot of the Chicago Tribune felt that "the vast majority of the 17 songs are dazzlers," while Michael Azerrad of Rolling Stone felt that "Nonsuch is what happens when three men who grew up on Sgt. Pepper and Pet Sounds stay true. Too lovely for college radio, too challenging for legions of baby boomers unwilling to progress, XTC has built itself a very gorgeous golden cage." Brent Anderson of Sunday Morning Post said Nonsuch is "a multidimensional feast that shows XTC at its most adept and affecting," while Scott Isler of Musician favourably compared parts of Nonsuch to the Beach Boys' Smiley Smile (1967). Terry Staunton of NME wrote that the record "would be an improvement to anyone's record shelf [...] another extremely good XTC album with the usual fractured guitar melodies coupled with cute and curious lyrics about what a nice place England is. Oddly enough, it's the Americans who buy most of this stuff."

By contrast, Robert Christgau dismissed the album as a "dud" and later remarked that "[since the band's] idea of a class pop arranger was the same as Elton John's, I figured that if they were feuding with their record company their record company was right." Entertainment Weekly's Bill Wyman called the album a "kaleidoscopic, highly intelligent collection of off-kilter pop craft that goes on a bit too long. At its best, however, it’s a witty and engaging White Album-ish collection of fairy tales and funny stories." David Hepworth of Q wrote that "Nonsuch contains 17 dense, melodic, intelligent and occasionally irritating pop songs," while commenting that "[t]he level of XTC's invention is evidenced by the arrangements of the guitars and the layers of backing vocals." However, he criticised the album's "tendency to underscore the lyrical message of tunes like ['War Dance'] which is sometimes tiresome." In 1993, the album was nominated for a Grammy Award for Best Alternative Music Album, but lost to Tom Waits' Bone Machine. Colin Larkin rated the album five stars out of five in The Encyclopedia of Popular Music, and ranked "The Ballad of Peter Pumpkinhead" at number 85 in his list of the 100 best singles ever.

Among retrospective reviews, Oregano Rathbone of Record Collector gave the album a perfect score, calling it "a paragon of peerless songwriting and enchanted, inimitable musicianship." Stephen Thomas Erlewine of AllMusic described Nonsuch "modest, minor masterpiece" and the band's "most immaculate album to date," finding the album's content to be "carefully composed and crafted." David Quantick of Q reflected that the album was "very much malt XTC, a fine blend of all their various styles matured to an extraordinary refinement. So no hits then, but 17 excellent songs." Writing in 2014, Nick Reed of The Quietus wrote that Nonsuch is "refreshingly more restrained than Oranges & Lemons was, and holds up a lot better today." He elaborated: "Listening to it today, it feels like XTC realizing that it may be their last chance, and therefore putting everything they've got into making something timeless." Conversely, The Chicago Reader's J.R. Jones dismissed it as "downright awful, and its album cover, a two-dimensional drawing of a Tudor palace, is an apt illustration for its opaque sound." Stereogum's Robert Ham evaluated the album as the second-worst of the group's discography. He criticised the production's "digital sheen" which he thought was most audible in "poor Dave Mattacks' drums. Each cymbal crash and snare hit appears to be spilling over with ones and zeros."

== Aftermath and alternate versions ==
Partridge was pleased with Nonsuch, joking that "on a scale of 0 to 1, it's nearly 1." According to The Boston Globe writer Jim Sullivan, although Partridge was pleased with the acclaim the album received, he remained modest about its success. In the seven years following the album's release, XTC went on strike against Virgin Records, partly because of the label's refusal to release "Wrapped in Grey" as a single, and would not return with new music until the album Apple Venus Volume 1 (1999). Musician John Grant cited Nonsuch as his favourite XTC album, calling it "lousy with masterpieces." Joe Jackson called Nonsuch perhaps his favourite XTC album and "a treasure trove to be dipped into again and again."

On 11 June 2001, Virgin released a new version of Nonsuch, with remastering by Ian Cooper, as part of their XTC remasters series released without input from the band. The original back cover design, reproduced on the back cover of the new remastered edition, was accidentally printed an inch and a half too far to the right. Moulding said of the remasters: "The whole thing was a shambles. I think the artwork in particular. A lot of it's all wrong, and so badly printed. I think Nonsuch, the whole thing is shifted about an inch-and-a-half one way I think. It's just a complete muck-up. I don't think they really thought too much about it."

New 2.0 stereo and 5.1 surround sound mixes from the original Nonsuch multitracks by Steven Wilson were released by Partridge's label Ape Records on 4 November 2013. It was released as single CD, CD+DVD and CD+Blu-Ray editions, the video disc of the latter two editions including a plethora of bonus material, including a DVD-Audio version of the album, home demos of the songs by Andy Partridge, work tapes of several songs by Colin Moulding and, exclusively to the Blu-Ray edition, a 48-minute "making of" documentary documenting the album's recording and the music videos for "The Disappointed" and "The Ballad of Peter Pumpkinhead". One notable change with the 2013 versions is that the crossfades between several songs were removed, a decision Wilson persuaded Partridge into allowing.

== Track listing ==
=== Original compact disc ===
All tracks are written by Andy Partridge, except where noted.

No.	Title	Length
1.	"The Ballad of Peter Pumpkinhead"	5:02
2.	"My Bird Performs" (Colin Moulding)	3:51
3.	"Dear Madam Barnum"	2:48
4.	"Humble Daisy"	3:36
5.	"The Smartest Monkeys" (Moulding)	4:18
6.	"The Disappointed"	3:23
7.	"Holly Up on Poppy"	3:04
8.	"Crocodile"	3:56
9.	"Rook"	3:47
10.	"Omnibus"	3:20
11.	"That Wave"	3:34
12.	"Then She Appeared"	3:51
13.	"War Dance" (Moulding)	3:22
14.	"Wrapped in Grey"	3:46
15.	"The Ugly Underneath"	3:50
16.	"Bungalow" (Moulding)	2:49
17.	"Books Are Burning"	4:52
Total length:		63:29

=== 2013 CD and Blu-ray extras ===
The following discounts the alternate 2.0 stereo, 5.1 surround sound, and instrumental mixes included in this edition (each of which duplicate the above running order) as well as the bonus videos.

CD bonus track
No.	Title	Writer(s)	Length
18.	"Didn't Hurt a Bit"	Colin Moulding

All tracks are written by Andy Partridge.

Blu-ray disc: Andy's Home Demos
No.	Title	Length
22.	"Always Winter, Never Christmas"
23.	"Books Are Burning"
24.	"Goosey Goosey"
25.	"Wrapped in Grey"
26.	"That Wave"
27.	"Goodbye Humanosaurus"
28.	"Dear Madam Barnum"
29.	"Crocodile"
30.	"Difficult Age"
31.	"The Ugly Underneath"
32.	"Holly Up on Poppy"
33.	"The Ballad of Peter Pumpkinhead"
34.	"Then She Appeared"
35.	"It's Snowing Angels"
36.	"Rook"
37.	"Humble Daisy"
38.	"Rip Van Reuben"
39.	"I'm the Man Who Murdered Love"
40.	"Omnibus"
41.	"The Disappointed (First Reference Recording)"
42.	"The Disappointed (Second Reference Recording)"
43.	"The Disappointed"
44.	"Wonder Annual"

All tracks are written by Colin Moulding.

Blu-ray disc: Colin's Work Tapes
No.	Title	Length
45.	"My Bird Performs"
46.	"Didn't Hurt a Bit"
47.	"The Smartest Monkeys"
48.	"Down a Peg"
49.	"Bungalow"
50.	"War Dance"
51.	"Car Out of Control"
52.	"Where Did the Ordinary People Go?"

== Personnel ==
XTC

- Andy Partridge – vocals, electric guitar, acoustic guitar, harmonica, tambourine, percussion, shaker, synthesizers, bell tree
- Colin Moulding – vocals, bass guitar, acoustic guitar
- Dave Gregory – electric guitar, electric 12-string guitar, acoustic guitar, piano, synthesizers, Hammond organ, backing vocals, church bell

Additional personnel

- Dave Mattacks – drums, tambourine, samples, shaker, percussion
- Gus Dudgeon – "ringmaster," tambourine, percussion, chorus
- Guy Barker – flugelhorns, trumpet
- Florence Lovegrove – viola
- Rose Hull – cello
- Stuart Gordon – violin
- Gina Griffin – violin
- Neville Farmer – chorus

Technical

- Gus Dudgeon – producer
- Barry Hammond – engineer
- Nick Davis – mixing
- Simon Dawson – mixing assistant
- Dave Dragon – sleeve
- Kevin Westenberg – photography

String and brass arrangements by Dave Gregory, except "Rook" and "Omnibus" by Andy Partridge and "War Dance" by Colin Moulding. Strings on "The Disappointed" arranged by Andy Partridge and Dave Gregory.

== Charts ==
Chart performance for Nonsuch
Chart (1992)	Peak position
Australian Albums (ARIA)	75
Dutch Albums (Album Top 100)	72
Swedish Albums (Sverigetopplistan)	39
UK Albums (Official Charts)	28
US Billboard 200	97
