= Homespun (Winchester, Virginia) =

Historic house in Virginia, United States

- U.S. National Register of Historic Places
- Virginia Landmarks Register
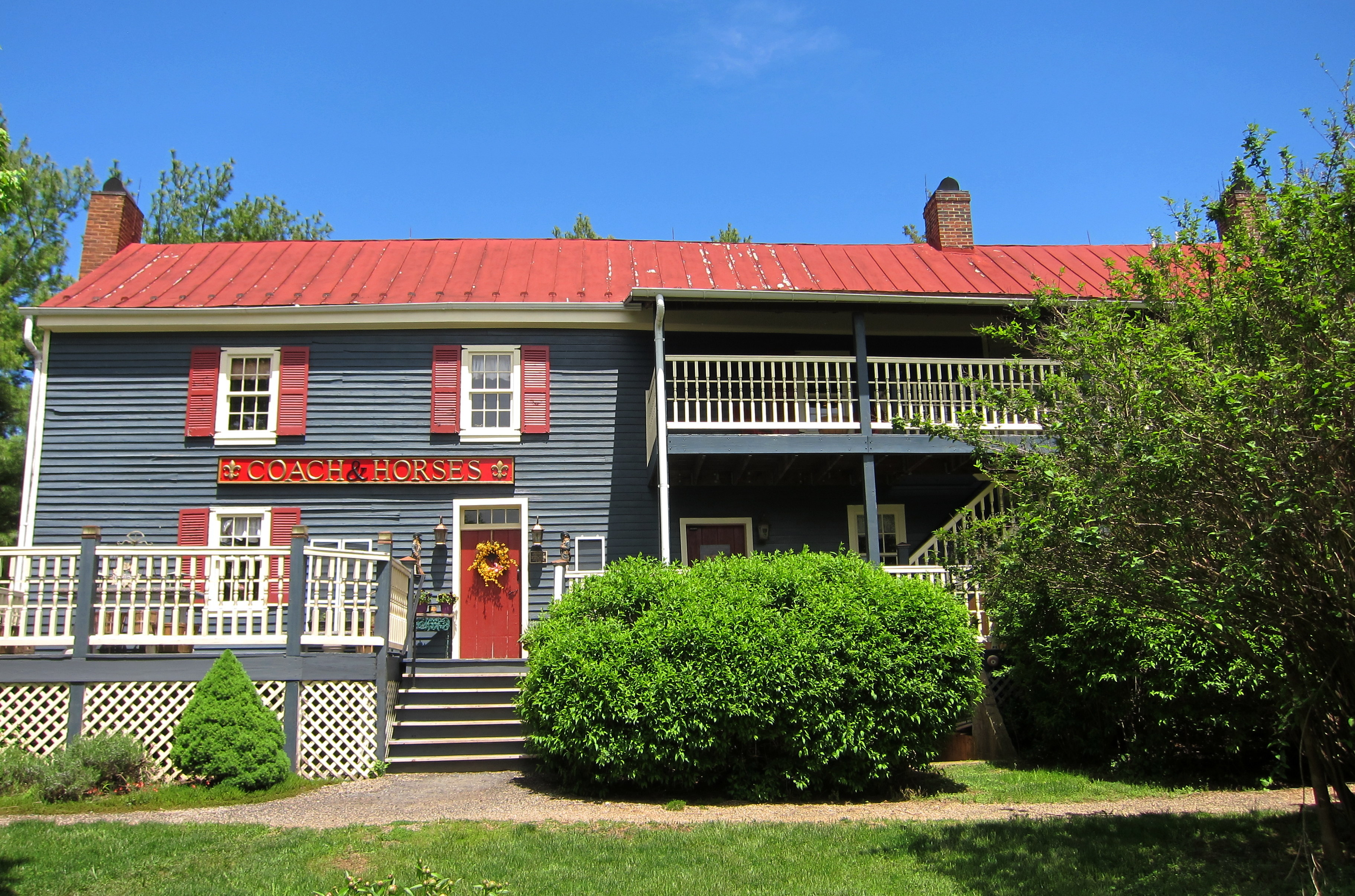

- Location within Virginia Location within the United States
- Location: 949 Cedar Creek Grade, near Winchester, Virginia
- Coordinates: 39°9′46″N 78°11′40″W
- Area: less than one acre
- Built: c. 1795, c. 1820
- Architectural style: Early Republic, Dogtrot
- NRHP reference No.: 02001671
- VLR No.: 034-0180

Significant dates
- Added to NRHP: December 31, 2002
- Designated VLR: June 12, 2002

Homespun, also known as the Bell House, is a historic home located near Winchester, Frederick County, Virginia. It is a vernacular, 2 1/2-story log, frame, stone and brick structure dating from the late 18th and early 19th centuries. The earliest section was built in the 1790s, and is a three-bay wooden structure consisting of two log pens with a frame connector, or dogtrot, and covered with weatherboards. A two-story, two-bay, stone and brick addition was built about 1820. Also on the property is a contributing stone smokehouse.

It was listed on the National Register of Historic Places in 2002.
