= Homespun (XTC album) =

Demo album by XTC
- Released: 5 October 1999
- Studio: Home studios of Colin Moulding and Andy Partridge
- Genre: Pop rock
- Length: 48:12
- Language: English
- Label: Cooking Vinyl/Idea
- Producer: XTC

XTC other chronology
Transistor Blast: The Best of the BBC Sessions (1998)	Homespun (1999)	Homegrown (2001)

Professional ratings
Review scores
Source	Rating
AllMusic	4/5 stars
Pitchfork Media	7.6/10

Homespun is a demo album by XTC. It was released by Cooking Vinyl and Idea Records. A companion to Apple Venus Volume 1, it has the same running order as its parent album. It was reissued in 2005 as a part of Apple Box.

== Track listing ==
=== CD: COOKCD 188 ===
All songs written by Andy Partridge, except where noted.

1. "River of Orchids" – 4:10
2. "I'd Like That" – 4:47
3. "Easter Theatre" – 4:52
4. "Knights in Shining Karma" – 3:38
5. "Frivolous Tonight" (Colin Moulding) – 3:06
6. "Greenman" – 6:01
7. "Your Dictionary" – 3:14
8. "Fruit Nut" (Moulding) – 2:44
9. "I Can't Own Her" – 5:06
10. "Harvest Festival" – 5:17
11. "The Last Balloon" – 5:17

== Personnel ==
XTC

- Colin Moulding
- Andy Partridge
