= Homespun (band) =

English pop/folk band

Homespun was an English pop/folk band formed in 2003 by Dave Rotheray from the Beautiful South. Homespun was originally a side project, designed as an outlet for Rotheray's solo compositions. Other band members were Sam Brown, Melvin Duffy, Tony Robinson, Clare Mactaggart, Gary Hammond and Alan Jones.

The band recorded three critically acclaimed albums, Homespun (2003), Effortless Cool (2005), and Short Stories from East Yorkshire (2008). On this final album, Rotheray introduced guest vocals to the format, with contributions from Eleanor McEvoy and Mary Coughlan. All the Homespun albums and singles were released on Rotheray’s own Homespun Recordings label.

The band toured the UK four times, playing mostly in folk clubs and small venues. The band split up in August 2008, with Rotheray stating his intention to pursue a solo career. All other band members are still active in music. For example Melvin Duffy joined Squeeze in 2019, having played as a session musician on Squeeze's previous two albums, and at occasional live shows.

== Discography ==
=== Albums ===
==== Homespun (2003) ====
1. "Unfortunately Young"
2. "Did You Ever?"
3. "Don't Force Me to be Free"
4. "Anniversary Rag"
5. "Let Me Be Good"
6. "I'm in Your Head"
7. "Lonely Together"
8. "Days"
9. "Your Radio"
10. "Footsteps"
11. "Sundial"

==== Effortless Cool (2005) ====
1. "Sweetness"
2. "If We're So Happy"
3. "Love Will Come Around"
4. "Italy"
5. "Effortless Cool"
6. "Rubber Duck"
7. "A Minute"
8. "Whistlestop Blues"
9. "Cosy Island Lullaby"
10. "The Reluctant Sailor"
11. "If God Was a Girl"
12. "You Are Here"

==== Short Stories from East Yorkshire (2008) ====
1. "Short Story"
2. "My Sorrows Learned to Swim"
3. "Happiness Passes"
4. "Driver"
5. "First People on Earth"
6. "Memo to Self"
7. "Magician's Daughter"
8. "Yorkshire Ghost"
9. "Watching"
10. "Lover's Chapel"
11. "Screen Goes Black"
12. "Rendezvous Roulade"

=== Singles ===
==== "If We're So Happy" (2005) ====
1. "If We're So Happy"
2. "Whistlestop Blues"
3. "Lonely Together"

==== "Effortless Cool" (2005) ====
1. "Effortless Cool" (single version)
2. "Unfortunately Young"
3. "We Can Swing Together" (live)
