= Easter Theatre =

Single by XTC

from the album Apple Venus Volume 1
- Released: 2 April 1999
- Recorded: 1998
- Genre: Chamber pop
- Length: 4:37
- Label: Cooking Vinyl
- Songwriter(s): Andy Partridge
- Producer(s): Haydn Bendall; Nick Davies

XTC singles chronology
"The Ballad of Peter Pumpkinhead" (1992)	"Easter Theatre" (1999)	"I'd Like That" (1999)

Audio sample
- file; help

"Easter Theatre" is a song written by Andy Partridge of the English rock band XTC, released as the lead single from their 1999 album Apple Venus Volume 1. According to Partridge, the lyrics were an attempt to match a "muddy" ascending chord progression. "There's the little melodic figure at the beginning, which I thought sounded medieval and earthy, combined with placid, droning high keyboard chords, which sound like you're floating—so it suggested floating over a land." He further elaborated in an interview with Guitar Player magazine: "The ascending figure sounds like something pushing up and growing out - like springtime. The whole meaning of the song came out of the onomatopoeia of these ascending chords."

Partridge called "Easter Theatre" one of the few "perfect songs" of his career in a 2010 interview for the XTC fansite Chalkhills, feeling that he had "exorcized a lot of those kind of Lennon-and-McCartney, Bacharach-and-David, Brian Wilson type ghosts out of my system" with the song. He jokingly apologized for "the fake Brian May guitar solo ... I thought it was really incongruous, but everyone thought I should leave it." Demo and instrumental versions of the song appear on Homespun (1999) and Instruvenus (2002), respectively.

== Personnel ==
XTC

- Andy Partridge – vocals, electric guitar, keyboards
- Colin Moulding – bass, backing vocals
- Dave Gregory – Mellotron, acoustic guitar, keyboard programming

Additional performers

- Prairie Prince – drums, percussion
- Steve Sidwell – trumpet
