= Gavin Wright =

American economist

Gavin Wright (born 1943) is an economic historian and the William Robertson Coe Professor of American economic history at Stanford University. He received his B.A. from Swarthmore College and his Ph.D. with distinction from Yale University. He has taught at that institution, the University of Michigan, the University of California at Berkeley, the University of Cambridge, and Oxford University.

Wright has published nine books and dozens of scholarly articles. Most of his research has focused on the economics of the U.S. Civil War and the civil rights movement.

== Selected publications ==
- Reckoning with Slavery. Oxford, England: Oxford U. Press, 1976 (co-ed).
- The Political Economy of the Cotton South: Households, Markets, and Wealth in the Nineteenth Century. New York: W. W. Norton, 1978. ISBN 0-393-09038-8.
- Technique, Spirit and Form in the Making of Modern Economies. Bingley, England: JAI Press, 1984 (c-ed).
- Old South, New South: Revolutions in the Southern Economy Since the Civil War. New York: Basic Books, 1986. ISBN 0-8071-2098-7.
- The Mosaic of Economic Growth. Stanford U. Press, 1996 (co-ed). ISBN 0-804-72604-3.
- Slavery and American Economic Development. Baton Rouge: Louisiana State University Press, 2006. ISBN 0-8071-3183-0.
- The Japanese Economy in Retrospect. Hackensack, NJ: World Scientific, 2010 (co-ed).
- Sharing the Prize: The Economics of the Civil Rights Revolution in the American South. Cambridge: Harvard University Press, 2013. ISBN 978-0-674-04933-8.
