= Apple Venus Volume 1 =

- Vinyl sleeve art; CD cover features the same illustration rotated left by 90 degrees

Studio album by XTC
- Released: 17 February 1999
- Recorded: 1997–1998
- Genre: Pop; symphonic pop; orchestral pop; alternative pop
- Length: 50:09
- Label: Idea; Cooking Vinyl
- Producer: Haydn Bendall; Nick Davis

XTC chronology
Nonsuch (1992)	Apple Venus Volume 1 (1999)	Wasp Star (Apple Venus Volume 2) (2000)

Singles from Apple Venus Volume 1
- 1. "Easter Theatre" Released: 2 April 1999; 2. "I'd Like That" Released: 14 June 1999

Apple Venus Volume 1 is the thirteenth studio album by the English rock band XTC, released on February 17, 1999. It was the first on the band's own Idea Records label, distributed through Cooking Vinyl in the United Kingdom and TVT Records in the United States. The album relies heavily on strings, acoustic guitars and keyboards, expanding upon the more orchestral approach developed on the group's previous LP Nonsuch (1992), whilst its lyrics reflect themes of paganism, middle age, romance and rebirth. Apple Venus Volume 1 was met with critical acclaim and moderate commercial success, peaking at number 42 on the UK Albums Chart and number 106 on the Billboard 200 in the US.

Bandleader Andy Partridge, who wrote most of Apple Venus, characterised it as "orchustic" (a portmanteau of "orchestral" and "acoustic"). He meant for the album title to refer to "a beautiful woman". The album effectively marked a comeback for XTC, who spent half the decade on strike against their former label Virgin Records. Apple Venus was originally planned as a double album, but because the group did not have enough money to record all the material they had stockpiled, they elected to split the more rock-oriented songs as "volume two" (released one year later as Wasp Star).

The making of Volume 1 was fraught with personal conflicts, budgetary concerns and numerous false starts. Most of the orchestral portions were rush-recorded in one day with a 40-piece symphony at Abbey Road Studios, and had to be edited over a months-spanning period. It was the group's last album with guitarist and keyboardist Dave Gregory, who departed during the sessions due to frustrations with Partridge. By the time of its release, Partridge no longer viewed XTC as a band, and preferred it to be known as a "brand" covering his and Colin Moulding's music.

In late 1999, XTC released Homespun, a version of Apple Venus consisting of its demos. This was followed in 2002 with Instruvenus, containing the album's backing tracks. In 2003, Mojo ranked Apple Venus at number 47 in its list of the "Top 50 Eccentric Albums". The album was included in the book 1001 Albums You Must Hear Before You Die.

== Background ==
XTC's previous album, Nonsuch, was received with critical acclaim when released in April 1992. The song "Wrapped in Grey" was intended as the third single from the album, but was immediately withdrawn by their label Virgin Records. This left bandleader Andy Partridge particularly dismayed with the label. In 1993, he conceived the band's next project to be an album of bubblegum pop songs; the LP would have disguised itself as a retrospective compilation featuring 12 different groups from the early 1970s. The lyrics were heavily sexual, with song titles such as "Lolly (Suck It and See)" and "Visit to the Doctor". Partridge recalled playing some demos for Virgin agents, who rejected the project; he compared their reaction to the "Springtime for Hitler" scene from Mel Brooks' film The Producers.

Virgin also denied Partridge's requests to renegotiate or revoke XTC's contract. A&R representative Paul Kinder said: "What XTC wanted and what Virgin were prepared to do were poles apart. The contract was so old it got to the point where Andy wanted the moon and Virgin weren't prepared to give it him." Whatever new music the band recorded would have been automatically owned by Virgin, and so the group went on strike, refusing to record new material. Partridge was also beset by health issues and in the process of divorcing his first wife at the time.

In 1997 (also reported as in late 1994), the band found themselves freed from financial debt and Virgin after "making some heavy concessions"; Partridge fantasied that the label had taken pity on the band for giving them a "rotten deal". He expressed distaste with the word "comeback" to describe Apple Venus, telling an interviewer in 1998: "We never went away! We just weren't legally allowed to work. Comebacks always have such glittery-suit, Fablon, working-men's clubs connotations."

== Composition and lyrics ==
By 1997, Partridge and bassist Colin Moulding had amassed over 40 new songs, most of which were written by the former. The 11 that were ultimately selected for Apple Venus Volume 1 were written between 1992 and 1994. Partridge's offerings were an elaboration on the orchestral style he had developed on the Nonsuch tracks "Omnibus", "Wrapped in Grey" and "Rook". When Nonsuch was completed, Partridge purchased an E-mu Proteus, and felt inspired by its samples, even though he was not a proficient keyboard player. His writing process changed in that, for some cases, the arrangement was completed before the actual composition. The songs changed little from how they were conceived on their early demo tapes when recorded in a professional studio.

"River of Orchids"
Opening track "River of Orchids". Partridge: "That started as a wonderful little loop I came up with. ... [I wrote three] very simple nursery rhythm-type melodies, and wrestled them to the ground, made them fit each other. Then we got a 40-piece orchestra at Abbey Road to play it through."

Most of the lyrical content of Apple Venus is centred on pagan themes, including the songs "River of Orchids", "Easter Theatre", "Greenman" and "Harvest Festival". Partridge thought the new material was "some of the best stuff, if not the best stuff" that he had ever written, calling it "more intensely passionate than before." In particular, he viewed "Easter Theatre" as one of the few "perfect songs" of his career, feeling that he had "exorcized a lot of those kind of Lennon-and-McCartney, Bacharach-and-David, Brian Wilson type ghosts out of my system by doing all that." "Greenman" was inspired by Green Man sculptures and pagan-derived nursery rhymes he saw Martin Carthy perform on a children's television program. He denied that the song was supposed to be Middle Eastern-sounding. "Harvest Festival" is Partridge's reflection on school harvest festivals from his youth. In an interview with New Sounds, Partridge confirmed that it was him, not Gregory, who played the guitar solo on "Easter Theatre": "I was determined not to tremolo like he would have done."

Even though the record's instrumental palette relies largely on orchestral strings, acoustic guitars and keyboards, there are a few exceptions where electric instrumentation can be heard. Additional textures are provided by brass, violins, woodwinds and only a few instances of percussion. Moulding felt that "something a bit different" was appropriate for the band at this juncture, and shared Partridge's desire for a cohesive LP similar to soundtracks such as My Fair Lady and "stuff that Burt Bacharach wrote for various [films]". The only songs of Moulding's that were included were "Fruit Nut" and "Frivolous Tonight", which ended up as the album's most uptempo tracks. According to Moulding, "Frivolous Tonight" was harmonically inspired by the Beach Boys and had a melody similar to "the theme song from Steptoe and Son...I smashed them together, and it worked out very well."

"Your Dictionary" was Partridge's reaction to the dissolution of his marriage. He initially did not want to include it on the album, but was persuaded by acquaintances who enjoyed the song. The same was true of "I Can't Own Her", which Partridge thought was "a little square, and a little wet". He credited "the core of the song" to the album's orchestral arranger Mike Batt. "I'd Like That" was inspired by a rekindled relationship with Erica Wexler, an American woman he met in the 1980s and would later marry. The music for the closing track "The Last Balloon" stemmed from an aborted collaboration between Partridge and an Italian musician, whereas the title came from The Last Balloon Home, one of the working titles for Nonsuch. It features a flugelhorn solo and lyrics about "that hope for the future, for your children -- for them not to make the same fucking mistakes as you!"

== Production ==
The group elected to divide the Apple Venus project into two parts: one of rock songs, and the other of "orchustic" songs augmented by a 40-piece symphony. "It's still a pop album," Moulding said. "It's not like 'XTC Meets the London Philharmonic.'" They found a label, Cooking Vinyl, and a producer, Haydn Bendall, who previously engineered the band's 1977 debut EP 3D and had experience recording orchestras. Former Tubes drummer Prairie Prince, who had played on XTC's 1986 album Skylarking, returned for the sessions. It soon became apparent that the band did not have the funds to record all the material they had.

Moulding, Bendall and guitarist Dave Gregory wanted to reduce the project to one disc, but Partridge insisted on spreading it over two LPs. It was decided that the group would release one album with the orchestral material ("volume 1") and leave the rock songs for "volume 2". Preliminary "programming sessions" were conducted at Bendall's home in late 1997. The group then commenced recording at Chris Difford's home studio in Sussex, but the sessions fell apart after two weeks. Moulding said that the group had to leave because the studio was not yet fully functioning. According to Partridge in a 2007 interview, Difford "stole" the master tapes from these sessions, forcing the band to re-record the album from scratch twice (as the second run-through was deemed unsatisfactory).

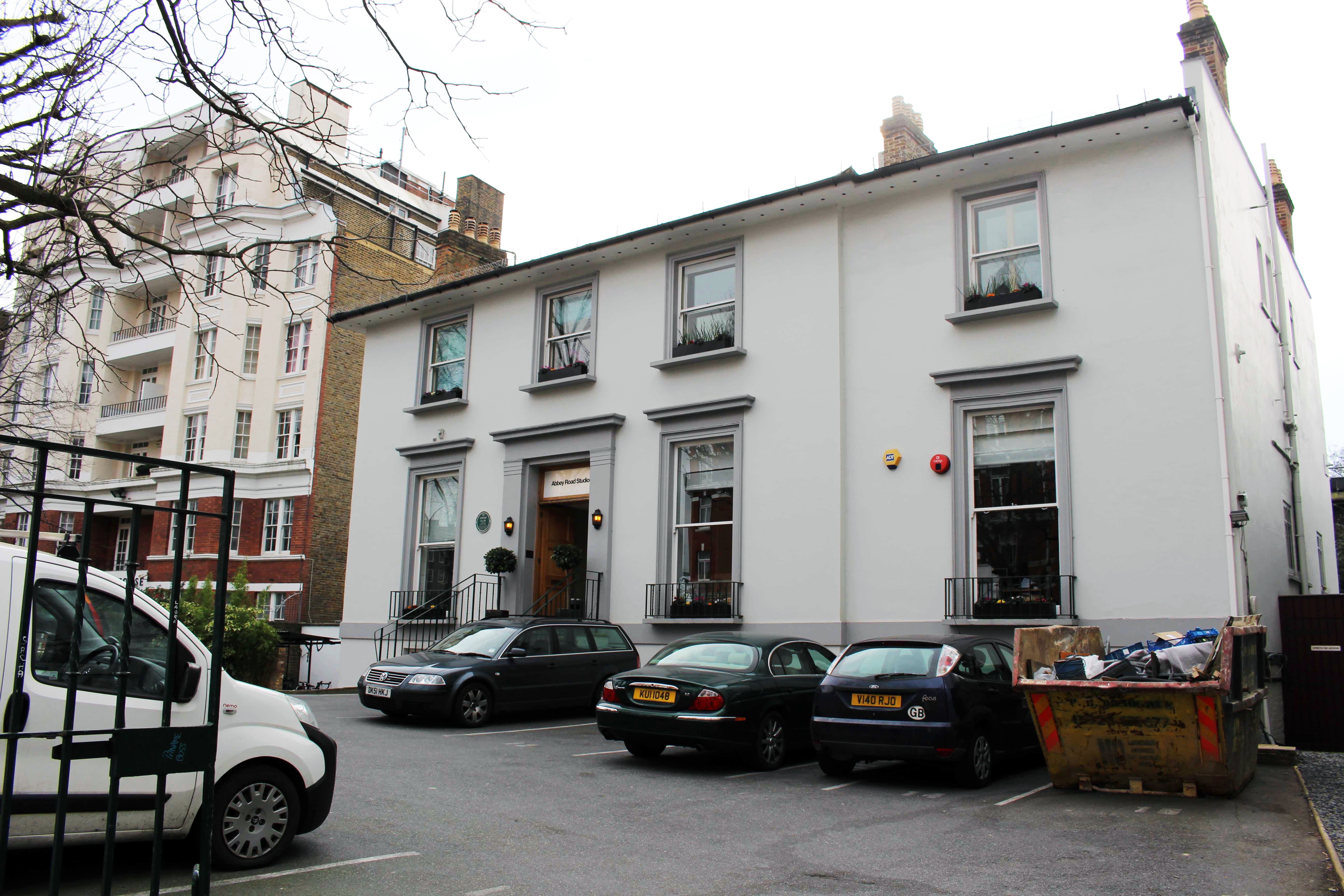
The one-day session at Abbey Road cost the band £15,000 (equivalent to £29,000 in 2025).

In early 1998, the group reconvened at Chipping Norton Recording Studios and recorded backing tracks over the course of six weeks. A single orchestral session was held at Abbey Road Studios, but its recording was rushed and had to be edited over a three-month period. According to Gregory, the band had no money left at this point, and the session had to be funded by a Japanese record label. John Morrish of The Independent reported that "the human string players could not match the mathematical precision of 'River of Orchids' ... Nor could the woodwinds cope with the computerised ostinato in 'Greenman' ... The orchestra became a glorified sample, cut and pasted together to achieve the 'Vaughan Williams with a hard-on' sound required." Much of this work was done in Pro Tools, with the assistance of Bendall "until he had to quit to work on other projects." The rest of the album, which mostly involved vocal, bass and acoustic guitar overdubs, was recorded in Moulding's garage.

== Gregory's departure ==
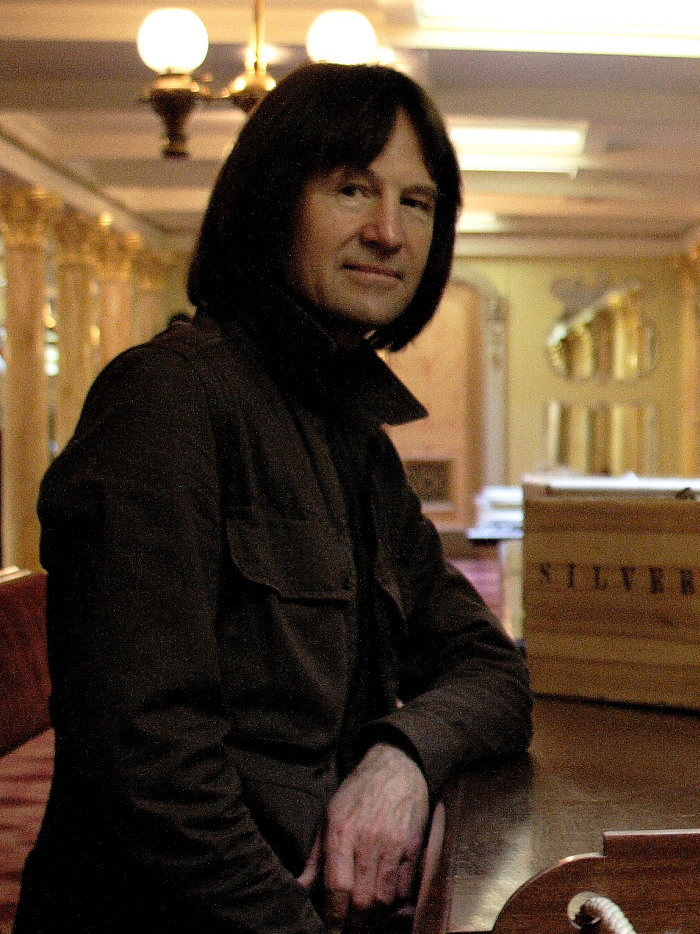
Longtime XTC guitarist Dave Gregory (pictured 2010) left the band during the Apple Venus sessions due to "personal problems"

In March 1998, a few weeks into the Chipping Norton sessions, Gregory abruptly quit the band. Partridge told journalists that Gregory left because he grew impatient with the recording of the orchestral material and wanted to quickly move on to the recording of the second volume of the project. He attributed Gregory's frustration to diabetic mood swings: "one minute he'd be quite jolly, the next minute he's 'this is all shit, destroy it, wipe it, it's all terrible''". Moulding was not present for an "enormous row" between Gregory and Partridge at the studio, but he corroborated that Gregory's diabetes caused "terrible mood swings, and his negativity was sometimes hard to take. But also, there really wasn't much for him to do on this record and he felt left out." Discussing the incident at Chipping Norton, Gregory said Partridge had behaved like "a cunt, frankly." Partridge said "I really blew up. I had a go at everyone but a lot of it was directed at Dave, telling him to pull his weight and get into it more. I don't think he ever forgave me."

Gregory denied that his leaving pertained to "musical differences", and said that it was more "personal problems" related to Partridge spending the entire recording budget on the Abbey Road session. Another source of frustration was his keyboard playing; he did not feel that he had the skill that was demanded from Partridge and Bendall, "and the end result wasn't justifying the means." When Partridge requested Gregory to write musical charts for the 40-piece orchestra, Gregory turned in a cheaper arrangement for four players, which was rejected; Gregory quoted Partridge saying "Compromise equals crap art". Once another arranger was hired, he began distancing himself from the band. Partridge remembered: "You'd be doing an interview and you'd say the band's doing so-and-so, and he'd interrupt and say, 'Band? It's not a bloody band, it's two people making solo albums and a guitarist ... Anyway, carry on.'" Gregory also refused to sign an American distribution contract with TVT Records. He had telephoned artists who worked for the label and got "the worst possible reaction ... 'You will not be paid,' those were the four words I remember."

Gregory told Partridge that Apple Venus was not "the album we should be making after six years," calling it "the vegetarian alternative." By the time the album was released, he maintained that "Andy's done a good job in recording the songs." Partridge also no longer viewed XTC as a band, instead preferring it to be known as a "brand" covering his and Moulding's music.

== Title and packaging ==
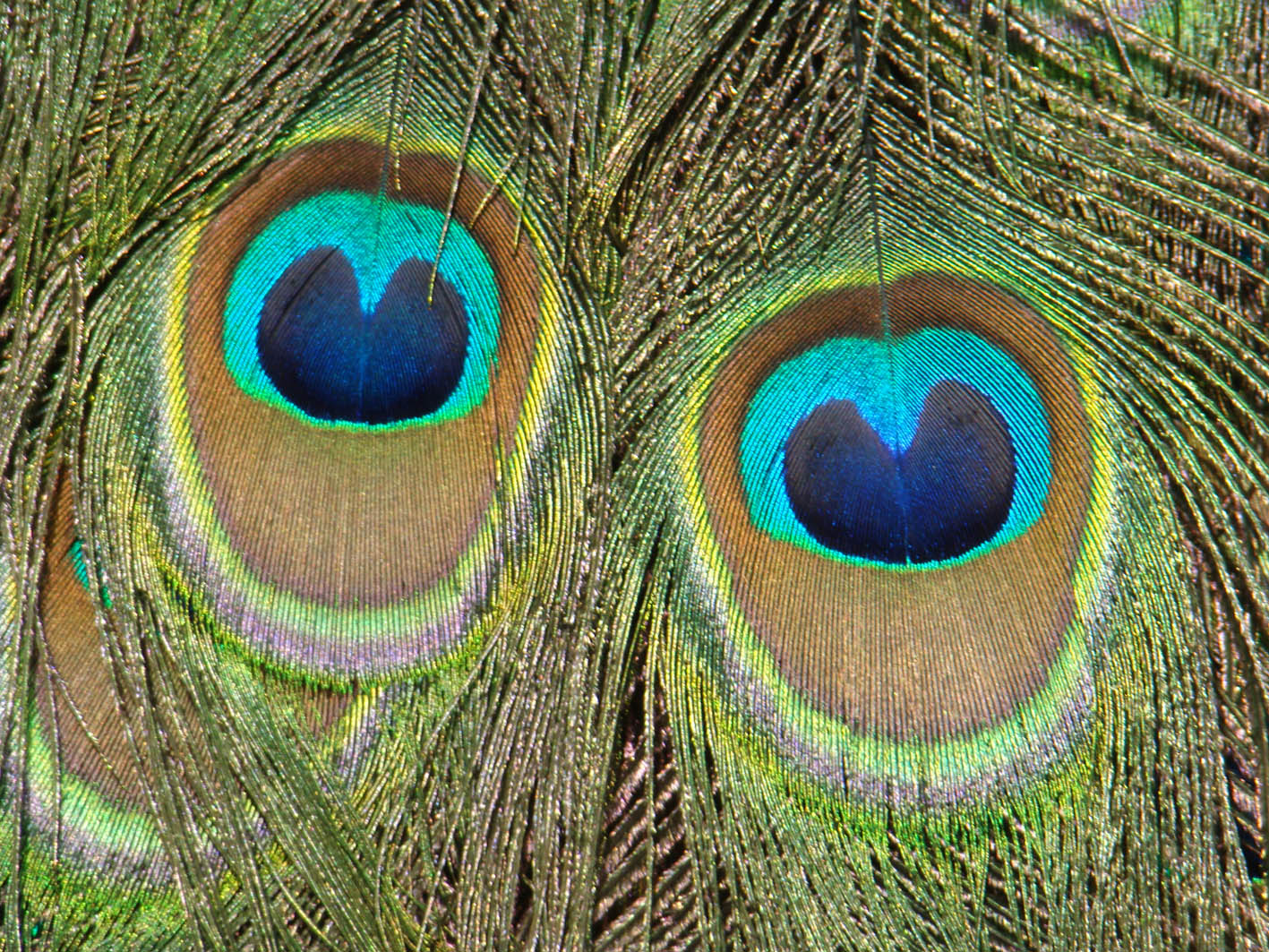
Indian peafowl feathers similar to the one on the album cover. The image was chosen by Partridge for its evocation of female anatomy.

The album's title was meant to refer to "a beautiful woman". The phrase originated as a lyric on the previous XTC record, Nonsuch, specifically in Partridge's song "Then She Appeared" ("then she appeared / apple venus on a half-open shell"). This continued a trend that began with Oranges & Lemons (1989) and Nonsuch: both album titles had appeared as lyrics on a track from their respective prior albums. According to Partridge, this was at first "pure coincidence, probably a sub-conscious kind of thing. You have a certain caterpillar track of words that kind of trundle around in your head." However, it was deliberate in the case of Apple Venus.

Partridge's working title for the album, A History of the Middle Ages, was vetoed by his bandmates. He settled on Apple Venus after finding an illustration of a peacock feather that resembled an uvula, which evoked to him something "very vulvic and female". Written underneath the track listing on the back of the album cover is a version of the Wiccan Rede: "do what you will but harm none." Partridge thought it was a "fantastic" message; when responding to an interview question about his knowledge of Wicca, he explained: "I have a smattering of knowledge of that sort of thing, but I['m] also ... interested in the pre-Christian appreciation of the land and the spirit of things, spirits in animate things and inanimate things."

in Japan, the liner notes included comments from musicians such as Tamio Okuda and Aiha Higurashi of Seagull Screaming Kiss Her Kiss Her (named after the XTC song from The Big Express).

== Release ==
Professional ratings
Review scores
Source	Rating
AllMusic	4.5/5 stars
Entertainment Weekly	A−
The Guardian	4/5 stars
Los Angeles Times	3.5/4 stars
NME	7/10
Pitchfork	8.2/10
Q	4/5 stars
Rolling Stone	3.5/5 stars
Spin	8/10
The Village Voice	B+

Released on 2 March 1999, Apple Venus Volume 1 was met with critical acclaim and moderate sales. It had minimal promotion. PopMatters' Sarah Zupko deemed the album "more than worth the wait. Andy Partridge and Colin Moulding used their time off well, lavishing extra care and attention on this set of tunes that rank among the best music they have ever produced. ... this record is a shoo-in for one of 1999’s best records". Scott Schinder gave the album an A− for Entertainment Weekly, writing: "The gorgeous yet vaguely unsettling arrangements are well suited to the exquisitely flawed humanism of Andy Partridge’s and Colin Moulding’s compositions, lending an appropriately uneasy edge to bittersweet tunes like 'I Can’t Own Her,' 'Greenman,' and 'The Last Balloon.'"

In comparing the album to the group's earlier work, Pitchfork's Zach Hooker said: "Apple Venus finds them picking up pretty much where they left off. Or maybe even a little bit before they left off." Stylistically, he regarded the album as a midpoint between Oranges and Lemons and Skylarking and "a little nestegg of excellent songs". Rolling Stone's Barry Walters wrote that the LP "packs the wit and nerve that made their rock snap but does it with brass, acoustic guitars, violins, woodwinds and minimal percussion. ... instead of evoking the Sixties, Partridge and Moulding suggest a timeless pastoral past rich with melody and subtlety." Stephen Thomas Erlewine of AllMusic noted: "Although there are similarities with the pastoral Skylarking or parts of Nonsuch, there is really no comparable record in XTC's canon, given its sustained mood, experimentalism, and glimpses of confession ... [Apple Venus] easily ranks as one of XTC's greatest works".

Conversely, Robert Christgau wrote that "Studio rats being studio rats, the lyrics aren't as deep as Andy and Colin think they are, but at least irrelevant doesn't equal obscure, humorless, or lachrymose." The Chicago Tribune's Greg Kot warned that the album could be "perhaps too radical [of a] departure" for veteran fans. The Daily Telegraph's Alexis Petridis commented that while it is a "minor quibble", the album's "worst excess" may be its "whimsy". NME's Jim Wirth wrote that even though Partridge and Moulding have a "nasty habit of hammering really hard on the twee pedal in moments of boredom, there's still enough of that psychedelic bumpkin magic to make this worth celebrating."

In late 1999, XTC released Homespun, a compilation of demo recordings of the album's songs. This was followed in 2002 with Instruvenus, containing the album's backing tracks. Wasp Star (Apple Venus Volume 2) was released on 23 May 2000.

== Track listing ==
All tracks are written by Andy Partridge, except "Frivolous Tonight" and "Fruit Nut" by Colin Moulding.

No.	Title	Length
1.	"River of Orchids"	5:53
2.	"I'd Like That"	3:50
3.	"Easter Theatre"	4:37
4.	"Knights in Shining Karma"	3:39
5.	"Frivolous Tonight"	3:10
6.	"Greenman"	6:17
7.	"Your Dictionary"	3:14
8.	"Fruit Nut"	3:01
9.	"I Can't Own Her"	5:26
10.	"Harvest Festival"	4:15
11.	"The Last Balloon"	6:40
Total length:		50:09

== Personnel ==
Per liner notes.

XTC

- Colin Moulding – vocals, bass guitar
- Andy Partridge – vocals, guitars, keyboards, programming, recorder on “Harvest Festival”

Additional musicians

- Mike Batt – orchestral arrangements and conductor on "Greenman" and "I Can't Own Her"
- Haydn Bendall – keyboards
- Guy Barker – trumpet and flugelhorn solo on "The Last Balloon"
- Nick Davis – keyboards
- Dave Gregory – piano, keyboards, programming, guitars, backing vocals
- Prairie Prince – drums, percussion
- Steve Sidwell – trumpet solo on "Easter Theatre"
- All arrangements played by the London Session Orchestra under their leader Gavin [sic] Wright

Production

- Haydn Bendall – original production, engineering
- Nick Davis – additional production, engineering, mixing
- Simon Dawson – mix assistance
- Alan Douglas – recording engineering
- Barry Hammond – recording engineer
- Tim Young – mastering

== Charts ==
Chart performance for Apple Venus Volume 1
Chart (1999)	Peak position
Australian Albums (ARIA)	74
Canadian Albums (RPM)	39
Japanese Albums (Oricon)	141
Scottish Albums (OCC)	80
UK Albums (OCC)	42
UK Independent Albums (OCC)	5
US Billboard 200	106
