= Andy Partridge =

English musician (born 1953)

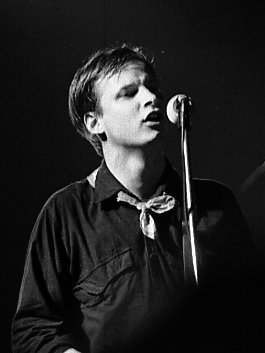
- Partridge in Toronto's Music Hall, February 1980

Background information
- Also known as: Sir John Johns, Sandy Sandwich
- Born: Andrew John Partridge; 11 November 1953 (age 73); Mtarfa, Malta
- Origin: Swindon, Wiltshire, England
- Occupations: Musician; songwriter; record producer
- Instruments: Vocals; guitar; keyboards; harmonica
- Years active: 1969–present
- Labels: Virgin; CBS; Geffen; Cooking Vinyl; Idea; Ape House
- Website: ape.uk.net

Andrew John Partridge (born 11 November 1953) is an English guitarist, singer-songwriter and record producer best known for co-founding the band XTC. He and Colin Moulding each acted as a songwriter and frontman for XTC, with Partridge writing and singing about two-thirds of the group's material. While XTC were a formative British new wave group, Partridge's songwriting drew heavily from 1960s pop and psychedelia and his style gradually shifted to more traditional pop, often with pastoral themes. The band's only UK top 10 hit, "Senses Working Overtime", was written by Partridge.

Partridge is sometimes regarded as the "godfather" of the 1990s Britpop movement. Since the 1980s, he has worked, written with or produced for many other recording artists, including collaborative albums with Peter Blegvad, Harold Budd and Robyn Hitchcock. From 2002 to 2006, Partridge's APE House record label released several volumes of his demos and songs as part of the Fuzzy Warbles series. Beyond music, he is also an illustrator, toy soldier hobbyist and designer of board games.

== Early life ==
Andrew John Partridge was born on 11 November 1953 at Mtarfa Royal Navy Hospital in Mtarfa, Malta, to English parents. He grew up on Penhill council estate in Swindon, Wiltshire. Partridge was an only child. His father John was a navy signalman, and his mother Vera a retail assistant in a chemist's shop. When Partridge entered adolescence, it was discovered that his father was having an extramarital affair; his mother consequently had a nervous breakdown, leading to her being institutionalised. She "verbally disowned" Andy once he started growing his hair long.

As a teenager, Partridge was a fan of contemporary pop groups like the Beatles, but was intimidated by the process of learning guitar. When the Monkees grew popular, he became interested in joining a music group. He recalled watching local guitarist Dave Gregory performing Jimi Hendrix-style songs at churches and youth clubs: "Sort of acid-skiffle. I thought, 'Ah, one day I'll play guitar!' But I didn't think I would be in the same band as this kid on the stage." He was a good whistler as a boy, trying to learn finger whistling too and including his whistling in his song "Papersnow". He was particularly fond of psychedelic records such as Pink Floyd's "See Emily Play" (1967), Tomorrow's "My White Bicycle" (1967), and the Moles' "We Are the Moles" (1968). The first records he ever bought were the Beatles' Sgt. Pepper's Lonely Hearts Club Band (1967) and the Monkees' self-titled debut (1966).

Partridge eventually obtained a guitar, taught himself how to play it with no formal training, and immediately took to writing songs. He submitted a caricature of Monkee Micky Dolenz to Monkees Monthly's Draw a Monkee competition and won, using the £10 prize to buy a Grundig tape recorder. At the age of 15 he wrote his first song, titled "Please Help Me", and while in Swindon College attracted the nickname "Rocky" for his early guitar mastery of the Beatles' "Rocky Raccoon". Partridge eventually dropped out of school and formed the first of several "loud and horrid" rock bands with the purpose of meeting girls.

By the early 1970s, his music tastes had accordingly transitioned "from the Monkees to having a big binge on this Euro-avant-garde stuff. I got really in deep." One of his first bands was called "Stiff Beach", formed in August 1970. In early 1972, Partridge's constantly evolving group settled into a four-piece called "Star Park". By then, he had found a job at a record shop and was engrossed with bands such as the Stooges, the New York Dolls, Alice Cooper, and Pink Fairies.

== XTC ==
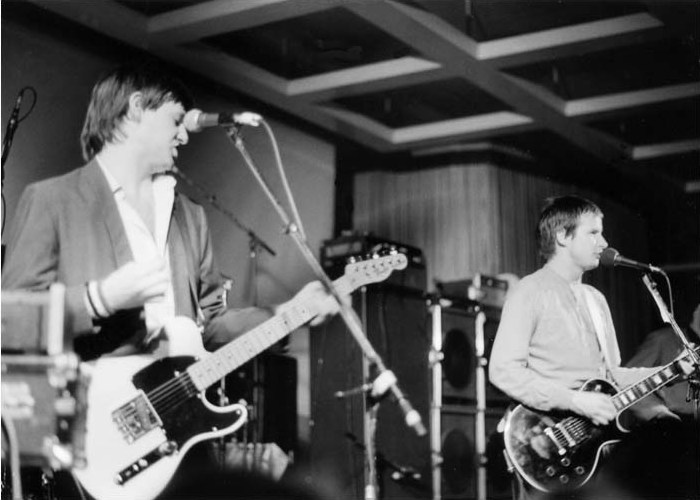
XTC performing live (from left: guitarist Dave Gregory and Partridge)

In late 1972, Partridge's Star Park was joined by bassist Colin Moulding and drummer Terry Chambers. The band became known as XTC in 1975 and signed to Virgin Records in 1977. Partridge wrote the majority of XTC's songs, was the band's frontman and de facto leader, and in Moulding's view, typically acted as an "executive producer" for their albums. His early XTC songs were marked by his distinct singing style, something he jokingly described as a "walrus" or "seal bark", but otherwise an amalgamation of Buddy Holly's "hiccup", Elvis Presley's vibrato, and "the howled mannerisms of Steve Harley." He later dismissed most of his initial output as premature songs "built around this electric wordplay stuff".

While XTC were a formative punk group, Partridge's music drew heavily from British Invasion songwriters, and his style gradually shifted to more traditional pop, often with pastoral themes. Music critic John Harris said that Partridge exemplified "a very English genre: rock music uprooted from the glamour and dazzle of the city, and recast as the soundtrack to life in suburbs, small towns, and the kind of places – like Swindon – that may be more sizeable, but are still held up as bywords for broken hopes and limited horizons." He cited Partridge's 1981 song "Respectable Street" as one of the "most evocative items" in his catalog.

"Senses Working Overtime" (1982)
The band's only British top 10 hit, "Senses Working Overtime", was written and sung by Partridge.

In 1982, as XTC were about to headline a tour of the United States in support of English Settlement, they permanently withdrew from concert touring after Partridge suffered an onstage breakdown of some sort, and XTC remained a studio-only band from then on. For a period afterward, it was rumoured among fans and industry insiders that the group had stopped performing because Partridge had died, and some American bands put on XTC tribute shows in his remembrance. The group ran into more problems once it was discovered that poor management led to them incurring hundreds of thousands in unpaid value-added taxes. Partridge said that he was eventually left with "about £300 in the bank, which is really heavy when you've got a family and everyone thinks you're 'Mr Rich and Famous'."

In December 1984, Partridge formed the Dukes of Stratosphear, a neo-psychedelic XTC offshoot that he envisioned as a pastiche of "your favourite bands from 1967". They recorded the mini-album 25 O'Clock (1985) and the LP Psonic Psunspot (1987), both of which outsold XTC's concurrent studio albums (The Big Express and Skylarking) in the UK. Around this time, Partridge also established himself as a producer of other artists. However, Virgin Records refused to allow XTC to act as their own producers, which sometimes caused tensions between Partridge and whoever was assigned to produce the band. According to Partridge, he generally got along with the band's producers, except for Todd Rundgren on Skylarking and Gus Dudgeon on 1992's Nonsuch.

In the 1990s, Partridge was regarded as "godfather" to the nascent Britpop movement due to his earlier work with XTC. They released several more albums on Virgin and two more on their own label, Idea Records, before going on hiatus in 2006. In July 2008, Partridge wrote in the Swindon Advertiser that XTC had dissolved "for reasons too personal and varied to go into here, but we had a good run as they say and produced some real good work."

Partridge has stated that his favourite XTC album was Nonsuch (1992), and considered "Rook" and "Wrapped in Grey" from that album, along with "Easter Theatre" from Apple Venus Volume 1 (1999), to be the "perfect songs" of his career. For many years, he also regarded "Seagulls Screaming Kiss Her Kiss Her" from The Big Express as his finest song.

Since XTC's breakup, Partridge has acted as curator to the band's legacy, overseeing reissues and remasters, and maintaining a web presence. The official XTC Twitter account @xtcfans (now defunct) was originally managed by writer Todd Bernhardt, but Partridge later "sort of took it over, because [he] thought it was weird that there was another person in the way." In 2016, Partridge and Bernhardt released a book, Complicated Game: Inside the Songs of XTC, that contains discussions between the two about 29 XTC songs, one Partridge solo track, and an overview of his approach to songwriting. It was published by Jawbone Press.

== Solo work and collaborations ==
Since the 1980s, Partridge has worked, written with, or produced many other musicians and bands, including Peter Blegvad, the Lilac Time, the Nines, Miles Kane, David Yazbek, Voice of the Beehive, the Woodentops, the Wallflowers, Perennial Divide, the Raiders, and Charlotte Hatherley.

=== 1980s ===
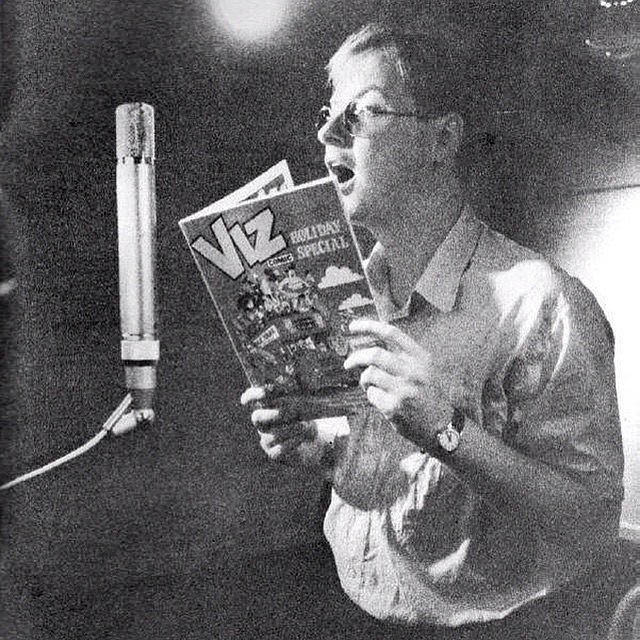
Partridge in the studio, c. 1988

In 1980, Partridge and producer John Leckie released a collection of XTC dub remixes on Virgin Records called Take Away / The Lure of Salvage, credited to "Mr. Partridge". Even though no other XTC member was involved with the album's production, he does not consider it a solo effort. Virgin Records rejected his request to issue it under the XTC banner as it would have counted toward their record contract. In Japan, the record was hailed as a work of "electronic genius" and outsold all other XTC albums.

Also in 1980, Partridge contributed guitar to Ryuichi Sakamoto's album B-2 Unit and lead vocals and guitar to the track "Margaret Freeman" from The Residents' Commercial Album, on which he was credited as "Sandy Sandwich".

Partridge's first job producing another artist was Peter Blegvad's 1983 album The Naked Shakespeare. He said that his services were requested partly because Blegvad had heard a rumour that he had died in 1982.

=== 1990s ===
In 1992, Partridge produced unreleased recordings for Blur's album Modern Life Is Rubbish (1993). He was replaced by Stephen Street at the insistence of their record label, Food. According to Partridge, he was not paid for the expenses and received his session payment only. Three of the tracks he produced were later released on the 2012 box set Blur 21.

In 1993, Partridge recorded and produced an album with Martin Newell, The Greatest Living Englishman. When released in Japan, it was credited as a duo album. The album was well received by critics and ultimately became the most acclaimed of Newell's career. Partridge also wrote four songs for Disney's version of James and the Giant Peach (1996), but was replaced by Randy Newman due to creative differences between director Henry Selick and Disney regarding the choice of soundtrack composer and the fact that Disney wanted to own the copyright to the songs for perpetuity.

Partridge contributed lyrics and vocals to the song "Papersnow" on The Heads' album No Talking, Just Head, released in 1996.

Partridge took on less work as a music producer after the 1990s. He stated in a 2007 interview: "I got asked regularly to produce people, but I said no to everybody; after a while, people just stopped asking. I got sick of the social-worker aspect of it. I found it had very little to do with music ... I also think it's kind of odd that everyone wants to sound like 1979 again."

=== 2000s ===
From 2002 to 2006, Partridge released demos of his songs under his own name as part of the Fuzzy Warbles album series on his APE House record label. Eight volumes of Fuzzy Warbles were made available, as well as The Official Fuzzy Warbles Collector's Album, which includes a bonus ninth disc Hinges. Partridge said that the impetus for the project was the proliferation of bootleggers who were selling low-quality copies of the material. He added that the Fuzzy Warbles set earned him more money than XTC's back catalog on Virgin.

In 2007, Partridge released music as part of a trio known as Monstrance, along with Barry Andrews (an early member of XTC) on keyboards, and Martyn Barker on drums. The group has released an album of the same name, as well as a download-only EP known as Fine Wires Humming a New Song. That same year, he collaborated once again with Andrews on the Shriekback album Glory Bumps.

=== 2010s–2020s ===
In 2010, Partridge released a limited edition CD of music inspired by science fiction illustrator Richard M. Powers' art titled Powers. In 2012, he contributed eight co-written songs to Mike Keneally's album Wing Beat Fantastic. In 2016, he wrote "You Bring the Summer" for the Monkees' reunion album Good Times!; the 2018 follow-up, Christmas Party, included his "Unwrap You at Christmas". He became involved with the reunion project through the band's manager, a former journalist who sought to repay Partridge for an interview conducted decades earlier.

In 2019, Partridge and Robyn Hitchcock completed the 13-years-in-the-making EP Planet England. In September, it was reported that the project would later be followed with a full-length LP of songs inspired by the Beatles. As of 2020, Partridge was working on recording versions of "hundreds of songs" that he originally wrote for other artists over the years. He said he would release them as "a series of records tentatively titled My Failed Songwriting Career".

On 23 July 2021, Partridge released Volume 1 of My Failed Songwriting Career through Burning Shed Records. Tracks included on the EP were "Ghost Train", "Great Day", "Maid Of Stars" and "The Mating Dance". In October 2022, he released My Failed Christmas Career, a collection of seasonal songs written for other artists. That same month, Partridge gave a rare interview in which he stated he has retired from writing new music. In June 2023, Partridge emerged to release a four-song EP with The 3 Clubmen (Partridge, Jen Olive, and Stu Rowe). A project in the works since 2010, Partridge has stated that a future 3 Clubmen release is planned.

== Other activities ==
Partridge-designed album cover for the Dukes of Stratosphear's 25 O'Clock (1985)

Many of the XTC record sleeves were designed by Partridge and at one point he considered a career as a graphic illustrator. He remembered having an intense interest in comic books and the cover illustrations of science fiction novels as a child, particularly those drawn by Richard M. Powers. Until the late 1970s, he owned a large American comic book collection that he had to sell off due to a mouse infestation at his home. Some of his songs are based on characters from DC Comics, namely Sgt. Rock for "Sgt. Rock (Is Going to Help Me)" from Black Sea, Supergirl for "That's Really Super, Supergirl" from Skylarking and Brainiac for "Brainiac's Daughter" from Psonic Psunspot.

Beyond music, Partridge is an avid collector, sculptor, and painter of toy soldiers, an "obsession" he credits to his mother throwing away his toys as a child. In a 1990 interview, he estimated owning thousands of figures since he started collecting them in 1979, and he reported having recently contributed World War I-era designs to an unspecified "firm that makes these war game figures in North England". He has also designed board games, such as one called "Dam and Blast".

During the mid-1980s, Partridge was a regular performer on BBC Radio 1. He has had acting roles, including a character named "Agony Andy", a spoof aunt on the Janice Long show, and he was a regular panelist on Roundtable. In 1987, he filmed a pilot for an ITV children's quiz show, Matchmakers. In 2004, he contributed the theme song to the Fox television series Wonderfalls.

== Personal life ==
Partridge was married to Marianne Wyborn from 1979 to 1994. Together, they had two children: Holly and Harry. Harry is an independent web animator who created the comedic short Saturday Morning Watchmen (2009), and later, Dr. Bees, Starbarians and Trilby Dogtooth. After his divorce, Partridge entered into a long-term relationship with American singer Erica Wexler. Partridge has attributed the subject matter of XTC songs including "Seagulls Screaming Kiss Her Kiss Her" and "Another Satellite" to aspects of their ongoing relationship. Partridge had met Wexler in the early 1980s; they began dating shortly after she split from artist Roy Lichtenstein in 1994, and she has lived with him in Swindon since then.

The subject matter of Partridge's songs frequently touch upon politics, religion, his hometown of Swindon, social class, factory work, insects, comic book characters, seafaring, war, and ancient rituals. Partridge did not become interested in politics until the 1979 United Kingdom general election, in which he voted for Margaret Thatcher's Conservative Party "purely because she was a woman. I was that naive. Now I'm very left." He also identifies as an atheist.

On the back of the Apple Venus Volume 1 (1999) record sleeve is a version of the Wiccan Rede: "Do what you will but harm none." While stating that he only had "a smattering of knowledge" on Wicca, he described himself as "interested in the pre-Christian appreciation of the land and the spirit of things, spirits in animate things and inanimate things" in a contemporary interview. XTC's 1986 song "Dear God", written by Partridge, was seen as controversial at the time for its anti-religious message; Partridge stated that the song failed to represent his true feelings on religion, as human belief is "such a vast subject". Although an atheist, he believes that heaven and hell exist metaphorically. Another of his songs, "Season Cycle" (1986), included the couplet "Everybody says, Join our religion, get to heaven / I say, no thanks, why bless my soul, I'm already there!" Explaining the lyric "do what you want to do / just don't hurt nobody" from his 1989 song "Garden of Earthly Delights", he said: "I'm sure .. what heaven is, really ... is not hurting anyone."

=== Health ===
Partridge experiences auditory synesthesia, which he uses in his songwriting process. In later interviews, he stated he believes himself to be on the autistic spectrum, saying in a 2022 interview with The Guardian: "I think I'm on the spectrum, yes, but it's all helped me and I wouldn't have it any other way." He has also had obsessive–compulsive disorder since childhood. At the age of 12, he was professionally diagnosed with ADHD (known at the time as simply "hyperactivity") and prescribed Valium. He later formed a dependency on the drug that was exacerbated by the pressures of his music career. After disposing of the drug in 1981, he experienced severe withdrawal effects that led to XTC's withdrawal from touring.

In 1992, Partridge had an ear infection that left him temporarily deaf, and in 2006, during one of the sessions for Monstrance, some of his hearing was destroyed following a studio mishap which caused him to develop severe tinnitus. He later stated that he had "contemplated suicide, just to stop [the tinnitus]."

== Influences ==
As stated by Partridge, artists who have influenced him include:

- Burt Bacharach
- Captain Beefheart
- Alice Cooper
- Ray Davies
- John French
- Johnny and the Hurricanes
- John Lennon
- The Mahavishnu Orchestra
- Paul McCartney
- The Monkees
- New York Dolls
- Charlie Parker, especially "Ornithology" (1946)
- Pink Fairies
- Judee Sill
- The Stooges
- The Tony Williams Lifetime, especially Emergency! (1968)
- Brian Wilson

== Artists influenced ==
Artists who have specifically cited Partridge as an influence include:

- Danny Elfman of Oingo Boingo
- John Frusciante (particularly on the Red Hot Chili Peppers album By the Way)
- Roger Manning of Jellyfish and the Moog Cookbook
- Keiichi Suzuki of Moonriders (particularly on his soundtracks for the video game series Mother)
- Steven Wilson of Porcupine Tree
- Johnny Marr
- David Yazbek
- Nick Heyward of Haircut One Hundred

== Discography ==
Solo

- Fuzzy Warbles Volume 1 (2002)
- Fuzzy Warbles Volume 2 (2002)
- Fuzzy Warbles Volume 3 (2003)
- Fuzzy Warbles Volume 4 (2003)
- Fuzzy Warbles Volume 5 (2004)
- Fuzzy Warbles Volume 6 (2004)
- Fuzzy Warbles Volume 7 (2006)
- Fuzzy Warbles Volume 8 (2006)
- The Official Fuzzy Warbles Collector's Album (2006)
- Hinges (2006)
- Powers (2010) (as A.J. Partridge)
- My Failed Songwriting Career, Volume 1 (2021)
- My Failed Songwriting Career, Volume 2 (2022)
- My Failed Christmas Career, Volume 1 (2022)

Collaborative

- Take Away / The Lure of Salvage (1980) (Mr. Partridge)
- Through the Hill (1993) (Andy Partridge & Harold Budd)
- Orpheus – The Lowdown (2003) (Peter Blegvad & Andy Partridge)
- Monstrance (2007) (Monstrance)
- Fine Wires Humming a New Song EP (2007) (Monstrance)
- Dawn Treader (2007) (Charlotte Hatherley & Andy Partridge)
- Gonwards (2012) (Peter Blegvad & Andy Partridge)
- Planet England (2019) (Robyn Hitchcock & Andy Partridge)
- The 3 Clubmen (2023) (Jen Olive, Stu Rowe & Andy Partridge)
- Queen of Planet Wow! (2024) (Braide Chris & Andy Partridge w/ Tim Weller)

Productions

- Peter Blegvad – The Naked Shakespeare (1983)
- Saeko Suzuki – Studio Romantic (1987)
- The Mission – Grains of Sand (1990)
- The Lilac Time – & Love for All (1990)
- Martin Newell – The Greatest Living Englishman (1993)
- David Yazbek - The Laughing Man (1996) - co-producer
