= XTC: This Is Pop =

- US Showtime poster
- Directed by: Charlie Thomas, Roger Penny
- Produced by: Colin Burrows, Barbara Lee, Andrew Winter
- Edited by: Roger Penny
- Music by: XTC
- Production company: Special Treats Production Company
- Distributed by: Special Treats Distribution
- Release date: 7 October 2017 (Sky Arts)
- Running time: 75 minutes
- Country: United Kingdom

XTC: This Is Pop is a 2017 documentary film directed by Charlie Thomas and Roger Penny about the English rock band XTC. It is focused on the group's musical evolution over the three decades they were active and includes new interviews with XTC guitarist Andy Partridge, bassist Colin Moulding, second guitarist Dave Gregory and drummer Terry Chambers. Archival footage, animations, and specially shot sequences are also featured. The title is derived from the 1978 XTC song "This Is Pop", which Partridge wrote as an attempt to define the band's aesthetic before rock critics could.

== Reception ==
Partridge wanted XTC: This Is Pop to be a biopic with four young Japanese women playing the band, but his ideas were rejected due to budget concerns. At the beginning of the film, he expresses his dislikes of "rockumentaries" and states: "The only thing that's worthy of making a documentary about XTC is it's not about the rock n roll bollocks that constitute 99% of other bands." He was ultimately pleased with the final product, calling it "a gold medal for documentary, and a silver medal for editing," but questioned Moulding's "psychosomatic" characterisation of his 1982 Valium withdrawal period.

Moulding said after the film's premiere on Sky Arts: "I think it was pretty good. I mean, Andy was the central character which I felt was better for the story. The river has other tributaries as well, but I felt it was quite well done. Yeah, I quite liked it." According to Partridge, Gregory was "impressed".

Reviewing the film for Decider, Benjamin Smith described it as an "excellent" documentary in which the members comment little "on their misfortunes, of which there were significantly more than what's covered in the film." Radio Times critic Mark Braxton called it a "vibrant documentary ... exactly the tribute they deserve, filmed against an aptly surreal backdrop mixing model trains with miniature faking."

== Cast ==
XTC

- Andy Partridge
- Colin Moulding
- Terry Chambers
- Dave Gregory

Original band associates

- John Leckie – producer or co-producer on White Music, Go 2, 25 O'Clock and Psonic Psunspot
- Dave Mattacks – drummer on Nonsuch
- Hugh Padgham – engineer on Drums & Wires and Black Sea, co-producer on English Settlement
- Stewart Copeland – toured with the group as a member of the Police in the early 1980s

Other guests

- Steven Wilson (Porcupine Tree)
- Clem Burke (Blondie)
- James Hayward
- Miles Kane (Last Shadow Puppets)
- John Grant (The Czars)
- Sarah Palmer, James Hayward & Laurie Langan (Fassine)
- Harry Shearer (Spinal Tap)

== See also ==
- Great Aspirations – Moulding and Chambers reunion EP that coincided with the film's premiere
