= Take Away / The Lure of Salvage =

- Take Away front cover

Remix album by Mr. Partridge
- Released: February 29, 1980
- Recorded: 1977–1979 (original tracks); 10 October 1979 (overdubs)
- Genre: Dub
- Label: Virgin
- Producer: John Leckie, Andy Partridge

Andy Partridge chronology
Take Away / The Lure of Salvage (1980)	Through the Hill (1994)

Take Away and The Lure of Salvage are sides one and two, respectively, of the debut record by English musician Andy Partridge (credited as "Mr. Partridge"). Co-produced with John Leckie, the LP was released in February 1980 by Virgin Records and consists of dub remixes of tracks originally recorded by Partridge's band XTC.

== Background ==
Each track on Take Away / The Lure of Salvage is derived from a song released on the band's first three albums and related B-sides, except "Commerciality (Signal Ad)", which is a remix of the White Music outtake "Refrigeration Blues". The back cover reads:

This used to be some XTC records. It is now a collection of tracks that have been electronically processed/shattered and layered with other sounds or lyrical pieces. All initial sound by XTC. Additional sound/lyrics by Andy Partridge. Put and take by John Leckie and Andy Partridge on 10/10/79. Alan Jakoby was the tapir. Destructed/constructed at Regents Park Recording Company. If you liked Go+ then this record weighs approximately the same amount.

Partridge recruited Leckie after feeling guilty that the band had not re-hired him to produce their third album, Drums and Wires (1979). The pair worked on the remixes for a week while enjoying and deriving inspiration from late night horror films being shown in London's West End, including Alien (1979). Partridge's wife Marianne was recruited for handclaps and other noises.

Even though no other XTC member was involved in the album's making, Partridge does not personally consider it a solo effort. Virgin rejected his request to issue it under the XTC banner, as it would have counted toward their record contract.

== Artwork ==
The cover pictures on the album's back and front are taken from a post card of Jayne Mansfield in a swimming pool. The figures floating on the water are hot water bottles shaped like her, on the back cover some of which Partridge scribbled out, in order to represent the "holes" in dub music. He made the LP totally royalty-free for a cost of £2000, and asked Virgin to set the price low. Virgin sold the album with the maximum price of £3.99 (equivalent to £22 in 2023).

== Reception ==
Reviews of Take Away / The Lure of Salvage were generally unfavourable. However, in Japan, the record was hailed as a work of "electronic genius" and outsold all other XTC albums. Keiichi Suzuki of Moonriders cited the album as an influence, particularly on the tracks he composed for the Mother video game series.

In 1990, Take Away and The Lure of Salvage were included on the compilation Explode Together: The Dub Experiments 78-80, along with the EP Go+.

== Track listing ==
Track notes adapted from XTC: Song Stories (1998), by XTC and Neville Farmer.

All tracks are written by Andy Partridge, except where otherwise indicated

Side one: Take Away
No.	Title	Writer(s)	Dub mix of	Length
1.	"Commerciality (Signal Ad)"		"Refrigeration Blues"	3:08
2.	"The Day They Pulled the North Pole Down"	Colin Moulding, Andy Partridge	"Heatwave"	3:50
3.	"The Forgotten Language of Light"		"Millions"	4:17
4.	"Steam Fist Futurist"		"Real by Reel"	3:09
5.	"Shore Leave Ornithology (Another 1950)"		"Pulsing Pulsing"	5:32
6.	"Cairo"		"Homo Safari"	1:52

Side two: The Lure of Salvage
No.	Title	Writer(s)	Dub mix of	Length
1.	"The Rotary"		"Helicopter"	3:21
2.	"Madhattan"	Moulding, Partridge	"That Is the Way"	3:17
3.	"I Sit in the Snow"		"Roads Girdle the Globe"	3:12
4.	"Work Away Tokyo Day"	Moulding, Partridge	"Red", "Day In Day Out"	4:05
5.	"New Broom"	Moulding, Partridge	"Making Plans for Nigel"	5:27

== Personnel ==
- Andy Partridge and John Leckie – remixers, producers
- Alan Jakoby – tape operator
