= Charlie Thomas (director) =

British filmmaker, writer and sports presenter

Charlie Thomas is a British filmmaker, writer and former sports presenter who has produced documentaries on rock bands including 10cc, UB40, XTC and the Kinks.

He has ghostwritten the autobiography of pop impresario Harvey Lisberg, I'm into Something Good, which was published in 2023.

== Filmmaking ==
Thomas has produced and directed seven television documentaries, the first of which was the music documentary I'm Not In Love - The Story of 10cc which featured contributions from Sir Tim Rice, Trevor Horn, Stewart Copeland, Graham Nash and Paul Gambaccini, and was broadcast on the BBC, to critical acclaim.

In 2016 he produced and directed Promises and Lies - The Story of UB40, documenting the bitter feud that split the band and the Campbell family, for the BBC, also to favourable reviews.

In 2017 he produced and directed XTC: This Is Pop, which premiered on Sky Arts in the UK and on Showtime in the US. It won the gold award for general documentary at the 2018 Telly Awards in the United States. The same year he produced and directed Fairport Convention - Folk Heroes, featuring contributions from Steve Winwood, Rick Wakeman, Ian Anderson, Maddy Prior and Ralph McTell for Sky Arts.

In 2018, Thomas produced and directed Come Together - The Rise of the Festival for Sky Arts, a documentary examining the evolution of the music festival, from Newport, Monterey Pop, Woodstock and the Isle of Wight in the 60s to modern events such as Glastonbury and Coachella, and featuring interviews with Pete Townshend, Ian Anderson, Nick Mason, Michael Eavis, Michael Lang, Cerys Matthews, Bob Harris, Bob Geldof and Noel Gallagher. And the same year he also directed The Kinks - Echoes of a World, about the making of The Kinks are the Village Green Preservation Society album, which was first broadcast on Sky Arts and featured Ray Davies and Dave Davies, Noel Gallagher, Paul Weller, Suggs, Graham Coxon, Natalie Merchant, Andy Partridge, and Greg Kurstin, with actor Danny Horn portraying a young Ray Davies.

In 2021, he was co-producer on Being James Bond, a profile of Daniel Craig during his time as 007. Featuring Craig in conversation with Bond producers Barbara Broccoli and Michael G Wilson, it was released on Apple TV+ prior to the release of Craig's final Bond movie No Time to Die.

== Sports presenting ==
Prior to becoming a documentary maker, Thomas was a sports presenter for Sky News and Sky Sports. He broadcast live from a variety of events, including the London Olympics in 2012, as well as The Ashes series of 2005, 2009 and 2013. Before that, he was Sky Sports' cricket reporter, covering the domestic game alongside England's series at home and abroad, including Australia (94/5), South Africa (95), Zimbabwe (96) and two in the West Indies (94 and 98). He was also among the first football reporters for Sky Sports in 1992, covering the first season of the Premier League. Before joining Sky he was sports reporter for Capital Radio and IRN, and tennis and rugby union commentator for Screensport, including the 1991 rugby union World Cup. He began his career as a journalist on a provincial newspaper in London.
