= Circu5 =

British progressive rock band

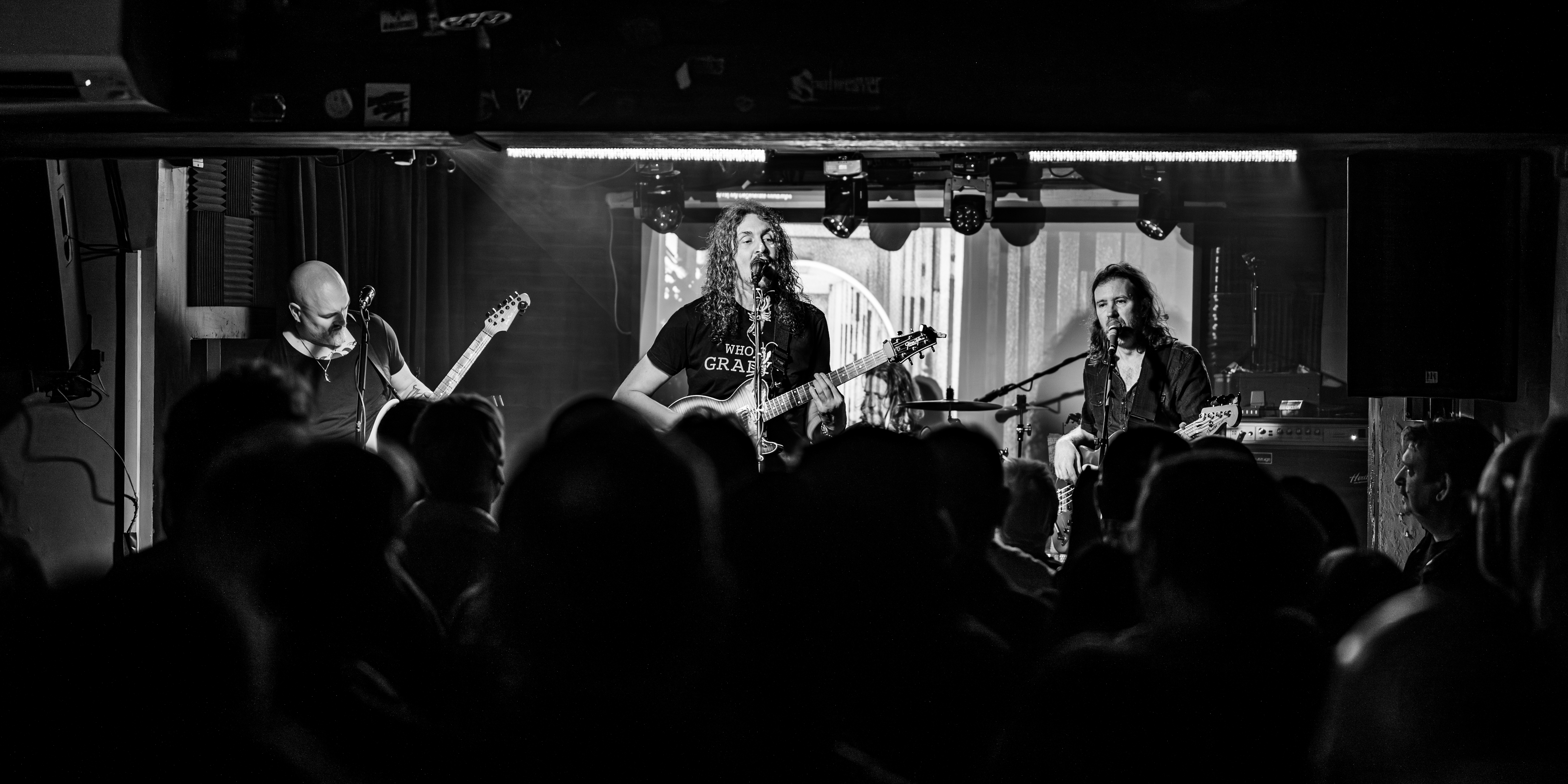
- Circu5 performing at The Victoria, Swindon, 2026

Background information
- Origin: Swindon, Wiltshire, England
- Genres: Progressive rock; art rock; progressive pop
- Years active: 2012-present
- Label: ST Productions
- Members: Steve Tilling; Mark Kilminster; Lee Moulding; Paul New
- Past members: Matt Backer; Paul Clark; Chris O'Leary; Greg Pringle

Circu5 (pronounced "sur-kuh-five" and often typset as CIRCU5) is a British progressive rock band blending contemporary guitar-driven rock with narrative-driven songwriting. The project was created by multi-instrumentalist and songwriter Steve Tilling, initially as a solo concept before evolving into a full band.

== History ==
=== Formation and debut album (2012–2017) ===
Tilling began developing what would become Circu5 in 2012, with the intention of creating music independently and on his own terms. The self-titled debut album was released in 2017. The record featured contributions from several guest musicians, including Dave Gregory of XTC, Big Big Train and Tin Spirits. The debut album introduced Circu5’s central concept: the story of "Grady", a character raised as a psychopath within a covert organisation known as Circu5.

=== Hiatus, transition to full band and second album (2018–2025) ===
In 2018, Tilling joined TC&I, the band of XTC members Colin Moulding and Terry Chambers, in which he met TC&I bandmate and future Circu5 drummer Lee Moulding (Colin’s son). When TC&I disbanded, Tilling became the lead singer and guitarist for EXTC, another XTC-related project featuring Chambers. On leaving EXTC in late 2022, Tilling refocused on Circu5. The band completed their second album, Clockwork Tulpa, which was released in March 2025.

In June 2025, guitarist and vocalist Paul New joined the line-up, making Circu5 a four-piece band consisting of Tilling, New, Mark Kilminster (bass, vocals) and Lee Moulding (drums, vocals).

== Concept ==
Circu5’s music is built around the fictional narrative of "Grady": a child raised to become an ultra-high-functioning psychopath.

The storyline proposes that, in the early 1970s, the UK government established a secret research group, codenamed "CIRCU5", comprising five scientists (a psychologist, neuroscientist, child behaviourist, geneticist, and sociologist). The group aimed to eradicate psychopathy from society, while harnessing its perceived positive traits (such as confidence and decisiveness) to create individuals capable of advancing the UK’s political, corporate and military ambitions.

These efforts involved removing newborns from incarcerated women, then subjecting the children to psychopathy-inducing experiments and, from the age of three, placing them in controlled home environments to reduce negative personality traits (such as impulsivity and irresponsibility).

The name "CIRCU5" references its five scientists, and circus sideshows and freak shows, symbolising the isolation and examination of individuals considered “psychological anomalies”.

Within the narrative, the main character is deemed a failed experiment and assigned the codename “Grady”. The name references real-life sideshow performer and murderer Grady Stiles.

According to Tilling, the narrative serves as a metaphor for themes including overcoming negative past experiences, breaking cycles of abuse, and maintaining critical thinking in the face of cults and conspiratorial belief systems.

== Musical style ==
Circu5’s sound is characterised by guitar-driven rock with progressive rock flourishes, unusual time changes, and layered vocal harmonies. Their work combines narrative storytelling with contemporary rock arrangements.

== Members ==
=== Current members ===
- Steve Tilling – vocals, guitar (2012–present)
- Mark Kilminster – bass, vocals (2018–present)
- Lee Moulding – drums, vocals (2018–present)
- Paul New – guitar, vocals (2025–present)

=== Former members ===
- Matt Backer
- Paul Clark
- Chris O'Leary
- Greg Pringle

== Discography ==
=== Studio albums ===
- Circu5 (2017)
- Clockwork Tulpa (2025)

== Reception ==
Circu5’s self-titled debut album received positive reviews from the rock press. Prog magazine described it as "compelling… tight, dark and intelligent".

The band's second album, Clockwork Tulpa, also received positive reviews. Classic Rock magazine described the album's "melodic magic". Prog magazine stated the album was "a sum-of-its-parts concept record packed to the brim with earworms and technicality."
