= Drums and Wires =

1979 studio album by XTC

Studio album by XTC
- Released: 17 August 1979
- Recorded: 25 June–July 1979
- Studio: The Town House (London)
- Genres: New wave; art pop; art rock
- Length: 46:57
- Label: Virgin
- Producer: Steve Lillywhite

XTC chronology
Go 2 (1978)	Drums and Wires (1979)	Black Sea (1980)

Singles from Drums and Wires
- 1. "Making Plans for Nigel" Released: 14 September 1979; 2. "Ten Feet Tall" Released: 1979 (US)

Drums and Wires is the third studio album by the English rock band XTC, released on 17 August 1979 on Virgin Records. It is a more pop-oriented affair than the band's previous effort, Go 2 (1978), and was named for its emphasis on guitars ("wires") and expansive-sounding drums. The album was their first issued in the United States and their first recorded with guitarist Dave Gregory, who had replaced keyboardist Barry Andrews earlier in 1979. It features a mix of pop, art rock, new wave and punk styles with much rhythmic interplay between XTC's two guitarists.

Bassist Colin Moulding's dissatisfaction with XTC's "quirky" reputation inspired the group to take a more accessible approach, starting with the non-album single "Life Begins at the Hop". Drums and Wires was recorded in four weeks at the newly built Town House studio in London with producer Steve Lillywhite and engineer Hugh Padgham, who were beginning to develop their signature gated reverb production technique, as demonstrated on the album opener and lead single "Making Plans for Nigel". Lyrically, the album focuses on the trappings or titillations of the modern world, with several songs about submitting to external forces. Frontman and guitarist Andy Partridge conceptualised Jill Mumford's cover artwork, which depicts the band logo forming the outline of a face.

Drums and Wires reached number 34 on the UK Albums Chart and number 176 on the US Billboard 200. "Making Plans for Nigel" reached number 17 on the UK Singles Chart and marked the band's commercial breakthrough. In 1980, Partridge recorded Take Away / The Lure of Salvage, an LP consisting mostly of dub remixes of Drums and Wires tracks. In later years, Drums and Wires became the best-known of XTC's albums. In 2004 it was ranked number 38 on Pitchfork's list of "The Top Albums of the 1970s", and in 2019, it was ranked number 31 in a similar list by Paste.

== Background ==
In October 1978, XTC released their second studio album Go 2, a more experimental venture than their debut White Music. It was met with positive reviews and a number 21 chart peak. Keyboardist Barry Andrews left the band in December during their first American tour. Shortly prior, Andrews told journalists that he foresaw the band "explod[ing] pretty soon". Frontman and principal songwriter Andy Partridge commented: "He enjoyed undermining what little authority I had in the band. We were bickering quite a lot. But when he left I thought, Oh shit, that's the sound of the band gone, this space-cream over everything. And I did enjoy his brain power, the verbal and mental fencing." XTC proceeded to run through a "silly half-hearted" process of auditioning another keyboardist. Although Thomas Dolby was rumoured as a replacement, Partridge said that Dolby was never actually considered, but did write many letters asking to join the band.

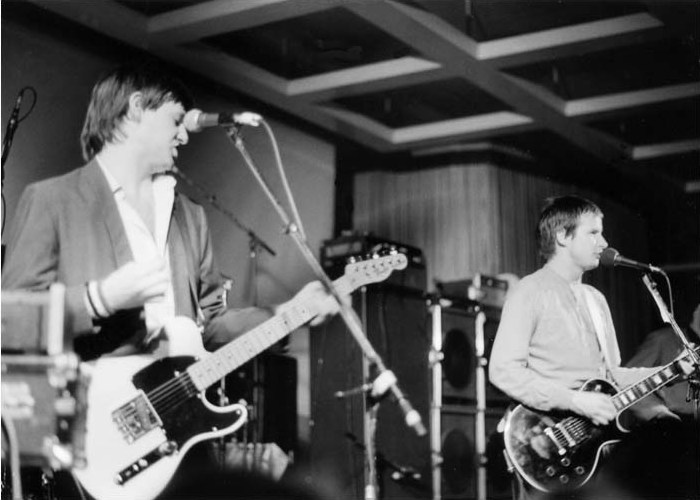
XTC performing in 1980 (pictured from left: Gregory and Partridge)

Rather than hiring a replacement keyboardist, Dave Gregory of the Swindon covers band Dean Gabber and His Gaberdines was invited to join as a second guitarist. Partridge remembered holding a "pretend audition" where Gregory was asked to play the band's "This Is Pop", only for Gregory to inquire whether they wanted the album version or the single version: "We thought, 'Bloody oh, a real musician.' But he was in the band before he even knew." Gregory was anxious of whether the fans would accept him as a member, characterising himself as "the archetypal pub-rocker in jeans and long hair. But the fans weren't bothered. Nobody was fashionable in XTC, ever." He grew more comfortable with the group after playing a few shows, he said, "and things got better and better".

== Production and style ==
Impressed by the work of Steve Lillywhite, XTC contacted him to produce their third album with a drum sound that would "knock your head off". In the 1998 XTC biography Song Stories, Partridge states that the band hired Lillywhite based on his work for Siouxsie and the Banshees' The Scream (1978). Partridge explained in a 1999 interview: "Lillywhite mainly contributed to the drums' sound, very Siouxsie, more voodoo". In 2019, he retracted his claim, saying that the Lillywhite record the band were impressed by was actually Ultravox's 1977 debut. With Virgin staff engineer Hugh Padgham, they embarked to the newly built Townhouse Studios, "with its now world-famous stone room", as described by Gregory, who recalled that Padgham had "yet to develop his trade-mark 'gated ambience' sound". Gregory stated that, ultimately, "most of the ideas were Andy's but we were all contributing and Lillywhite was there as some sort of mediator more than anything. He's credited with producing it but really I think it was about 50/50. Most of the ideas were there in the first place before we got into the studio." Nick Lowe was also considered to produce Drums and Wires. He was contacted but declined the offer, citing scheduling conflicts.

Coinciding with Gregory's arrival, in April 1979, the band recorded "Life Begins at the Hop", written by bassist Colin Moulding, and their first record with Lillywhite producing. After the band went on tour for the single, sessions for Drums and Wires resumed from 25 June to July. By this time, Moulding "wanted to ditch [our] quirky nonsense and do more straight-ahead pop." He said that when Andrews was in the band, Partridge had "no kind of foil" to work with, as he "used to like the real kind of angular, spiky, upward-thrusting guitar ... if one is angular, the other has to kind of straighten him out, you know? It was just going too far the other way, I felt. So when Dave came in, and was a much straighter player, it seemed to make more sense, I think." Partridge opined that, before then, Moulding's songs "came out as weird imitations of what I was doing, 'cause he thought that was the thing to do. ... On Go 2 he was sort of getting his own style, and by Drums and Wires he really started to take off as a songwriter." Gregory remembered that XTC's songs "inspired a different approach to listening and playing from that which I'd grown up with. I simply couldn't continue grinding out old blues clichés and power chords, so I began to think more in terms of the songs as the masters and the instruments as the servants." The album was recorded in three weeks and mixed in two.

Drums and Wires was named for its emphasis on the sounds of guitars and expansive drums. The title was inspired by an illustration from The Beano depicting the comic dog Gnasher playing drums and "BOOM DADA BOOM" written above him. Partridge considered using the illustration for the cover, "but it was a silly idea and 'Drums and Wires' seemed to suit the sound of the record. All drums and guitar strings." Lyrically, the album focuses on the trappings or titillations of the modern world, with several songs about submitting to external forces. Partridge's songs also centre on the impact of technology on human emotions.

Musically, the album was described by Paste critic Lizzie Manno as featuring "a bold, drum-centric", "polychromatic", and "coltish" pop style, with "a skittish punk energy and fierce grooves". She went on to say its "off-kilter fusion of art rock and New Wave swells with Andy Partridge and Colin Moulding's mercurial pop yelps and pointed guitars", and that the addition of Gregory to the band lent the music "space for their transfixing guitar interplay". In the words of Chris Dahlen from Pitchfork, the band pursued "pure pop disguised as jittery post-punk, all played with teeth-chattering intensity", while Milenio writer Ernesto Herrera called the album a representative record of new wave. Editors at Trouser Press opined that it was a "spiky art-pop gem". Writing for Ultimate Classic Rock in 2019, critic Michael Galluci said the album is "45 or so minutes of art-rock" and argued that, "even today, Drums and Wires sounds like an unconventional work among the period's angular, arty and evolving New Wave."

== Songs ==
=== Side one ===
8 of the album's 12 songs were written by Partridge, with the remaining 4 by Moulding. "Making Plans for Nigel" is told from the point of view of parents who are certain that their son Nigel is "happy in his work", affirming that his future in British Steel "is as good as sealed", and that he "likes to speak and loves to be spoken to." The distinctive drum pattern was an attempt to invert drum tones and accents in the style of Devo's 1977 rendition of the Rolling Stones' "Satisfaction". Partridge remembered his discontent with the time devoted to the song's recording, remarking that "[w]e spent a week doing Nigel and three weeks doing the rest of the album." "Helicopter" was inspired by Partridge's childhood memory of a 1960s magazine advertisement for Lego toys.

"When You're Near Me I Have Difficulty" is about Vanessa Kearley, a girl that Partridge was infatuated with during his school years. It was briefly considered as a single, along with "Real by Reel". "Ten Feet Tall" was XTC's first acoustic song, inspired by Nick Lowe's "Cruel to Be Kind". Gregory thought it sounded so unlike the band that he suggested Moulding release it as a solo single.

=== Side two ===
"Real by Reel" is about Partridge's anxieties toward government surveillance. "That Is the Way" is about Moulding's concerns toward how parents relate to their children. Its recording marked the first time XTC hired a session musician, flugelhorn player Dick Cuthell. ”Outside World", a frenetic number built on manic riffing from Gregory and Partridge, and a muscular bass-line by Moulding was considered as a possible single early on during the recording process. In addition to it being a live favorite, it has been described by Partridge as "the last gasp of punky XTC". "Scissor Man" is Partridge's attempt at an adult morality tale, based on "The Story of the Thumb-Sucker" from the German children's book Struwwelpeter, and features a dub-influenced coda.

"Complicated Game", according to Partridge, is "one of those 'you get born and it doesn't matter and then you die' songs". He said that "at that time in my life, I was starting to feel a sense of futility. I think it had to do with being in the band, and being stuck on the touring trail, and seemingly not having any control in my career." The "Tom" and "Joe" in its lyric refer to Tom Robinson and Joe Strummer, names which Partridge found by opening a random page of the NME. Moulding held an electric razor against the microphone to provide the track's continuous buzzing sound. The song ends the LP with a crescendo of guitar sounds. Partridge overdubbed the flange-affected guitar solo without hearing the backing track using two Marshall amplifiers at maximum volume. As with the vocals, it was performed in one take.

== Packaging and leftover tracks ==
Partridge came up with the concept for the album's cover artwork. As he remembers:

... I quite liked the idea of the letters, the X - T and C, and the little underline there actually making the features of [a] face. And I did a rough version, and we were in the studio and I didn't have time to do any finished artwork. And we got together with a girl, I think she was working at Design Clinic [Virgin's art department] at the time, who did a lot of our sleeves. And I ... said, "Okay - here's the sketch. I want it done in real primary colors. And then the back I want done in more muted kind of khakis and browns. But on the front I want really, really bright primaries." And she took away this sketch and I think she just cut it out of colored paper or something, originally. And reproduced this little sketch in terms of just these big bright flashes.

The 'girl' in question was Jill Mumford, who had also designed the cover for Siouxsie and the Banshees' 1978 album The Scream.

An insert was included featuring lyrics to all the songs as well as the songs on XTC's previous albums, Go 2 and White Music. Partridge said this was done due to fans requesting the lyrics of XTC's songs. Early UK copies also included a bonus single: Partridge's "Chain of Command" backed with Moulding's "Limelight". "Chain of Command" is about "wars" among microbes in the human body. It was left off the album due to the band's dissatisfaction with the song. "Limelight", as interpreted by Partridge, is about their perception of how the band was viewed in their hometown of Swindon. The original US version of the album contained a bonus 7" EP featuring these two songs, along with "Day In Day Out," which had been removed from the LP's sequence to make room for "Life Begins at the Hop".

"Life Begins at the Hop" was not included on the original UK LP due to industry convention in the 1960s and the 1970s, although the track appeared on some international variants, either as an addition or substitution. Other tracks were produced but left off the album: Partridge's "Homo Safari", "Pulsing, Pulsing" and "Bushman President". "Homo Safari" is an instrumental piece produced during the "Life Begins at the Hop" session. The "homo" simply refers to the Latin word for man, not a reference to homosexuality. "Pulsing, Pulsing" was recorded with an electric guitar that was not plugged in. "Bushman President" is another instrumental, and the second volume in Partridge's Homo Safari series. It was recorded entirely with a Korg monophonic synthesizer. Later, it was used as an introduction tape for the group's live performances.

== Release ==
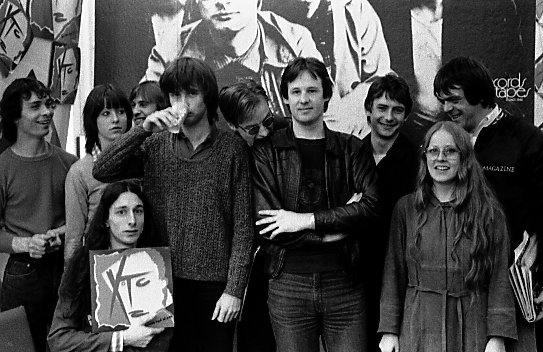
XTC photographed with Canadian fans, 1980. From left: Moulding (holding cup), Partridge (slightly obscured), Gregory, and drummer Terry Chambers.

"Life Begins at the Hop" was released on 4 May 1979 and became the first charting single for the band, rising to number 54 on the UK Singles Chart. They played a 23-date English tour, playing to half- or quarter-full concert halls. In July, music videos directed by Russell Mulcahy were filmed for "Making Plans for Nigel" and "Life Begins at the Hop". From 25 July to 17 August, they embarked on another tour of Australia, which was more successful. Immediately following the tour, the band arrived in Japan and played four dates in Osaka. Partridge recalled the band encountering much fan hysteria in Japan: "We could hardly go anywhere without being screamed at. You'd walk into a hotel lobby and there'd be a crowd of girls sitting around waiting for you."

Drums and Wires was released on 17 August, with lead single "Making Plans for Nigel" following on 5 September. From 11 September to 5 October, XTC embarked on another underwhelming British tour. Gregory remembered: "in Wolverhampton [there were] about 200 people in a place that holds about 1,500. It was really depressing." On 8 October, the band performed four songs from the album for BBC Radio 1's John Peel show. Performances of "Real by Real" and "Ten Feet Tall" recorded were later released for Drums and Wireless: BBC Radio Sessions 77–89 (1994).

"Making Plans for Nigel" later rose to number 17 and helped propel the album to number 37 in the UK. The album became their first to chart in the US, at number 176. Afterwards, the single was playlisted at the BBC, which helped the band secure two appearances on Top of the Pops. When touring resumed on 23 November, every date was sold out. Elsewhere, a union of 100,000 steel workers went on strike and contacted Moulding for a statement on their issues, but he offered no comment. British Steel also gathered four Sheffield employees named Nigel to discuss job satisfaction for the trade publication Steel News.

The LP sold particularly well in Canada, Europe and Australia. In Canada, the record hit number 2 and went gold, selling over 50,000 copies. The band still felt that they were not "fashionable" in England. In their homeland, sales were at a minimal improvement from their previous records. Virgin requested Lillywhite to remix "Real by Reel", "When You're Near Me I Have Difficulty", "Helicopter" and "Outside World" as potential follow-up singles, but the new mixes were rejected by the group. Instead, the band recorded "Wait Till Your Boat Goes Down", a reggae-influenced Partridge song with production by Phil Wainman of Bay City Rollers fame. It was their lowest-selling single to date. They also rerecorded "Ten Feet Tall" to have electric guitar in its arrangement. It was released as their first US single to coincide with their first tour there, which lasted from 14 January to 14 March. Most of the gigs were small club dates, with three East Coast dates supporting the Police, and were not particularly significant. Exceptions included a house record-breaking six consecutive sold-out shows at the Whisky a Go Go in West Hollywood, California. In Canada, XTC played to theatres and universities before larger crowds.

== Critical reception ==
=== Contemporary ===
Contemporary professional ratings
Review scores
Source	Rating
Christgau's Record Guide	A−
Smash Hits	9/10
Sounds	4/5 stars

Drums and Wires received favourable reviews, and according to biographer Chris Twomey, was "widely acknowledged in the music business". NME's Paul Morley decreed that XTC were "doing all sorts of they've never done before and never hinted they would. ... They have moved many steps forward to making a rock classic." In Billboard, the album was deemed "an interesting package from a label that's beginning to make headway in the U.S. It's fresh rock 'n' roll in a new wave vein with a dash of '60s English melody. Of particular note is the inventive mix as instruments sparkle in both left and right channels." The Village Voice critic Robert Christgau wrote: "My reservations about this tuneful but willfully eccentric pop are ideological. ... Partridge and Colin Moulding are moving toward a great art-pop mean that will set standards for the genre. Catchy, funny, interesting—and it rocks."

Rolling Stone's Jon Pareles called the album XTC's "least-dissonant" and identified the band's "current obsession" as "Philip Glass Steve Reich-style static harmony, and their favorite complicated game is to stalemate pop progressions with immobile arrangements." He criticised the group's "Beatles fixation", bemoaning when the band appears "to cop from outside sources", such as the melody of the Beatles' "Please Please Me" in "When You're Near Me I Have Difficulty". Playboy published a single-sentence review: "Devo clones that sound more like the old Maxwell House percolator than like a rock band."

=== Retrospective ===
Retrospective professional ratings
Review scores
Source	Rating
AllMusic	4.5/5 stars
Chicago Tribune	3.5/4 stars
Encyclopedia of Popular Music	4/5 stars
Record Collector	5/5 stars
The Rolling Stone Album Guide	4/5 stars
Spin Alternative Record Guide	8/10

AllMusic reviewer Chris Woodstra reflected that the album signalled "a turning point ... with a more subdued set of songs that reflect an increasing songwriting proficiency. The aimless energy of the first two albums is focused into a cohesive statement with a distinctive voice that retains their clever humor, quirky wordplay, and decidedly British flavor. ... driven by the powerful rhythms and angular, mainly minimalistic arrangements." Greg Kot of the Chicago Tribune cited the album as "among the more accomplished records of its time-edgy, brisk and sarcastic, with pop gems such as 'Making Plans for Nigel' and 'Life Begins at the Hop.'" Ultimate Classic Rock's Michael Galluci said it was XTC's "first great album" and the first in a "string of musically ambitious records".

In 2004, Drums and Wires was ranked number 38 on Pitchfork's list of the 100 best albums of the 1970s. Contributor Chris Dahlen wrote: "Dozens of other contemporary bands were more extreme in every way—angrier, more danceable, more adventurous or primitive or whatever—but this triple-jointed sock hop out-charms them all." In 2016, "Making Plans for Nigel" was ranked number 143 on the website's list of the 200 best songs of the 1970s. In 2019, Drums and Wires was ranked number 31 in a similar list by Paste.

== Legacy ==
Drums and Wires became the best-known album of XTC's discography. Partridge and Moulding reflected on the period as the point in which XTC's "career really started". Gregory did not think he would remain with the band. He remembered: "I don't think I took my role in XTC seriously right up to English Settlement. Drums and Wires was just great fun to me. ... The next thing we knew we were getting four-star reviews in all the papers. How did that happen?" Lillywhite and Padgham returned for the band's follow-up album Black Sea (1980). Only Padgham was recruited for the record after, English Settlement (1982), as Partridge felt "it was Hugh who was getting all the great sounds".

In Moulding's recollection, "Up until that point, we were viewed as a poor man's Talking Heads or something. People called us 'quirky.' But when we came out with Drums and Wires it was like a different band, really. Mainly, that was probably my fault." He was surprised when the label began choosing his songs, instead of Partridge's, as singles. Partridge felt that he was losing the band's leadership and attempted to exert more authority in the group, calling himself "a very benevolent dictator."

In early 1980, Partridge recorded the side LP Take Away / The Lure of Salvage; a one-off record consisting of dub remixes of XTC songs that appeared without much notice, except in Japan, where it was hailed as a work of "electronic genius" and outsold all other XTC albums. The majority of its tracks sampled material from Drums and Wires. In 1982, music journalist Mark Fisher created the XTC fanzine Limelight, named after the B-side single. "Complicated Game" served as the title of a 2016 book by Partridge and journalist Todd Bernhardt, which contains discussions between the two on various XTC songs.

== Track listing ==
=== Original UK release ===
All tracks are written by Andy Partridge, except where noted.

Side one
No.	Title	Writer(s)	Length
1.	"Making Plans for Nigel"	Colin Moulding	4:13
2.	"Helicopter"		3:54
3.	"Day In Day Out"	Moulding	3:08
4.	"When You're Near Me I Have Difficulty"		3:20
5.	"Ten Feet Tall"	Moulding	3:12
6.	"Roads Girdle the Globe"		4:51

Side two
No.	Title	Writer(s)	Length
7.	"Real by Reel"		3:46
8.	"Millions"		5:39
9.	"That Is the Way"	Moulding	2:56
10.	"Outside World"		2:40
11.	"Scissor Man"		3:59
12.	"Complicated Game"		4:53

Bonus single, side one
No.	Title	Length
1.	"Chain of Command"	2:33

Bonus single, side two
No.	Title	Writer(s)	Length
1.	"Limelight"	Moulding	2:26

- Some early vinyl copies erroneously credit Moulding for "Complicated Game".
- At least one pressing, numbered 200.917, has "Life Begins at the Hop" — misspelled as "Life Begins at the Hoo" on the label — in place of "Day In Day Out".

=== Original US release ===
This album had a large number of sequencing variations worldwide in its first few years of release. This is only one of many combinations of tracks.

Side one
No.	Title	Writer(s)	Length
1.	"Life Begins at the Hop"	Colin Moulding	3:49
2.	"Helicopter"		3:54
3.	"Making Plans for Nigel"	Moulding	4:13
4.	"Ten Feet Tall"	Moulding	3:12
5.	"When You're Near Me I Have Difficulty"		3:20
6.	"That Is the Way"	Moulding	2:56

Side two
No.	Title	Length
7.	"Real by Reel"	3:46
8.	"Millions"	5:57
9.	"Outside World"	2:40
10.	"Roads Girdle the Globe"	4:51
11.	"Scissor Man"	3:59
12.	"Complicated Game"	4:53

Bonus single, side one
No.	Title	Writer(s)	Length
1.	"Limelight"	Moulding	2:26

Bonus single, side two
No.	Title	Writer(s)	Length
1.	"Day In Day Out"	Moulding	3:05
2.	"Chain of Command"		2:33

=== 2001 CD bonus tracks ===
These tracks were also included on most 1990's international CD releases of this album, inserted between sides one and two of the UK track listing.

No.	Title	Writer(s)	Length
13.	"Life Begins at the Hop"	Moulding	3:49
14.	"Chain of Command"		2:33
15.	"Limelight"	Moulding	2:26

=== 2014 expanded edition ===
Drums and Wires was reissued on CD and Blu-ray in October 2014, boasting a new stereo and 5.1 surround sound mix of the album from remixer Steven Wilson, as well as new liner notes from Partridge, Moulding and Gregory, alternate mixes and nearly 40 demo and rehearsal tracks. Partridge said of the new mix: "It's so good it's upped my opinion of the album."

CD bonus tracks, remixed by Steven Wilson
No.	Title	Length
13.	"Chain of Command"	2:42
14.	"Limelight"	2:32
15.	"Life Begins at the Hop" (single version)	3:47
16.	"Homo Safari"	2:14
17.	"Ten Feet Tall" (electric version)	3:15
18.	"Wait Till Your Boat Goes Down"	4:42

== Personnel ==
Credits adapted from the album's liner notes, except where noted.

XTC

- Andy Partridge – vocals, guitar, synthesizer, percussion, sleeve design
- Colin Moulding – vocals, bass
- Dave Gregory – guitar, background vocals
- Terry Chambers – drums

Additional personnel

- Andy Partridge, Colin Moulding, Dave Gregory, Terry Chambers, Steve Warren, Hugh Padgham, Al Clark, Laurie Dunn – Vernon Yard Male Voice Choir on "Roads Girdle the Globe"
- Dick Cuthell – flugelhorn on "That Is the Way"
- Steve Lillywhite – production
- Hugh Padgham – engineer
- Georgie Chambers, Steve Prestage, Nick Cook – tape operators
- Jill Mumford – sleeve art

== Charts ==
Chart (1979)	Peak position
Australia (Kent Music Report)	40
Canada RPM Top 50	15
UK Albums Chart	34
US Billboard 200	176

=== Year-end charts ===
Chart (1980)	Position
New Zealand Albums (RMNZ)	41
