= Great Aspirations =

EP by TC&I
- Released: 7 October 2017
- Recorded: 2016
- Studio: Christ Church Bells; Earthworm Amber, Swindon
- Length: 15:19
- Label: PledgeMusic
- Producer: TC&I

TC&I chronology
Great Aspirations (2017)	Naked Flames (2019)

Great Aspirations is the debut record by English duo TC&I (bassist Colin Moulding and drummer Terry Chambers, both formerly of the band XTC). The EP was released on 7 October 2017.

== Background ==
The record marked the first recordings made by Terry Chambers since 1984 when, after leaving XTC, he relocated to Australia and joined the band Dragon, touring with them from 1983 to 1984 and recording an album. With the exception of guest appearances as a session vocalist, bass player, and collaborator on several albums, the EP also marked Colin Moulding's first recordings since XTC's disbandment in 2006.

The project came about when Chambers returned from Australia and Moulding suggested the two record an EP together. When Chambers expressed uncertainty, Moulding proposed they do a few live performances as well, as he knew Chambers enjoyed performing. The EP was recorded in Moulding's home, primarily in his garage.

== Release ==
Dave Franklin of the Swindon Advertiser reviewed the EP as "something tasteful, deftly wrought, restrained and wonderfully English, West Country.... Swindonian even, if you are close enough to get the references."

XTC co-founder Andy Partridge praised "Scatter Me" and "Kenny" as his favourite cuts on the record, and wished "Colin (and Terry) all the best in the world."

== Promotion ==
TC&I played six sold-out shows at Swindon Arts Centre in October and November 2018, their first live performances together in 35 years. A subsequent live recording of the sixth and last show, Naked Flames, was released on 9 August 2019. It was the only night in which the recording was not plagued by technical issues. Some songs they performed were omitted from the album due to Moulding's dissatisfaction with the band's playing.

== Dissolution ==
In January 2019, TC&I announced that they had disbanded. Moulding stated that he was not interested in pursuing a tour, as the performances were simply to satisfy "a curiosity", but said that Chambers might continue playing gigs. In 2021, Moulding stated that the project came to an end because he did not enjoy playing live and did not wish to venture past the few performances he'd done with Chambers, largely because it would entail spending time away from his family.

== Track listing ==
All songs written by Colin Moulding.

1. "Scatter Me" – 4:32
2. "Greatness (The Aspiration Song) – 3:53
3. "Kenny" – 4:33
4. "Comrades of Pop" – 2:23

== Personnel ==
TC&I

- Terry Chambers – drums, percussion, backing vocals
- Colin Moulding – guitars, basses, keyboards, lead vocals

Additional musicians

- Alan Bateman – saxophone and trumpet on "Kenny" and "Scatter Me"
- Susannah Bevington – soprano voice on "Scatter Me"
- Mikey Rowe – Farfisa organ and "ornate tinkling" on "Scatter Me"

Technical

- TC&I – producers, engineers, design concept
- Stuart Rowe – mixing
- John Bucket – engineer
- Pete Hewington – assistant engineer
- Jason Mitchell – mastering
- Geoff Winn – photography
- Andrew Swainson – design
