= XTC =

English rock band (1972–2006)

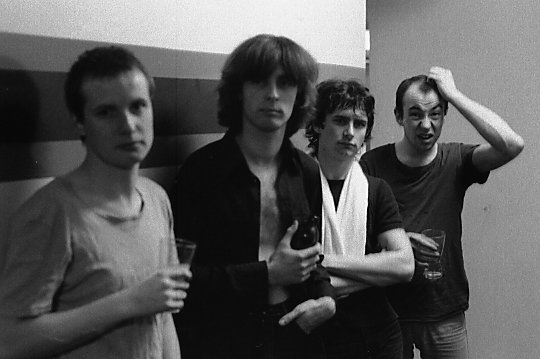
- XTC backstage in Toronto, Canada in October 1978, from left: Andy Partridge, Colin Moulding, Terry Chambers and Barry Andrews

Background information
- Also known as: Star Park (1972–1974); The Helium Kidz (1974–1975)
- Origin: Swindon, Wiltshire, England
- Genres: Pop; art rock; new wave; post-punk; art punk; progressive pop
- Works: Discography
- Years active: 1972–2006
- Labels: Virgin; Cooking Vinyl; Idea
- Spinoffs: The Dukes of Stratosphear; TC&I
- Past members: Andy Partridge; Colin Moulding; Terry Chambers; Barry Andrews; Dave Gregory; See members section for others
- Website: ape.uk.net

XTC were an English rock band formed in Swindon in 1972. Fronted by songwriters Andy Partridge (vocals, guitars) and Colin Moulding (vocals, bass), the band gained popularity during the rise of punk and new wave in the 1970s, later playing in a variety of styles that ranged from angular guitar riffs to elaborately arranged pop. Partly because the group did not fit into contemporary trends, they achieved only sporadic commercial success in the UK and US, but attracted a considerable cult following. They have since been recognised for their influence on Britpop and later power pop acts.

Partridge and Moulding first met in the early 1970s and subsequently formed a glam outfit with drummer Terry Chambers. The band's name and line-up changed frequently, and it was not until 1975 that the band was known as XTC. In 1977, the group debuted on Virgin Records and were subsequently noted for their energetic live performances and their refusal to play conventional punk rock, instead synthesizing influences from ska, 1960s pop, dub music and avant-garde. The single "Making Plans for Nigel" (1979) showed them using innovative production techniques and marked their commercial breakthrough.

Between 1979 and 1992, XTC had a total of 10 albums and 6 singles that reached the UK top 40, including "Sgt. Rock (Is Going to Help Me)" (1980) and "Senses Working Overtime" (1982). After 1982's English Settlement, the band stopped concert touring and became a studio-based project centred on Partridge, Moulding and guitarist Dave Gregory. A spin-off group, the Dukes of Stratosphear, was invented as a one-off excursion into 1960s-style psychedelia, but as XTC's music evolved, the distinctions between the two bands lessened. XTC continued to produce more progressive records, including the albums Skylarking (1986), Oranges & Lemons (1989) and Nonsuch (1992). In the US, "Mayor of Simpleton" (1989) was their highest-charting single, while "Dear God" (1986) was controversial for its anti-religious message.

Due to poor management, XTC never received a share of profits from record sales (of which there were millions), nor from touring revenue, forcing them into debt throughout the 1980s and 1990s. In 1993, they went on strike against Virgin, citing an unfair recording contract, and soon extricated themselves from the label. Gregory left the band during the making of Apple Venus Volume 1 (1999), after which the XTC name was used by the duo of Partridge and Moulding. In 2006, Partridge announced that his creative partnership with Moulding had disintegrated, leaving XTC "in the past tense". Moulding and Chambers briefly reunited as the duo TC&I in the late 2010s. Partridge and Gregory remain musically active.

== 1972–1982: early years and touring ==
=== Formation ===
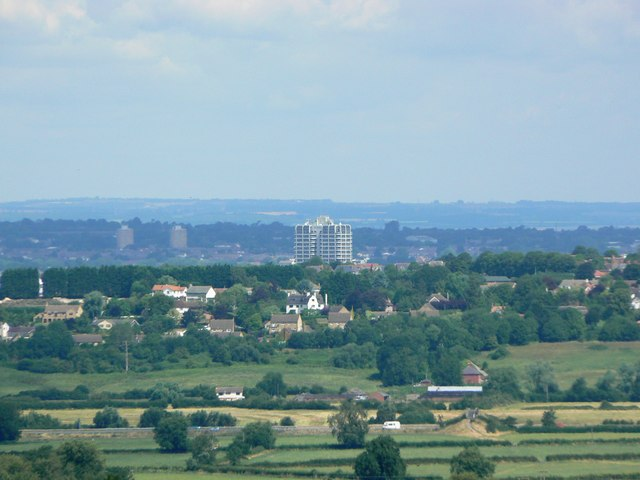
A view of Swindon in 2007

Andy Partridge and Colin Moulding grew up on Penhill council estate in Swindon. Partridge jokingly characterised the community as being populated almost entirely by people with physical, mental or emotional defects. In the 1960s, he was a fan of contemporary pop groups like the Beatles, but was intimidated by the process of learning guitar. When the Monkees grew popular, he became interested in joining a music group. He recalled watching local guitarist Dave Gregory performing Jimi Hendrix-style songs at churches and youth clubs: "Sort of acid-skiffle. I thought, 'Ah, one day I'll play guitar!' But I didn't think I would be in the same band as this kid on the stage." Partridge eventually obtained a guitar and taught himself how to play it with no formal training. At the age of 15, he wrote his first song, titled "Please Help Me", and attracted the nickname "Rocky" for his early guitar mastery of the Beatles' "Rocky Raccoon" (1968). By the early 1970s, his music tastes had transitioned "from the Monkees to having a big binge on this Euro-avant-garde stuff. I got really in deep." One of his first bands was called "Stiff Beach", formed in August 1970. In early 1972, Partridge's constantly evolving group settled into "Star Park", a four-piece that featured himself with guitarist Dave Cartner, drummer Paul Wilson, and a bassist nicknamed "Nervous Steve".

In 1972, Partridge became closer acquainted with Gregory, a diabetic then suffering from a bout of depression, while working as an assistant at the Bon Marche record shop in Swindon. Gregory was playing the Mahavishnu Orchestra's album The Inner Mounting Flame (1971), which he later called "one of the watershed moments in my musical education." Partridge met Colin Moulding at the Stage Bar on Swindon's Old Town's Union Row, later known as Long's. Moulding had been playing bass since 1970 "because I liked music [and] I thought that playing a bass, with four strings, would be infinitely easier than playing a guitar, with six strings. That was a horrible misconception!" At the end of 1972, Moulding and drummer Terry Chambers joined Partridge's band, replacing Nervous Steve and Paul Wilson, and the group was renamed "Star Park (Mark II)". Other members would frequently join and leave the group.

=== Local popularity, rise of punk and label signing ===
After Star Park opened for Thin Lizzy in May 1973, the band renamed themselves the Helium Kidz. Partridge's musical conceptions were "blown away" upon hearing the New York Dolls: "I suddenly just wanted to play three chords again and get out my mum's makeup and stuff." He subsequently wrote hundreds of songs for the Helium Kidz, and some demo tapes were sent to Decca Records. NME ran a small profile on the "up and coming" band, which consisted of Partridge, Moulding, Chambers and guitarist Dave Cartner: "They aspire to attain the impossible dream of being able to throw a TV or two out of the window of an American hotel and have no one complain." This version of the group lasted until 1975, when the Helium Kidz decided to rebrand themselves and change their music to "three-minute pop songs that were fast and inventive." Gregory auditioned for the band at this juncture, but did not end up joining. His musicianship was determined to be "too good".

It was decided that the band have another name change. "The Dukes of Stratosphear" was considered, but Partridge thought it was too "flowery" and "psychedelic". He derived "XTC" from Jimmy Durante's exclamation upon discovering the lost chord: "That's it! I'm in ecstasy!" The name was chosen mainly for its emphatic appearance in print. Meanwhile, owing to creative differences with Partridge, synthesizer player Jonathan Perkins quit the band. In search of his replacement, Partridge found Barry Andrews through a "keyboard player seeks band" advertisement. Instead of a formal audition, the two went out drinking together. Andrews was immediately hired. During the first band rehearsal, Partridge recalled, "He sounded like Jon Lord from Deep Purple; fuzz box, wah wah pedal, bluesy runs. I said, You don't have to play like that, you can play like us if you want. The next rehearsal, he was like a maniac, like if Miró had played electric organ. Fantastic." December 1976 officially marked the beginning of the Partridge–Moulding–Chambers–Andrews line-up. The members cut their long hair and, for a time, wore "kung-fu mechanic" outfits on stage.

I really didn't like the phrase 'punk'—it just seemed kind of demeaning. I didn't like 'new wave' either, because that was already the phrase used for French cinema of a certain period. ... [Our music was] blatantly just pop music. We were a new pop group. That's all.

— Andy Partridge elaborating on XTC's song "This Is Pop", 2007

Ian Reid, owner of a Swindon club named The Affair, was their third manager and brokered deals for the group to perform at more popular venues such as the Red Cow in Hammersmith, The Nashville Rooms and Islington's Hope and Anchor. By this time, the punk rock movement had emerged, which opened an avenue for the group in terms of record label appeal, even though the band did not necessarily fit in the punk dogma. Partridge remembered hearing the Sex Pistols' "Anarchy in the U.K." (1976) and feeling underwhelmed by its similarity to the Monkees or the Ramones: "That sort of spurred me on – watching this stuff that I thought was rather average." Soon, John Peel saw the band perform at Upstairs at Ronnie Scott's and asked them to appear on his BBC Radio 1 block. Partridge credited him as "responsible for us getting a recording contract. ... As soon as we recorded that session for the BBC, suddenly three or four record labels wanted to sign us up." After declining CBS, Harvest and Island, they signed with Virgin Records.

=== White Music and Go 2 ===
In August 1977, XTC made their first commercially released studio recordings with producer John Leckie at Abbey Road, which appeared on their debut release 3D EP in October. Their first full-length record, White Music, was then recorded in less than two weeks, and released for January 1978. Partridge characterized the album as "Captain Beefheart meets the Archies" shrouded in 1950s-style retrofuturism. He reflected that the album was the sum of everything the band enjoyed, including the Beatles, Sun Ra, and Atomic Rooster, but dismissed the contents as premature songs "built around this electric wordplay stuff". White Music reached number 38 on the UK Albums Chart. Although the album was well received by the press (Melody Maker, NME, Sounds, and Record Mirror all gave positive reviews), none of its singles managed to chart. They rerecorded "This Is Pop" as a lead single. Its follow-up, "Statue of Liberty", was banned on BBC Radio due to the lyric "I sail beneath her skirt". With each member placed on a £25 weekly salary, the band toured for the next five years. The group also made appearances on the children's television shows Tiswas and Magpie, which meant they would occasionally play for under-16 crowds on these early tours. Partridge enjoyed these early shows, but would later resent touring as the band's audience numbers grew and the performing experience became more impersonal.

By August 1978, XTC were prepared to record their next album. The band had contacted Brian Eno to produce after they learned that he was a fan, but he declined, telling them that they were good enough to produce themselves. Virgin rejected Eno's advice, and the group instead returned to Abbey Road with Leckie. Andrews appeared at the sessions with several original songs, but Partridge did not feel they were right for the band. He began taking Moulding and Chambers out for drinks without inviting Partridge, allegedly in an attempt to take over the group. After most of Andrews' songs were dropped from the final track list, the keyboardist told journalists that he foresaw the band "explod[ing] pretty soon". Go 2, a more experimental venture, was released in October to positive reviews and a number 21 chart peak. Like White Music, it was given praise in Sounds, Melody Maker, and the NME. One of the tracks, "Battery Brides (Andy Paints Brian)", was written in tribute to Eno. The album also included a bonus EP, Go+, which consisted of five dub remixes of XTC songs.

Andrews left the band in December 1978, while they were on their first American tour, and went on to form the League of Gentlemen with Robert Fripp of King Crimson. Partridge said: "He enjoyed undermining what little authority I had in the band. We were bickering quite a lot. But when he left I thought, Oh shit, that's the sound of the band gone, this space-cream over everything. And I did enjoy his brain power, the verbal and mental fencing." XTC went through a "silly half-hearted" process of auditioning another keyboardist. Although Thomas Dolby was rumoured as a replacement, Partridge said that Dolby was never actually considered.

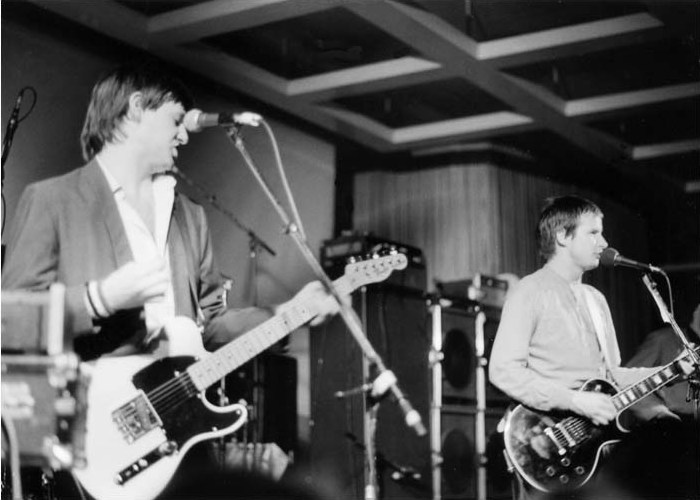
XTC performing live (pictured from left: Gregory and Partridge)

Rather than hiring a replacement keyboardist, Dave Gregory of the covers band Dean Gabber and His Gaberdines was invited to join as a second guitarist. Partridge remembered holding a "pretend audition" where Gregory was asked to play "This Is Pop", only for Gregory to inquire whether they wanted the album version or the single version: "We thought, 'Bloody oh, a real musician.' But he was in the band before he even knew." Gregory was anxious of whether the fans would accept him as a member, characterizing himself as "the archetypal pub-rocker in jeans and long hair. But the fans weren't bothered. Nobody was fashionable in XTC, ever." He grew more comfortable with the group after playing a few shows, he said, "and things got better and better".

=== Drums and Wires and Black Sea ===
XTC were impressed by producer Steve Lillywhite's work on Ultravox's 1977 debut, and Siouxsie and the Banshees' The Scream, and he was contacted to produce their third album with a drum sound that would "knock your head off". With engineer Hugh Padgham, the band embarked to the newly built Townhouse Studios. Coinciding with Gregory's arrival, the band recorded "Life Begins at the Hop" (1979), a Moulding composition. By this time, Moulding "wanted to ditch [our] quirky nonsense and do more straight-ahead pop." He was surprised to learn that the label chose his song as a single over Partridge's. Upon release, it was the first charting single for the band, rising to number 54 on the UK Singles Chart. For a period, most of the group's singles were not placed on their albums. Moulding explained that this was because of an industry convention in the 1960s and the 1970s, and that when "we wanted to shift albums later on, that approach got blown out of the water."

"Making Plans for Nigel" (1979)
In 2016, "Making Plans for Nigel" was ranked number 143 on Pitchfork's list of the 200 best songs of the 1970s, where it was described as "more tender and complex than a straightforward anti-establishment tirade."

Drums and Wires, released in August 1979, was named for its emphasis on guitars and expansive drums. AllMusic reviewer Chris Woodstra wrote that it signalled "a turning point ... with a more subdued set of songs that reflect an increasing songwriting proficiency. The aimless energy of the first two albums is focused into a cohesive statement with a distinctive voice that retains their clever humor, quirky wordplay, and decidedly British flavor. ... driven by the powerful rhythms and angular, mainly minimalistic arrangements." The distinctive drum pattern of its lead single, Moulding's "Making Plans for Nigel", was an attempt to invert drum tones and accents in the style of Devo's cover of the Rolling Stones' "Satisfaction". The song became a number 17 hit and helped propel the album to number 37 in the UK. Before "Nigel", XTC had struggled to fill more than half the seats of the small club circuits they played. Afterward, the single was playlisted at the BBC, which helped the band secure two appearances on Top of the Pops. When touring resumed in November, every date was sold out. In later years, the album became the best-known of XTC's discography and Moulding and Partridge would look back on this point as the symbolic start of the band's career.

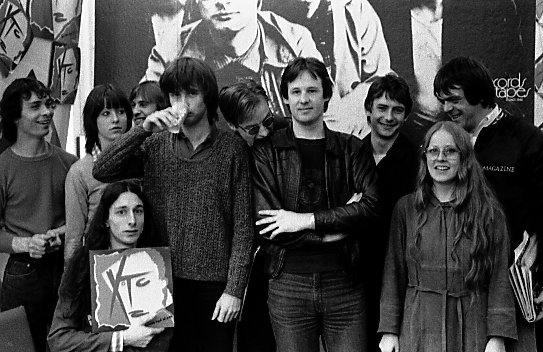
XTC photographed with Canadian fans, 1980. From left: Moulding (holding cup), Partridge (in the background, wearing glasses), Gregory, and Chambers.

To follow up "Nigel", the band released "Wait Till Your Boat Goes Down" (1980), a reggae-influenced Partridge song with production by Phil Wainman of Bay City Rollers fame. It was their lowest-selling single to date. Concurrently, Virgin issued Moulding's "Ten Feet Tall" as the band's first US single. According to Gregory, "Colin began to fancy himself as the 'writer of the singles'". In response to "the fuss made over Colin's songs", Partridge attempted to exert more authority in the group: "I thought I was a very benevolent dictator." Gregory disagreed, recalling that the band was "pretty tired" and that Partridge "could be a little bit of a bully". Partridge at this point released a side project with Take Away / The Lure of Salvage in early 1980; a one-off record that appeared without much notice, except in Japan, where it was hailed as a work of "electronic genius" and outsold all other XTC albums. (Note: Although it was credited to "Mr Partridge", he does not personally consider it a solo album. Virgin rejected his request to issue it as XTC as it would have counted toward their record contract.)

Black Sea, released in September 1980, reunited the group with Lillywhite and Padgham and was well-received critically. Singles "Generals and Majors", "Towers of London" and "Sgt. Rock (Is Going to Help Me)" returned them to the charts at numbers 32, 31 and 16, respectively. "Sgt. Rock" provoked feminist hate-mail for the lyric "keep her stood in line". Partridge regretted the song, calling it "crass but not enjoyably crass". "Respectable Street" was banned from BBC radio due to its references to abortion and a "Sony Entertainment Centre". Partridge believed Black Sea was the closest the group had come to representing their live sound in the studio. It remains XTC's second-highest charting British album, placing at number 16, and the most successful album in the U.S. of their career, peaking at number 41 on the Billboard 200. That October, the documentary XTC at the Manor, which featured the band faking a studio session for "Towers of London", was broadcast on BBC2.

=== English Settlement and Partridge's breakdown ===
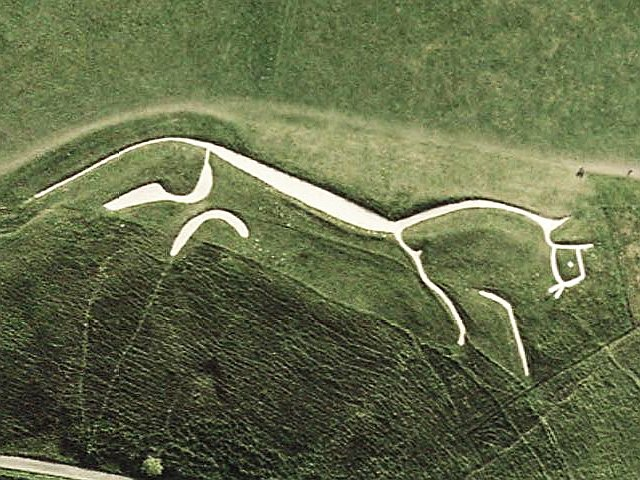
The Uffington White Horse served as the inspiration for English Settlement's cover artwork. Partridge "wanted to move in a more pastoral, more acoustic direction."

From 1980 to 1981, XTC toured Australia, New Zealand, Canada and the US in support of Black Sea as the opening act for the Police. At this point, they were playing in arena stadiums while Partridge's mental state was beginning to deteriorate, and he requested to cease touring, but was opposed by Virgin, his bandmates, and the band's management. He would occasionally experience moments of memory lapse to the extent that he would forget who he was. His then-wife Marianne blamed his illness on his longtime dependency on Valium, which he had been prescribed since the age of 12. She threw away the tablets, and over the next year, he experienced intense withdrawal effects that he later described as "brain melt".

XTC became their own producers for their next album project. Until this point, Partridge had insisted that every part of the band's arrangements on record could be replicated live. He believed that "if I wrote an album with a sound less geared towards touring then maybe there would be less pressure to tour." As such, the new music showcased more complex and intricate arrangements, song lengths were longer, and subject matter covered broader social issues. Much of the new material also featured acoustic instruments. Gregory bought a Rickenbacker 12-string and began contributing to the records as a keyboardist. In February 1982, English Settlement was released as the group's first double album. The hook of its lead single, "Senses Working Overtime", was based on Manfred Mann's "5-4-3-2-1" (1964), Both the album and single became the highest-charting records they would ever have in the UK, peaking at number five and number 10, respectively. In several territories outside the UK, the album was released as only a single LP.

The group scheduled television appearances and an international tour in support of English Settlement. During a live-broadcast gig in Paris on 18 March, Partridge stopped playing and ran off the stage during the opening song 'Respectable Street', and afterward, took a flight back to Swindon for treatment, which amounted to hypnotherapy. He described feeling nausea and stomach pains while on stage: "My body and brain said, You're hating this experience I'm going to make it bad for you. When you go on stage I'm going to give you panic attacks and stomach cramps. You're not enjoying this and you haven't got the heart to tell anyone you can't carry on so I'm gonna mess you up." The band's remaining tour dates in England were cancelled. After recovering from the episode, Partridge rejoined the group for their first tour of the US as a headlining act. The band played the first date in San Diego. Gregory said that they were "totally unrehearsed" during the performance because "we'd not played together for two weeks. ... It was obvious that he was ill, but exactly what it was, no-one knew."

On 4 April 1982, XTC were scheduled to headline a sold-out show at the Hollywood Palladium in Los Angeles. Partridge woke up that morning, he said, and "couldn't get off the bed. My legs wouldn't function. Walked to Ben Frank's coffee shop, where we'd all agreed to meet, in slow motion like I had both legs in plaster, trying not to throw up. I got in there, they knew what I was going to say." The tour ceased. He continued his hypnotherapy treatment, fearing that he was turning into the archetypal rock burn-out (such as Syd Barrett). "It got to the point where if I touched the front door knob, I wanted to throw up." For a period afterward, it was rumoured among fans and industry insiders that the group stopped performing because Partridge had died, and some American bands put on XTC tribute shows in his remembrance.

== 1982–1992: studio years ==
=== Financial issues and start of managerial litigation ===
[Because of our] bad record deal and a corrupt manager, life was a bit of a nightmare ... When I said we don't want to play live anymore, they [Virgin] completely stopped [promoting us] ... We ran on negative equity for 20 years.

— Andy Partridge, 2000

The cancelled American tour saddled XTC with a £20,000 debt, and since it left them unable to record new material, they decided to reexamine their financial affairs. Confused as to where their earnings had gone, the group requested that manager Ian Reid help pay for the debts, but he refused, saying that they had owed him money. They tried distancing themselves from Reid by renegotiating their contract with Virgin. Six more albums were promised to the label in exchange for covering their debts, as well as a guarantee that subsequent royalty and advancement cheques be redirected into the band's own deposit account. Royalty rates were still kept relatively low, as the group's A&R man Paul Kinder explained, they had "appalling management for a number of years. Usually if a manager has got any kind of business acumen he will renegotiate the contract to get a better royalty. A record company expects this, which is why they keep royalties low initially. It's just business really. Nobody addressed the contract for XTC."

Reid remained XTC's manager until January 1983 (according to the book Chalkhills and Children) or a couple years afterward (according to Partridge). He legally retained the title of XTC's manager until near the end of the decade. In April 1984, the group learned that he had incurred them an outstanding value-added taxes [VAT] bill and that he had significantly mishandled their revenue stream. A lawsuit was filed by the band, while he counter-sued for "unpaid commission on royalties". Virgin were then "legally required to freeze royalty and advance payments and divert publishing income into a frozen deposit account." For the next decade, the entirety of the band's earnings would be invested in the continued litigation. The group supported themselves mostly through short-term loans from Virgin and royalty payments derived from airplay. At one point, Moulding and Gregory were working at a car rental service for additional income. Partridge was eventually left with "about £300 in the bank", he said, "which is really heavy when you've got a family and everyone thinks you're 'Mr Rich and Famous'." A court-enforced gag order restricts the band from speaking publicly on the alleged improprieties. According to Partridge, Reid was "very naughty" and left the band with roughly £300,000 in unpaid VAT. Music journalist Patrick Schabe elaborates:

... what is known is that [Reid] signed a deal with Virgin that wound up working out primarily for Reid, secondarily for Virgin, and not at all for XTC. Throughout their first five years of existence, XTC never saw a penny of profits from either album sales or touring revenue. Reid, on the other hand, took out large loans from Virgin, borrowing against XTC's royalties, to the tune of millions of pounds by some estimates. Even after the band settled out of court with Reid, because of the terms of the contract, Virgin was able to hold XTC liable for the sum. Because of XTC's failure to tour, the likelihood of ever repaying Virgin dwindled further and further away. Over the course of a 20-year contract with Virgin Records, and after achieving gold and platinum status in album sales on a number of discs, XTC never saw any publishing royalties.

=== Mummer and faltered popularity ===
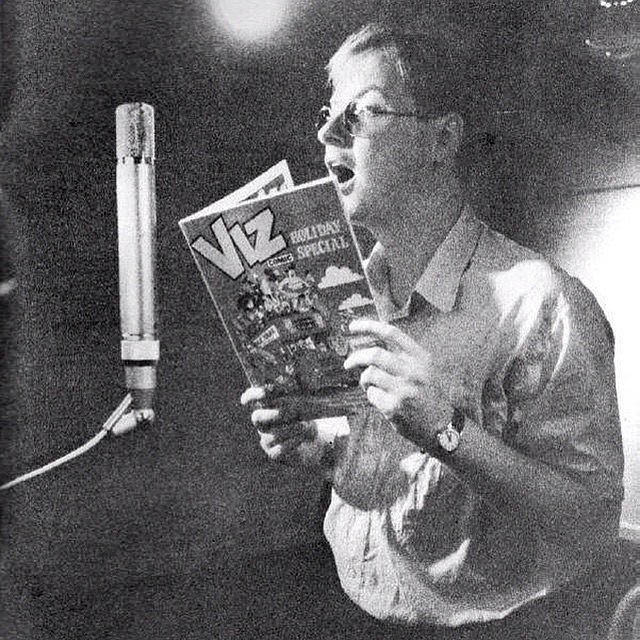
Partridge in the studio, 1988. His refusal to tour caused long-standing tensions with the label.

During the middle months of 1982, Partridge spent his time in convalescence and writing songs. He later surmised that relinquishing Valium inadvertently gave him a new sense of creative direction: "I was thinking clearer and wanted to know stuff. Life's big questions." In the interim, Chambers moved to Australia and started a family. Feeling dismayed by Partridge's decision not to tour, he had to be persuaded to return to Swindon for the next album's rehearsals in September. At one rehearsal, Partridge recalled asking Chambers for "tiny, cyclical, nattering clay pots", which he replied sounded "a bit fucking nancified". The newly-wed Chambers soon left the band to be with his wife in Australia.

Drummer Pete Phipps, formerly of the Glitter Band, was quickly hired as a session musician to continue the recording sessions—XTC would never again employ a permanent drummer after Chambers' departure. In the meantime, Virgin released a greatest hits compilation, Waxworks: Some Singles 1977–1982, to underwhelming sales. The group's new material was rejected by Virgin executive Jeremy Lascelles, who suggested that they write something more commercial. Partridge remembered, "He asked me to write something a bit more like The Police, with more international flavour, more basic appeal." Lascelles said that he had actually named Talking Heads, not the Police: "Andy likes to portray us as the strict, stern schoolmasters, but we never wanted him to compromise at anything we thought he was good at. Here were very talented songwriters – surely, surely, surely they can come up with that elusive thing that is a hit single. That was our psyche."

After some remixing and additional songs at Virgin's behest, Mummer, the first product of the studio-bound XTC, appeared in August 1983. Virgin did little to promote the album and delayed its release by several months. At number 58, it was their lowest-charting album to date. The one single that did chart, "Love on a Farmboy's Wages", did find significant airplay on BBC Radio 1. It was the first of a handful of XTC songs written over the years that reflected their poor financial state.

Virtually every contemporary review of Mummer accused the band of falling out of touch with the contemporary music climate. Journalist Serene Dominic retrospectively wrote that the album was seen as "something of a disappointment at the time of release ... [It was] devoid of silly songs like 'Sgt. Rock' that had heretofore been the band's stock-in-trade and didn't rock out until the last song, 'Funk Pop a Roll.' ... Mummer signaled a strange rebirth for XTC." Moulding thought that "when we came back from America after our aborted tour of 1982 ... people like Spandau Ballet had moved onto the scene; new groups were coming up and there was no place for us." (Note: When asked for a favourite song by Spandau Ballet, Partridge responded: "I used to see them on TV and I wanted to kick in the set. How dare the TV force such crap on me?! They had appalling lyrics! Appalling music! Least favorite band in the history of foreverness! They were a bunch of bankers, for God's sake!") Mojo journalist Chris Ingham summed up the period: "In 18 months, XTC had gone from Top 10 hits and critical superlatives to being ignorable, arcane eccentrics. Partridge later said "Your average English person probably thinks we split up in 1982".

=== The Big Express and 25 O'Clock ===
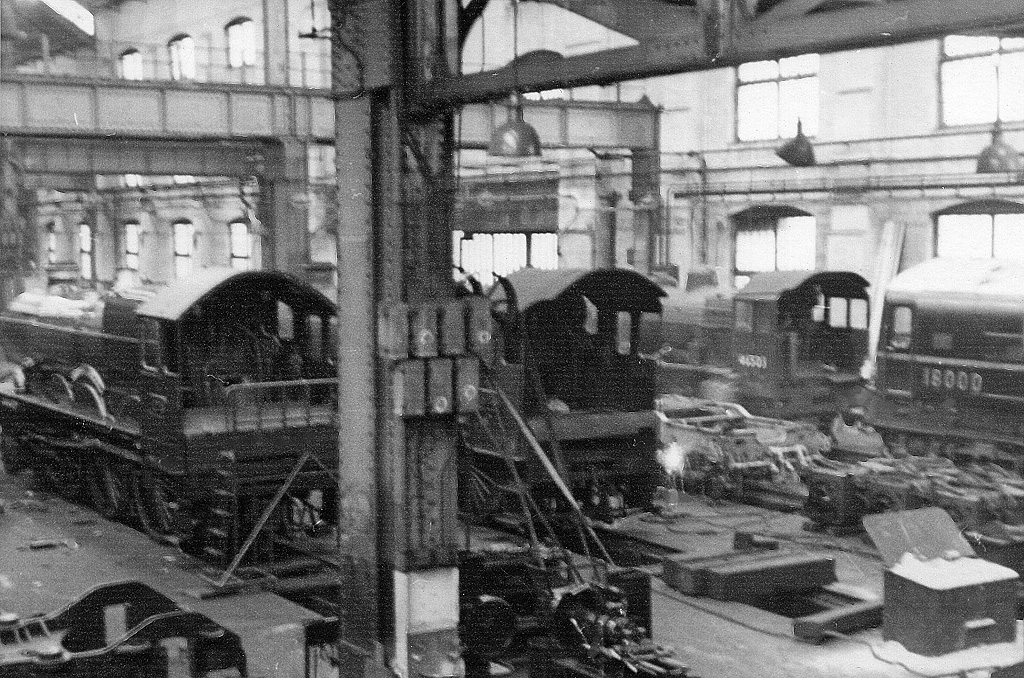
The impending closure of the Swindon Works formed a backdrop to The Big Express.

XTC released the 1983 holiday single "Thanks for Christmas" under the pseudonym Three Wise Men. It was produced by David Lord, owner of Crescent Studios in Bath, and they subsequently negotiated a deal that allowed them to work as much as they wanted on their next album at his studio. Some of the album was recorded using a Linn LM-1 Drum Computer, and extensive time was spent on its programming. Partridge envisioned the work as "industrial pop" inspired by Swindon, a "railway town". The result, The Big Express, returned the group to a brighter and uptempo sound marked by studio experimentation and denser arrangements, setting a template that they would develop on subsequent albums. He jokingly referred to some parts of the album as the only time the group were befallen with stereotypical 1980s-style production. It was released in October 1984, reaching a higher chart position than Mummer, but was "virtually ignored" by critics. Virgin invested £33,000 into the music video for "All You Pretty Girls" to little effect. The band were charged for the sum.

When Gregory joined the band in 1979, Partridge learned that they both shared a longtime enthusiasm for 1960s psychedelic music. An album of songs in that style was immediately put to consideration, but the group could not go through with it due to their commercial obligations to Virgin. (Note: Another consideration Partridge had was the punk movement's antipathy toward pop music of the past: "A real Pol Pot kind of thing, which is ludicrous, and rather nasty.") In November 1984, one month after The Big Express's release, Partridge and John Leckie traveled to Monmouth to produce the album Miss America by singer-songwriter Mary Margaret O'Hara, who had recently signed with Virgin. Partridge and Leckie were dismissed due to conflicts related to their religious affiliations or lack thereof (O'Hara was a devout Catholic). Partridge was feeling inspired by Nick Nicely's 1982 psychedelic single "Hilly Fields 1892", and devised a recording project to fill the newfound gap in his schedule. The rules were as follows: songs must follow the conventions of 1967 and 1968 psychedelia; no more than two takes allowed; use vintage equipment wherever possible. After receiving a £5,000 advance from a skeptical Virgin Records, the group devoted two weeks to the sessions.

Calling themselves "the Dukes of Stratosphear", the spin-off group consisted of Partridge and Moulding with Dave and his drummer brother Ian. Each adopted a pseudonym: Sir John Johns, The Red Curtain, Lord Cornelius Plum and E.I.E.I. Owen. At the sessions, the band dressed themselves in Paisley outfits and lit scented candles. With "nothing to live up to" as the Dukes, Partridge looked back on the project as the "most fun we ever had in the studio ... We never knew if it would sell ... We could never [subvert everybody's expectations] with XTC, as there was too much money involved and we were expected to be mentally honest and 'real.' Too much financial pressure." Released on April Fools' Day 1985, the album was presented as a long-lost collection of recordings by a late 1960s group. When asked about the album in interviews, XTC initially denied having any involvement. In England, the six-track mini-album sold twice as many copies as The Big Express, even before the Dukes' identity was made public. The album also achieved considerable sales in the US.

=== Skylarking and Psonic Psunspot ===
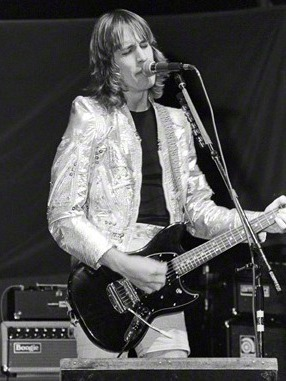
Skylarking producer Todd Rundgren performing with Utopia in 1978

During a routine meeting in early 1986, Virgin executives threatened to drop the band from the label if their next album failed to sell more than 70,000 units. One reason why the group was not selling enough records, Virgin reportedly concluded, was that they sounded "too English". The label forced the group to work with one of their selected American producers. When shown a list of their names, they recognised none except for Todd Rundgren. Gregory was a fan of Rundgren's music, particularly since hearing the 1978 album Hermit of Mink Hollow. His bandmates were not as familiar with Rundgren, but Gregory urged the group to work with him: "I reminded Andy that Todd had produced one of his favourite New York Dolls records [New York Dolls, 1973]. In the absence of any better alternatives, he agreed." Once contacted, Rundgren offered to handle the album's entire recording for a lump sum of $150,000, and the band agreed.

In January 1986, Partridge and Moulding mailed Rundgren a collection of more than 20 demo tapes they had stockpiled in advance. Compared to previous XTC albums, much of the material contrasted significantly with its mellower feel, lush arrangements, and "flowery" aesthetic. Rundgren responded with the idea of a concept album to bridge "Colin's 'pastoral' tunes and subject matter and Andy's 'pop anthems' and sly poetry. ... The album could be about a day, a year, or a lifetime. ... Using this framework, I [Rundgren] came up with a sequence of songs and a justification for their placement and brought it to the band."

After the group arrived at Utopia Sound recording studio in upstate New York, Rundgren played a large role in the album's sound design and drum programming, providing them with string and brass arrangements, as well as an assortment of gear. However, the sessions were fraught with tension, especially between him and Partridge, and disagreements arose over drum patterns, song selections, and other details. Partridge likened the power struggle to "two Hitlers in the same bunker". He expressed resentment toward Rundgren's contributions when sessions concluded, but later softened his view and praised the result. Rundgren said that in spite of all the difficulties, the album "ultimately ... sounds like we were having a great time doing it. And at times we were having a good time."

On Skylarking ... the band has accomplished the remarkable feat of pulling the kinks out of its music without sacrificing its peerless originality. The band members have become the deans of a group of artists who make what can only be described as unpopular pop music, placing a high premium on melody and solid if idiosyncratic songcraft.

— Writer Michael Azzerad, 1989

Skylarking spent one week on the UK album charts, reaching number 90 in November 1986, two weeks after its release. Moulding's "Grass" was chosen as lead single. It was issued exclusively in the UK with the B-side "Dear God", an outtake. "Dear God" became so popular with American college radio stations who imported the record that Geffen Records (XTC's US distributor) recalled and re-pressed Skylarking with the track included. Controversy also broke out over the song's anti-religious lyrics, which inspired some violent incidents. In Florida, a radio station received a bomb threat, and in New York, a student forced their school to play the song over its public-address system by holding a faculty member at knife-point. Nonetheless, the commercial success of "Dear God" propelled Skylarking to sell more than 250,000 units, and it raised the band's profile among American college youth. In the US, the album spent 29 weeks on the Billboard 200 and reached its peak position of number 70 in June 1987. The music video for "Dear God" received the 1987 Billboard Best Video award and was also nominated for three categories at the MTV Video Music Awards. Skylarking ultimately became XTC's best-known album and is generally regarded as their finest work.

Partridge was reluctant to make another Dukes album, but to appease requests from his bandmates and Virgin Records, Psonic Psunspot (1987) was recorded. This time, 10 songs and a £10,000 budget was supplied, while John Leckie returned as producer. Once again, the Dukes' record outsold XTC's previous album in the UK (Skylarking in this case). Partridge felt it was "a bit upsetting to think that people preferred these pretend personalities to our own personalities ... But I don't mind because we have turned into the Dukes slowly over the years." Likewise, Moulding felt that the "psychedelic element was being more ingratiated into the pie" since 25 O'Clock. When issued on CD, Psonic Psunspot was combined with 25 O'Clock and given the title Chips from the Chocolate Fireball (1987).

=== Oranges & Lemons and Nonsuch ===
"Mayor of Simpleton" (1989)
"Mayor of Simpleton", lead single from Oranges & Lemons, adopts a jangle pop style. It became their highest charting single in the US.

For their next album Oranges & Lemons, XTC traveled to Los Angeles to make use of a cheap studio rate arranged by Paul Fox, who was recruited by the band for his first production gig. Another reason for recording in the US with an American producer, said Gregory, was that "America was our biggest market". Mr. Mister (and later longtime King Crimson) member Pat Mastelotto was the drummer for the entire album. The album was released in February 1989 with music that was in a similar psychedelic vein as the Dukes. In a retrospective review, The Quietus' Nick Reed notes: "Nearly every instrument is mixed to the forefront; it's too well-arranged to be cacophonous, but there's a degree of sensory overload, especially given the band's newfound tendency to blast synthesizers in our faces. ... whether or not this album holds up for you depends on how much you like the band's boisterous side." It became the highest album they had in the charts since 1982's English Settlement, rising to number 28 in the UK and number 44 in the US. Additionally, it combined with Skylarking for the group's best-selling albums to date. "Mayor of Simpleton" reached number 46 in the UK and number 72 in the US, making it their only American single to chart.

To support the album, XTC embarked on an acoustic-guitar American radio tour that lasted for two weeks in May. The shows were carried out without financial compensation for the band. Gregory commented that it was an "interesting" style of promotion, but "incredibly hard work", as the band performed at about four radio stations a day for three weeks: "We also did a live acoustic set for MTV in front of an audience which worried Andy a bit but he got through it." This inspired the network to invite more artists to perform stripped-down sets, calling the series "unplugged". XTC's performance of "King for a Day" on Late Night with David Letterman marked the first time the group played in front of a live audience in seven years. A similar acoustic tour was planned for Europe, but cancelled when Partridge discovered that the Paris date would be broadcast from a sold-out 5,000 seater venue. After an unsuccessful attempt was made to coax Partridge back into regular touring, they took a short break. Partridge produced And Love for All (1990), the third album by the Lilac Time, and compered for an unbroadcast children's game show named Matchmakers. Gregory played for Johnny Hates Jazz, Marc Almond and Francesco Messina whilst producing for Cud. Moulding performed a special event concert with David Marx and the Refugees, a Swindon-based band that reunited him with Barry Andrews.

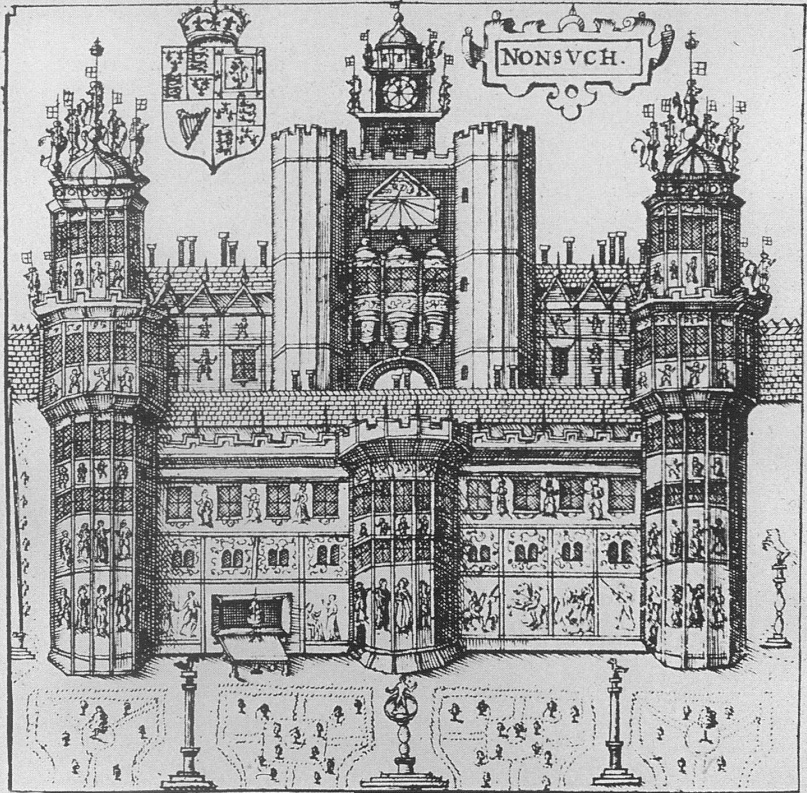
A 17th-century map of Nonsuch Palace illustrated by cartographer John Speed, which served as the basis of the album cover

Tarquin Gotch, who served as XTC's manager for a short time, helped the band reach a legal settlement with Ian Reid in 1989. However, they were again left with a six-figure debt. Virgin Records advanced the group enough money to cover their debt in exchange for the promise of four additional albums. Having written more than two dozen songs by 1991, some difficulties prolonged the start of recording sessions for the next album. Initially, the band had issue with the musical director of Virgin, who, after seeing the songs, was convinced the band "could do better" and asked them to write more material. (Note: Jeremy Lascelles: "I said, Andy, you've written this song before, it's another Beach Boys song, another Beatles song ... He wasn't really stretching himself – it was good but a bit comfortable. He didn't like me saying that and I didn't play them to anyone else, which he took to be a great slight." In Partridge's recollection, the director threatened that Virgin would drop the band if the band don't write an album "of twelve Top Ten guaranteed singles," and noted that this attitude held the band up in recording the album, which they refused to rewrite, believing its songs to be among the greatest they had written.) With the band sitting on the material, the director left the label a year later, and his replacement liked the band's content, hurrying them to record the album. Gus Dudgeon produced, even though Partridge felt he was the wrong choice, and Fairport Convention's Dave Mattacks was brought in as drummer.

Nonsuch was received with critical acclaim when released in April 1992, and like Oranges & Lemons, peaked at number 28 in the UK, becoming their second consecutive and final Top 40 album. Rolling Stone's Michael Azerrad reviewed: "Emphasizing wonder and wit in opposition to the rage of most college rock, XTC makes alternative music for people who don't like 'alternative music'." Lead single "The Disappointed" reached number 33 in the UK and was nominated for an Ivor Novello Award. Its follow-up "The Ballad of Peter Pumpkinhead" reached number 71. "Wrapped in Grey" was intended as the third single, and about 5,000 copies were pressed before being withdrawn from sale. Partridge remembered thinking, "that's it, they've suffocated one of our kids in the cot, they've murdered the album, basically through ignorance." In 1993, the album was nominated for a Grammy Award for Best Alternative Music Album, but lost to Tom Waits' Bone Machine.

== 1993–present: legal entanglement, return and breakup ==
=== Strike period ===
In 1993, Partridge conceived XTC's next project to be an album of bubblegum pop songs disguising itself as a retrospective compilation featuring 12 different groups from the early 1970s. The lyrics were also heavily sexual, with song titles such as "Lolly (Suck It and See)" and "Visit to the Doctor". Partridge recalled playing some demos for Virgin agents, and compared their reaction to the "Springtime for Hitler" scene from the 1967 film The Producers. The label rejected his idea. Virgin denied Partridge's requests to renegotiate or revoke XTC's contract. Paul Kinder believed that the label and the group were "poles apart" and that "the contract was so old it got to the point where Andy wanted the moon and Virgin weren't prepared to give it him."

Whatever new music the band recorded would have been automatically owned by Virgin, and so the band enacted strike action against the label. Prince and George Michael also went on a strike against their respective labels that was heavily publicized at about the same time. XTC's strike, however, received little press. In the meantime, Partridge produced Martin Newell's 1993 album The Greatest Living Englishman and early sessions for Blur's second album. "I thought I did sterling work. ... Next day, [David Balfe from the Teardrop Explodes said], 'Quite frankly, Andy, this is shit.'" Other complications arose; he developed some health issues, and his wife divorced him.

In 1997 (also reported as in late 1994), XTC found themselves freed from financial debt and from Virgin after "making some heavy concessions". Partridge fantasised that people from the label "met in the dark and thought, 'These blokes are not making a living. We've had 'em all these years and we've got their catalogue and the copyright to their songs for evermore and we've stitched 'em up real good with a rotten deal so, erm, maybe we should let them go.' I like to think that it was a guilt thing." One of the group's first new recordings since the strike was released for the tribute album A Testimonial Dinner: The Songs of XTC (1995). "The Good Things", a Moulding song originally demoed for Oranges & Lemons, was credited under the pseudonym Terry and the Lovemen. In 1998, Song Stories, an authorized overview of the band's catalog by journalist and longtime friend Neville Farmer was published. Partridge said the book was badly edited and "used the crappiest quotes".

=== Apple Venus and Wasp Star ===
For the orchestral Apple Venus, the budget allowed a day of recording at Abbey Road [with] a 40-piece band [that failed to] match the mathematical precision of [the arrangements] [...] The [recordings had to be sampled], cut and pasted together to achieve the "Vaughan Williams with a hard-on" sound required.

— Paul Morrish of The Independent, 1999

By late 1997, Partridge and Moulding had amassed a large stockpile of material. The former's songs were an elaboration on the more orchestral style he developed with Nonsuch tracks "Omnibus", "Wrapped in Grey", and "Rook". Moulding felt that "something a bit different" was appropriate for the band at this juncture, and shared Partridge's desire for a cohesive LP similar to soundtracks such as My Fair Lady and "stuff that Burt Bacharach wrote for various [films]". Partridge thought the new songs were "some of the best stuff, if not the best stuff, ever. It's even more intensely passionate than before."

The group elected to divide the album into two parts: one of rock songs, and the other of orchestral/acoustic songs augmented by a 40-piece symphony. They found a label, Cooking Vinyl, and a producer, Haydn Bendall, who had engineered XTC's debut EP back in 1977 and had significant experience in recording orchestras. Prairie Prince, who drummed on Skylarking, returned for the sessions. It soon became apparent that the band did not have the funds to record all the material they had. Gregory, Moulding, and Bendall wanted to reduce the project to one disc, but Partridge insisted on spreading it over two LPs. It was decided that they release one album with the orchestral portions ("volume 1") and leave the rock songs for its follow-up ("volume 2"). A session was booked at Abbey Road, but the recording was rushed, lasting one day, and had to be edited over a three-month period.

Gregory quit the band whilst in the middle of sessions due to personal issues and discord with his bandmates. Partridge told journalists that Gregory left because he grew impatient with the recording of the orchestral material and wanted to quickly move on to the second project, which would have consisted of rock songs. He attributed Gregory's frustration to diabetic mood swings, as did Moulding. Gregory denied that his leaving pertained to "musical differences", and that it was moreso "personal problems" related to Partridge.

"River of Orchids" (1999)
Apple Venus Volume 1 relied almost entirely on orchestral or acoustic instruments.

Released in February 1999, Apple Venus Volume 1 was met with critical acclaim and moderate sales. It had minimal promotion. Comparing the album to the group's earlier work, Pitchfork reviewer Zach Hooker wrote: "Apple Venus finds them picking up pretty much where they left off. Or maybe even a little bit before they left off: this record bridges the gap between the ambitiously poppy Oranges and Lemons and the pastoral Skylarking. ... The music is built on simple phrases, but the relationships between those phrases becomes tremendously complex." In contrast, the companion album Wasp Star (Apple Venus Volume 2) (2000), consisting of more guitar-based material, was regarded as one of the band's "weakest" albums. Upon release, its British chart peak was higher than Volume 1, at number 40 in the UK, while in the US it was lower, at number 108. Partridge believed that some parts of the album was when "the [artistic] slope started to go down".

=== Fuzzy Warbles and disintegrated partnership ===
After Wasp Star, newly recorded XTC material was released sporadically. The four-disc hits and rarities boxed set Coat of Many Cupboards (2002) included "Didn't Hurt a Bit", a rerecording of a Nonsuch outtake. The Dukes of Stratosphear—with Dave and Ian Gregory—were reunited for the charity single "Open a Can (of Human Beans)" (2003). Another set, Apple Box (2005), included two new tracks: "Spiral", written by Partridge and "Say It", by Moulding. These songs were available to purchasers of the box set in digital format only, with the use of a special download code. This followed with a digital-exclusive track, Moulding's "Where Did the Ordinary People Go?", released in December 2005.

From 2002 to 2006, Partridge simultaneously released volumes in the multi-album Fuzzy Warbles series, a set dedicated to unreleased solo demos and other material. Moulding was initially attached to the project, but opted out because "I just wouldn't have found it very inspiring. Maybe a couple of volumes would've been okay, or just one. But he [Andy] wanted to do twelve, which kind of put the wind up me a little bit. We had a bit of an argument about it." He felt that such "petty" arguments about XTC's finances precipitated the band's unofficial break-up, as he said in reference to the Fuzzy Warbles collection, "I got the impression he was going for broke ..." Partridge said that the impetus for the project was the proliferation of bootleggers who were selling low-quality copies of the material and that the Fuzzy Warbles set earned him more money than XTC's back catalog on Virgin. He also did not feel that XTC were a band anymore: "It's more of a brand. It's more HP Sauce than ever. [Colin and I are] two selfish middle-aged gits who make the music we make."

He [Colin] told me some months back that he's not interested in music anymore, and doesn't want to write, and basically said, "Our paths will cross again or they'll be involved in some way." And then he proceeded to move away from his house.

— Andy Partridge, 2007

In 2006, Partridge recorded an album, Monstrance, with Barry Andrews and drummer Martyn Barker. During one of the sessions, some of his hearing was destroyed following a studio mishap, which caused him to develop severe and permanent tinnitus. Near the end of the year, he told an interviewer that Moulding recently ("a couple of months back") lost interest in writing, performing or even listening to music. He remained hopeful that the situation was temporary and assured that they had "not killed off the XTC head. I mean, we still have the head cryogenically frozen. ... It's no good making a record and calling it XTC, certainly, if Colin isn't involved." In November, he stated that he had been forced to regard the group "in the past tense", with no likelihood of a new project unless Moulding should have a change of heart. Months later, Partridge intimated that Moulding had moved and changed his phone number, effectively ending all contact between the two and reducing their correspondence to emails exchanged via their manager to discuss the division of the band's assets. Partridge also said he and Gregory—their differences now resolved—had considered working together again.

There was no official announcement that we'd finished. I just got wind that Andy didn't really want to make another record, but he didn't tell me and maybe he didn't know himself. ... I just think we were two old men who didn't really talk much.

— Colin Moulding, 2018

In July 2008, Partridge wrote in the Swindon Advertiser that he believed his "musical partnership with Colin Moulding has come to an end. For reasons too personal and varied to go into here, but we had a good run as they say and produced some real good work. No, I won't be working with him in the future." In December, Moulding resurfaced for a live radio interview where he confirmed his recent disillusionment with music, but revealed that he was thinking of working on solo material. His given reasons for the break-up were financial discord, disagreement over the extent of the Fuzzy Warbles project, and a "change in mindset" between him and Partridge. He also stated that he and Partridge were once again communicating directly by email.

=== Reissue programme and TC&I ===
XTC did not technically break up in a legal sense. As of 2014, the group still existed as a trademark controlled by Partridge and Moulding. Throughout the 2010s, selected albums from the band's catalog were reissued as deluxe packages centred on new stereo and surround sound mixes by Steven Wilson. Partridge said that he did not "insist on any mastering or messing with XTC 5.1" and that his involvement with Wilson's mixes goes only as far as authorizing them. The official XTC Twitter account @xtcfans was originally managed by writer Todd Bernhardt. According to Partridge, after some time, "I sort of took it over, because I thought it was weird that there was another person in the way." In 2016, Partridge and Bernhardt released a book, Complicated Game: Inside the Songs of XTC, that contains discussions between the two about 29 XTC songs, one Partridge solo track, and an overview of his approach to songwriting. It was published by Jawbone Press.

Until 2016, Moulding remained largely inactive as a musician. In October 2017, he and Terry Chambers issued a four-song EP, Great Aspirations (credited to "TC&I"). Its release coincided with a televised documentary film of the band's career, XTC: This Is Pop, which premiered on Sky Arts on 7 October. The documentary featured new interviews with Partridge, Gregory, Moulding and Chambers. Moulding praised the film and commented on the possibility of a full-fledged XTC reunion: "They say never say never, don't they? It would seem unlikely, put it that way." As of January 2018, Partridge maintained that the group would "not be recording together again."

From 29 October to 20 November, TC&I performed six sold-out shows at Swindon's Art's Centre, in Old Town. For the shows, TC&I was augmented by Steve Tilling (from Circu5), Gary Bamford, Susannah Bevington, and Moulding's son, Lee Moulding. It was the first time Moulding and Chambers had played a live gig in decades. TC&I subsequently released a live album of the shows titled Naked Flames.

In 2021, Moulding told Mojo that he and Partridge had recently become on good terms with each other. "[Andy and I] didn't speak for a long time, except about business, and then it was quite terse. But we're quite cordial with each other now, it's probably as good as it's been for quite some time. Would we do XTC again? (laughs) I don't think we would, because I'm not sure whether I could put up with his dictatorial ways any more, or whether he could put up with me."

On 13 April 2024, it was announced that original keyboardist Jon Perkins had died at the age of 66.

== Musical style and development ==
=== Group dynamic ===
==== Partridge and Moulding ====
Andy had a sort of unwritten rule that everything we did had to be completely original ... any rock clichés, any imitation of our fashionable peers meant the part—and in some cases the song—would be dumped!

— Dave Gregory, 2007

XTC's principal songwriters were guitarist Andy Partridge and bassist Colin Moulding. Partridge, who wrote the majority of XTC's songs, was the group's frontman and de facto leader. He drove the band's image, designed many of their record sleeves, and handled most of their interviews. (Note: He described himself as the band's "battery" and expressed resentment "that the other three, inevitably, would go off sightseeing while muggins here would be needed for radio, TV and magazine interviews." Moulding said he was "happy for him to do the talking.") His involvement with XTC's record sleeves stemmed from his disappointment with the sleeve for the "Statue of Liberty" single, which depicted a poorly cropped photo of the statue and the XTC logo in red. He was less successful in his attempts to involve himself in the band's music videos, as he said, the woman in charge of Virgin's video department rebuked all his ideas, some of which other groups later adopted in award-winning videos.

Partridge and Moulding did not write together. Of their partnership, Moulding stated in 1992: "There's a lot of freedom to do what each of us likes with the other's songs, however. ... Each person puts his little prints on them." They did collaborate on arrangements, with "horn lines and harmonies, that sort of thing." He also lent praise to Partridge as "a real ideas man, and I love good ideas. It's not hard contributing bass parts when you have such good songs to contribute to." (Note: Occasionally, Partridge also took to recording the bass parts, such as on Moulding's "What in the World??..." and "Vanishing Girl", however, it was out of necessity in those cases due to recording logistics.)

Discussing Moulding's songs, Partridge said that few were included on XTC albums because Moulding was not a prolific writer. Gregory said that all of Moulding's proposed songs would be recorded to preserve democracy in the band, and "occasionally at the expense of some of Andy's often superior offerings. This didn't always go down well, either with Andy or the band, but Colin did have some killer melodies and a sweeter sound to his voice that made a welcome diversion when listening to an album as a whole." Partridge opined that Moulding's songs initially "came out as weird imitations of what I was doing", but by the time of Drums and Wires, "he really started to take off as a songwriter." He was more effused with Moulding's offerings for Skylarking, which included the highest ratio of Moulding songs for any XTC album. On Moulding's bass-playing, Partridge praised his "old-fashioned" tendency to match notes to the bass drum.

In Song Stories, Neville Farmer comments that Partridge "is the boss—erratic but willful [and] runs the band on instinct", while Moulding "is the voice of calm ... a foil to Andy's radical side." Music journalist Peter Paphides felt that the songwriters' personalities "couldn't seem more different," with Moulding "phlegmatic, shy, and heartbreakingly pretty" and Partridge an "art-school dropout ... uptight, dominating and extrovert." In Moulding's view, Partridge also typically acted as an "executive producer" for albums while frequently undermining the authority of the actual credited producer. (Note: Partridge commented: "There's a lot of, 'Andy must be awful in the studio' [written on the Internet]. I'm not, I'm mister fucking nice!" He said that the only producers he ever had trouble with were Todd Rundgren on Skylarking and Gus Dudgeon on Nonsuch.) Their recording approaches differed in that Moulding sometimes preferred spontaneous or imperfect performances, whereas Partridge working method was to refine a song through repeated takes. The band occasionally took to the term "Andy-ness" to describe Partridge's studio indulgences. (Note: Partridge thought of the band's producers as "a funnel through which I can talk to other members of the band ... They'll accept it coming from another person, but they won't accept it from a contemporary.") Despite this, they rarely found themselves encumbered by serious creative differences. In 1997, Moulding called one dispute over a Skylarking bass part the "only real argument" between him and Partridge in the band's history.

==== Andrews, Gregory and drummers ====
Barry Andrews, XTC's keyboard player for their first two albums, emerged as a third solo songwriter on the group's second album Go 2, and left the band shortly thereafter. His replacement, guitarist Dave Gregory, did not contribute songs, but was the only one in the band who could score music, and frequently contributed orchestral arrangements. Moulding said that when Andrews was in the band, Partridge had "no kind of foil" to work with, as both musicians were drawn to dissonant harmonies: "[Andy] used to like the real kind of angular, spiky, upward-thrusting guitar ... if one is angular, the other has to kind of straighten him out ... So when Dave came in, and was a much straighter player, it seemed to make more sense, I think." Starting in 1982, Gregory extended his talents to keyboards as well, since Partridge and Moulding were not adept with the instrument.

Gregory never presented a completed idea for a song to the band partly because he felt intimidated by Partridge's scrutiny. (Note: During the sessions for Drums and Wires or Black Sea, Gregory did present an original song, but it was rejected on the grounds that it was too derivative of Steely Dan.) Since he "couldn't continue grinding out old blues clichés and power chords," he decided to "think more in terms of the songs as the masters and the instruments as the servants." Discussing Gregory's contributions to the group, Farmer writes of "a precision and correctness that carries through from his prerehearsal of guitar solos to ... his encyclopedic knowledge of guitars and who-played-what-on-which-instrument-with-which-amplifier-in-which-studio-on-which-record-under-the-influence-of-what-star-sign-or-guru-or-drug."

Terry Chambers was the band's original drummer. He was described by Partridge as "the [drummer] that's been the most primitive, but probably the most thrilling for inventiveness, because he would blunder into [different ideas]." One of his characteristic techniques was the use of hi-hat chokes. After he left in 1983, the group employed a succession of session drummers for their studio recordings. This included Pete Phipps (Mummer and The Big Express), Prairie Prince (Skylarking and Apple Venus), Pat Mastelotto (Oranges & Lemons), and Dave Mattacks (Nonsuch). Drum machines also began to be incorporated into the group's sound. None of the studio drummers were accepted as official members of the band. Partridge explained that this was because the group did not tour and because "There's lots of local, interpersonal language that means nothing to anybody outside the band and is very difficult to bring people into."

=== Genres and influences ===
I'd like to be considered in the tradition of bands like the Kinks and Small Faces, when bands weren't quite naive, but they had a sort of group feeling about them and were gently experimental and psychedelic within pop song formats.

— Andy Partridge, 1981

In the mid 1970s, XTC played in London punk scenes and were consistent with music of the new wave, albeit with a heavy ska influence. Partridge felt that their music was pop from the beginning, not punk or new wave as is often suggested, and that the terms in themselves are redundant of "pop". As they became more of a studio band, their material grew progressively more complex. Later, XTC were sometimes suggested as being a prog band. Partridge did not feel the band were prog and expressed hesitancy with the word "progressive", saying that he preferred to call the band "exploratory pop" in the same vein as the Beatles or the Kinks. In his words, "Prog is just longer pop songs."

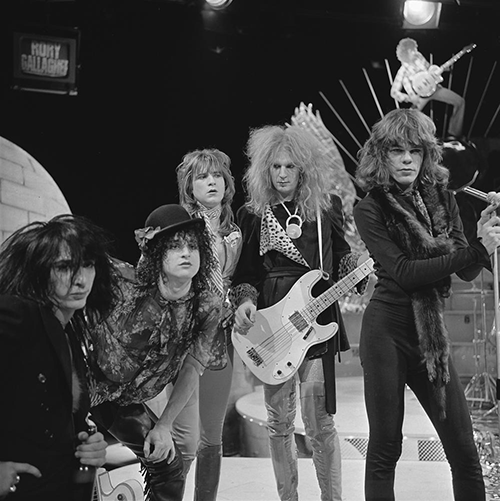
XTC initially modeled themselves after New York Dolls (pictured 1973).

The band's early influences included disco, dub reggae, music hall, the Beatles, Free, the Kinks, Captain Beefheart, the Stooges, the New York Dolls, Cockney Rebel, Motown, Can, David Bowie, the Groundhogs, Black Sabbath, and the organ-dominated records of Johnny and the Hurricanes. The New York Dolls' single "Jet Boy" was a particular favorite for XTC. Partridge denied in 2019 that the Velvet Underground were an influence, but in 1984 expressed a fondness for "things with pounding piano, everything from Velvet Underground's 'I'm Waiting for My Man', to things that people like the Beatles or the Rolling Stones did at any time I just love banana-fingers piano." Moreso than Partridge, Moulding was fond of heavy metal groups such as Black Sabbath and Uriah Heep, as well as Deep Purple, Cream, and Free.

XTC were not initially public with their influences due to the punk scene's anathema toward stating one's influences. Pitchfork writer Chris Dahlen characterised the band's original sound as punk meets "Buddy Holly-on-amphetamines ... danceable enough for the crowds at the clubs, and suspiciously poppy thanks to the catchy hooks and their trademark verse-chorus-verse-chorus-explode pattern." Partridge said that he adopted a vocal style out of "fear that we weren't going to make another record ... and people weren't going to be left with any impression of the singer". He described it as a "walrus" or "seal bark" that amalgamated Buddy Holly's "hiccup", Elvis Presley's vibrato, and "the howled mannerisms of Steve Harley." In reference to the energy of the band's performances (which drew comparisons with Talking Heads), Partridge remembered how they "used to fucking kill ourselves. I think it was fear. It was fear manifested in ludicrously high energy music. It was like 1000% whaaahh! All of the songs were run together and it was really uptempo stuff." According to Moulding, "any kinship [XTC had] with punk" was gone after 1979's Motown-influenced "Life Begins at the Hop".

Of his guitar technique, Partridge said that it evolved from his desire to be a drummer, to "chop and slash and try to work between what the drums were doing, a) so I could be heard, and b) because I liked the funk and I liked working the holes that the drums left." He was particularly influenced by John French, the drummer for Captain Beefheart's Magic Band, although he disliked that the drummer's groove would change every few bars. Gregory attributed XTC's unorthodox drum patterns to Partridge's affinity for dub and reggae; "He's got a great innate sense of rhythm. He'll say 'No, don't put that beat there, why don't you come down on 3 instead of 2 on this part here?' ... He never put [cymbal crashes] where you'd expect to find them." Producer Chris Hughes likened the band's fashion of playing guitar to an automated music sequencer.

"Wrapped in Grey" (1992)
"Wrapped in Grey" was one of numerous XTC songs influenced by the Beach Boys. (Note: Other songs inspired by the Beach Boys included "Season Cycle", "Chalkhills and Children", "Humble Daisy", and "Books Are Burning".)

Over the next few years, XTC began showcasing their vintage psychedelic influences through the use of Mellotron and backwards tape recordings on the albums Mummer and The Big Express. In 1987, he acknowledged that the group had "really changed personality. We didn't notice it bit by bit but over 10 years, suddenly it seems, wow, we're different."

The Beach Boys' 1968 rendition of "Bluebirds Over the Mountain" was one of the first records Partridge bought with his own money. Although it is widely assumed that the Beach Boys influenced XTC throughout their career, Partridge stated that he was originally only familiar with singles such as "I Get Around" (1964) and "Good Vibrations" (1967) which were an enormous influence for him. It was not until 1986 that he discovered that the Beach Boys had an album career, when he first heard Smiley Smile (1967) in its entirety. Moulding credited the arrival of Dave Gregory with reviving Partridge's interest in 1960s bands like the Kinks. However, Partridge similarly only knew of the Kinks through the group's 1960s singles, and did not listen to any of their albums until the late 1980s. Partridge also claimed that "the Beatles were the farthest thing from my mind" until 1982; at another time he stated that the opening F chord on XTC's 1978 single "This Is Pop" was directly based on the opening chord from the Beatles' "A Hard Day's Night" (1964). (Note: Of the Beatles' influence, Partridge also drew comparisons to his "No Language in Our Lungs", "Senses Working Overtime", "You're the Wish You Are I Had", "The Mole from the Ministry", and "Here Comes President Kill Again". The night after John Lennon was killed, XTC played a gig at Liverpool, where they performed both "Towers of London" and "Rain" in tribute to the Beatle.)

Discussing the recording of the Mummer track "Ladybird", Partridge recalled that he told producer Steve Nye that he was afraid people would think he was copying the Beatles, to which Nye's response was "Who gives a fuck?" Partridge said that "from that moment onward, I started to recognise that those songwriters—the Ray Davieses, the Lennons and McCartneys, the Brian Wilsons—had gone into my head really deeply. He later considered "Rook" (1992), "Wrapped in Grey" (1992) and "Easter Theatre" (1999) to be the "perfect songs" of his career, feeling that he had "exorcized a lot of those kind of Lennon-and-McCartney, Bacharach-and-David, Brian Wilson type ghosts out of my system by doing all that." Reportedly, when Brian Wilson was played the Dukes' "Pale and Precious", a pastiche of the Beach Boys, he thought it was styled after Paul McCartney.

== Lyricism and English culture ==
Among the scores of songs Partridge wrote for XTC are perfect examples of a very English genre: rock music uprooted from the glamour and dazzle of the city, and recast as the soundtrack to life in suburbs, small towns, and the kind of places – like Swindon – that may be more sizeable, but are still held up as bywords for broken hopes and limited horizons.

— John Harris, 2010

XTC are noted for their "Englishness". Partridge denied that this was conscious on his part: "I don't try to be English. I guess because I am English, it comes out English. But I don't sit down and think, "Cor blimey, can I put a union jack and a beefeater's outfit on, Mary?" British music critic John Harris identified Partridge's XTC compositions as within the same "lineage" of small town English songwriting invented by Ray Davies of the Kinks, and followed by the Jam, the Specials, "scores of half-forgotten punk and new wave bands," the Smiths and mid 1990s Britpop. In Partridge's opinion, the band "never got beyond Swindon." (Note: Songs inspired by the town or its people included "Life Begins at the Hop", "Wait Till Your Boat Goes Down", "Ball and Chain", "The Everyday Story of Smalltown", "I Remember the Sun", "Red Brick Dream", "Grass", "The Meeting Place", and "Boarded Up".) He also felt that XTC being described as "pastoral" was a compliment: "'Pastoral' to me means being more in touch with the country than the city, which I think we are. London gives me the willies." Lyrically, he cited Ray Davies, John Lennon, and Paul McCartney as his biggest influences.

According to biographer Neville Farmer, Partridge and Moulding tended to write about "more general aspects of their lives and their attitudes". Farmer added that "Colin nor Andy handle political or religious matters with subtlety. If they have an idea about something, they say it straightforwardly. They are no more embarrassed about their view on the world than Andy is about his sex life. That makes them easy targets for criticism." For Partridge, other popular subject matter included financial shortage, factory work, comic book characters, seafaring, war, and ancient rituals. He described himself as an atheist and said he did not become interested in politics until circa 1979, when he voted for Margaret Thatcher "purely because she was a woman. I was that naive. Now I'm very left."

== Recognition and influence ==
Writing for AllMusic, music critic Stephen Thomas Erlewine recognised the group thus:

XTC was one of the smartest – and catchiest – British pop bands to emerge from the punk and new wave explosion of the late '70s. ... While popular success has eluded them in both Britain and America, the group has developed a devoted cult following in both countries that remains loyal over two decades after their first records. ... XTC's lack of commercial success isn't because their music isn't accessible – their bright, occasionally melancholy, melodies flow with more grace than most bands – it has more to do with the group constantly being out of step with the times. However, the band has left behind a remarkably rich and varied series of albums that make a convincing argument that XTC is the great lost pop band.

XTC were one of the progenitors of Britpop, were influential to later power pop acts such as Jellyfish and the Apples in Stereo, and anticipated the indie/art pop bands of the 2000s. They also inspired tribute bands, tribute albums, fan conventions, and fansites. (Note: The unofficial site Chalkhills.org has been described as an "exhaustive" resource for XTC information. Chalkhills began as a mailing list in 1989 and later expanded to a website devoted to the group's songs and history, including pictures, lyrics and chord charts.) Dave Gregory said that he became aware of XTC's "huge" influence on American acts through his interactions with musicians in the late 1980s. They Might Be Giants paid tribute to them in their song, "XTC vs. Adam Ant". XTC also had a significant influence and cult following in Japan. By the late 1980s, they were supported by three dedicated fanzines in as many countries. Between 1979 and 1992, they had a total of 10 albums and 6 singles that reached the UK top 40.

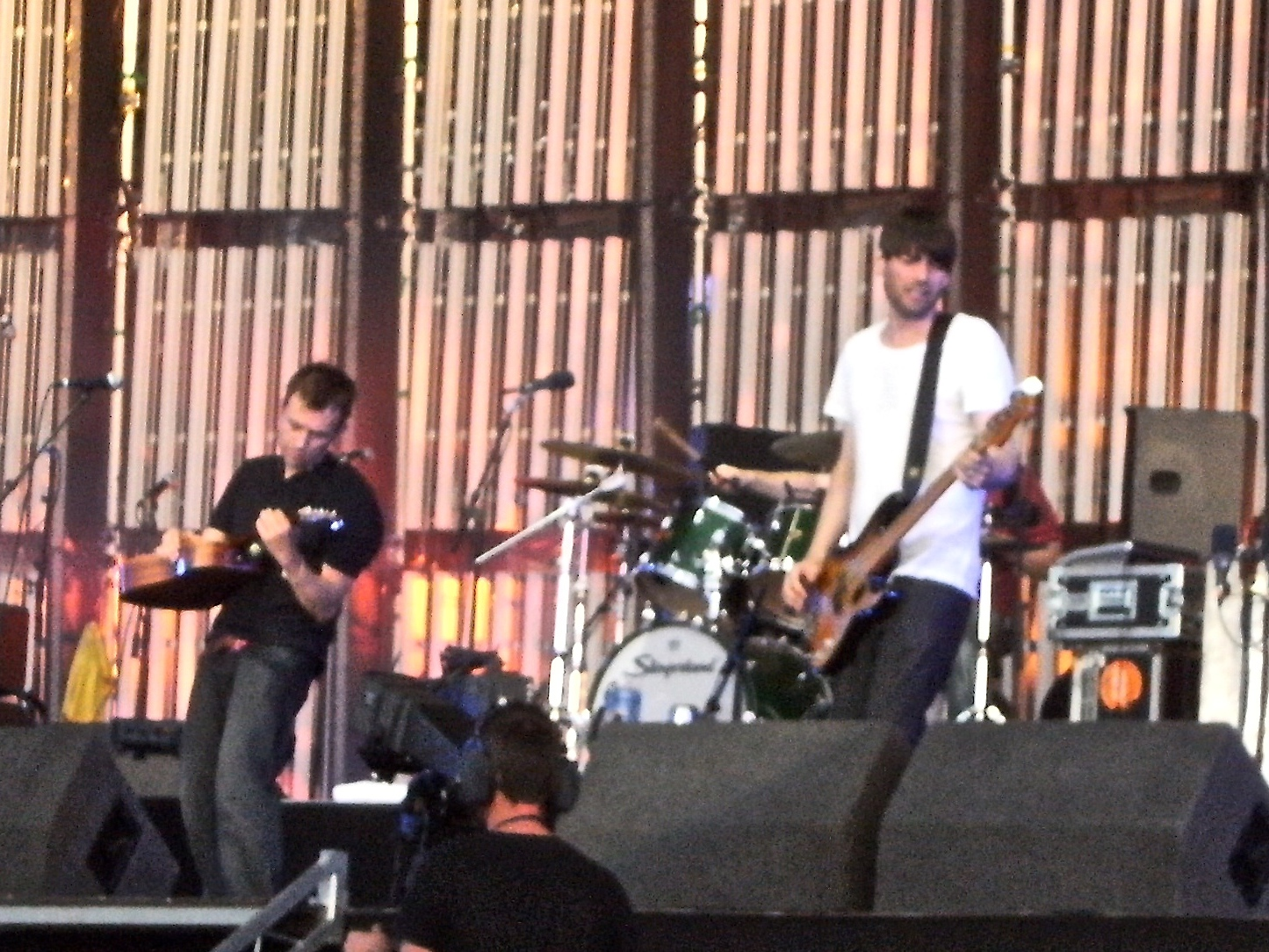
Among 1990s Britpop bands, XTC were particularly influential on Blur (pictured 2009).

The band are often compared reverentially to 1960s acts such as the Who, the Kinks, and most frequently, the Beatles. In a 1991 article that focused on a resurgence of power pop groups, members of Jellyfish and the Posies reflected that they were drawn to 1960s artists because of the 1980s music they influenced. As the Posies' Jon Auer said: "our '60s-ish-ness is actually early-'80s-ish-ness, a pop sensibility that came from listening to Squeeze and XTC". According to Chris Ingham, acts such as Kula Shaker, the Shamen and the Stone Roses recruited engineer John Leckie chiefly because of his productions for the retro-psychedelic Dukes of Stratosphear records. Japanese band Seagull Screaming Kiss Her Kiss Her was named after the XTC song of similar title. Peter Gabriel is quoted: "I've always looked to XTC for inventive songwriting, innovative production, and a sense of humor. It's their strong blend of personalities that make them one of the great British bands." Kurt Cobain of Nirvana said in 1991: "There's a lot of good pop music. I've always liked it…bands like the Beatles, XTC, stuff like that." Minor Threat, Dag Nasty, and Bad Religion veteran Brian Baker has also cited XTC as an influence.

Discussing the band's relative obscurity and lack of financial success, Schabe said that "it's difficult to justify claims of greatness without trying to understand exactly why they never managed to rise above the status of cult band. Respect and recognition are the real validation of such claims, not financial success". Andy Partridge characterized the band as "quietly influential" and thought that the decision to quit touring "definitely affected our popularity later on". Schabe disagreed that the lack of touring had an effect and wrote that "XTC suffered more from the hands of industry forces than they did from failure to find an audience." Partridge also estimated that XTC's fan demographic had a male/female ratio of about 60–40, which was "reassuring" to him, as he thought the band only appealed to "computer nerds". In the 1981 edition of Rolling Stone's Book of Rock Lists, XTC were ranked number 15 for its list of the "17 Loudest Bands in the World", ahead of Queen and Kiss.

XTC were the only group besides the Stranglers to emerge from the punk scene with a keyboardist. Journalist Steven Hyden of The A.V. Club wrote that their style of "post-punk guitar pop" became popular in the early 2000s among bands such as Kaiser Chiefs, Franz Ferdinand, Hot Hot Heat, and Bloc Party. During the decade, there was a reevaluation of post-punk: Shabe wrote that it "led to XTC being revered in association with the groundbreakers of that era." Musicologist Alex Ogg listed XTC as one of several "unheralded" events in the history of post-punk, while Eric Klinger of PopMatters posited: "You might not hear of bands talking about XTC as a big influence the way they talk about, say, Gang of Four, but they were certainly in the mix that became the music that was to come." (Note: Partridge commented in 2006 that virtually "every [English] band that comes up gets compared to us, whether it's the Kaiser Chiefs, or Franz Ferdinand, or the Futureheads.")

=== British reception ===
Despite their "Englishness", the group's fanbase has been more concentrated in the US than the UK. (Note: As early as 1983, the vast majority of their fanmail was from the US.) They refused to conform to punk's simplicity, a point that the British press initially criticised. Partridge believed "we were trying to push music into a new area. And so we had to suffer the slings and arrows of outrageous name calling because we refused to just play stupid." He recalled that when he played at a jam session with punk bands in the late 1970s, the drummer from X-Ray Spex shouted "Oh, you can fucking play, can you? Oh, listen to him, he can play." In 1988, writer Chris Hunt observed that "XTC have largely not found favour in their homeland. To a nation that judges success in terms of tabloid coverage and appearances on Top of the Pops, the retiring bards of rural olde England didn't really strike too loud a chord with the record buying public. XTC had just become 'too weird' for their own good." Musician and journalist Dominique Leone argued that they "deserved more than they ever got. From the press, the public, their label, and various managers, XTC have been a tragically under-appreciated band in every sense."

Swindon did not have a respected music scene as other places in Britain. Partridge cited the group's origins as the main reason for their ill-repute: "if we came from a big city like London or Manchester, we would have probably have been heralded as more godlike." In another interview, he suggested that both their small-town origins and the British class system were reasons for a lack of appreciation in their native country: "XTC were clever and came from Swindon, so therefore we were crap ... I was always jealous of bands like Talking Heads, who were doing similar things to us but were from New York, and therefore cool. But the English don't like normal people doing intelligent things." He remembered the group being advised by their early management to change their accents and deny their Swindon origins, but "we thought it was a badge of honour, coming from the comedy town."

== Awards and nominations ==
Award	Year	Nominee(s)	Category	Result	Ref.
Grammy Awards	1993	Nonsuch	Best Alternative Music Album	Nominated	
Ivor Novello Awards	1993	"The Disappointed"	Best Song Musically and Lyrically	Nominated	
MTV Video Music Awards	1988	"Dear God"	Best Concept Video	Nominated	
MTV Video Music Awards	1988	"Dear God"	Breakthrough Video	Nominated	
MTV Video Music Awards	1988	"Dear God"	Best Direction	Nominated	
Q Awards	2014	Andy Partridge	Classic Songwriter	Won	

== Members ==
Principal members

- Andy Partridge – vocals, guitar (1972–2006)
- Colin Moulding – vocals, bass guitar (1972–2006)
- Terry Chambers – drums, backing vocals (1972–1982)
- Barry Andrews – keyboards, vocals (1976–1978)
- Dave Gregory – guitar, keyboards, backing vocals (1979–1998)

Early members (pre-1975 Star Park and Helium Kidz era)

- Dave Cartner – guitar (1972–1974)
- Nervous Steve – bass guitar (1972)
- Paul Wilson – drums (1972)
- Steve Hutchins – vocals (1974–1975)
- Jon Perkins – keyboards (1975–1976; died 2024)

Timeline

== Discography ==
Studio albums

- White Music (1978)
- Go 2 (1978)
- Drums and Wires (1979)
- Black Sea (1980)
- English Settlement (1982)
- Mummer (1983)
- The Big Express (1984)
- 25 O'Clock (1985, The Dukes of Stratosphear)
- Skylarking (1986)
- Psonic Psunspot (1987, The Dukes of Stratosphear)
- Oranges & Lemons (1989)
- Nonsuch (1992)
- Apple Venus Volume 1 (1999)
- Wasp Star (Apple Venus Volume 2) (2000)

See also

- Take Away / The Lure of Salvage (1980, XTC dub remixes credited to "Mr. Partridge")
- Rag and Bone Buffet: Rare Cuts and Leftovers (1990)
- Transistor Blast: The Best of the BBC Sessions (1998)
- Coat of Many Cupboards (2002)
- Fuzzy Warbles (2002–2006, Andy Partridge demos of solo and XTC tracks)
- Great Aspirations (2017, Colin Moulding and Terry Chambers reunion EP)

== Filmography ==
Documentary films

- XTC at the Manor (1980, staged studio recording of "Towers of London" and interviews)
- Urgh! A Music War (1982, contains live performance of "Respectable Street")
- XTC Play at Home (1984, interviews and promotional videos)
- XTC: This Is Pop (2017, interviews, archival footage and animations)

Music videos

- "Science Friction" (1977)
- "Statue of Liberty" (1978)
- "This is Pop?" (1978)
- "Heatwave" (1978)
- "Are You Receiving Me?" (1978)
- "Making Plans For Nigel" (1979)
- "Life Begins at the Hop" (1979)
- "Towers of London" (1980)
- "Generals and Majors" (1980)
- "Respectable Street" (1981)
- "Ball and Chain" (1982)
- "All of A Sudden (It's Too Late) (1982)
- "Senses Working Overtime" (1982)
- "Beating of Hearts" (1983)
- "Funk Pop A Roll" (1983)
- "Love on a Farmboy's Wages" (1983)
- "Wonderland" (1983)
- "Human Alchemy" (1983)
- "In Loving Memory of a Name" (1983)
- "All You Pretty Girls" (1984)
- "This World Over" (1984)
- "The Mole from the Ministry" (1985, The Dukes of Stratosphear)
- "Grass" (1986)
- "Dear God" (1987)
- "The Meeting Place" (1987)
- "You're a Good Man Albert Brown (Curse You Red Barrel)" (1987, The Dukes of Stratosphear)
- "Spirit of the Forest" (1989) (featured guest)
- "Mayor of Simpleton" (1989)
- "King for a Day" (1989)
- "The Ballad of Peter Pumpkinhead" (1992)
- "The Disappointed" (1992)

The band were not allowed creative input for their music videos, except for "The Mole from the Ministry".

== Bibliography ==
- DeRogatis, Jim (2003). Turn on Your Mind: Four Decades of Great Psychedelic Rock. Hal Leonard Corporation. ISBN 978-0-634-05548-5.
- Farmer, Neville (1998). XTC: Song Stories: The Exclusive Authorized Story Behind the Music. London: Helter Skelter Publishing. ISBN 190092403X.
- Gimarc, George (2005). Punk Diary: The Ultimate Trainspotter's Guide to Underground Rock, 1970-1982. Backbeat Books. ISBN 978-0-87930-848-3.
- Myers, Paul (2010). A Wizard, a True Star: Todd Rundgren in the Studio. Jawbone Press. ISBN 978-1-906002-33-6.
- Partridge, Andy; Bernhardt, Todd (2016). Complicated Game: Inside the Songs of XTC. Jawbone Press. ISBN 978-1-908279-78-1.
- Rachel, Daniel (2014). The Art of Noise: Conversations with Great Songwriters. St. Martin's Press. ISBN 9781466865211.
- Twomey, Chris (1992). XTC: Chalkhills and Children. London: Omnibus Press. ISBN 9780711927582.
