= Life Begins at the Hop =

Single by XTC
- Released: April 1979
- Genre: New wave; power pop
- Length: 3:46
- Label: Virgin Records
- Songwriter: Colin Moulding
- Producer: Steve Lillywhite

XTC singles chronology
"Are You Receiving Me?" (1978)	"Life Begins at the Hop" (1979)	"Making Plans for Nigel" (1979)

Music video
- "Life Begins at the Hop" on YouTube

"Life Begins at the Hop" is a song written by Colin Moulding. It was recorded by XTC and released in 1979 as the group's fifth single. Keyboardist Barry Andrews was replaced by second guitarist Dave Gregory prior to its recording. The song recalls Friday night youth dances that Moulding, in his teenage years, had attended at St. Peter's Church in Penhill, Swindon.

The single's B-side, "Homo Safari" was the first in Andy Partridge's "Homo Safari Series", a six-part series of ambient, impressionistic instrumentals, initially released on the b-sides of various XTC 7" and 12" singles. The song would later be put on the 2014 expanded edition as a bonus track, alongside its A-side, which was also put on the album's original US release, as the opening track.

== Track listing ==
1. "Life Begins at the Hop" (Colin Moulding) – 3:46
2. "Homo Safari" (Andy Partridge) – 2:14

== Charts ==
Chart (1979)	Peak position
Australia (Kent Music Report)	94
UK Singles (Official Charts)	54
