= Terry Chambers =

English drummer

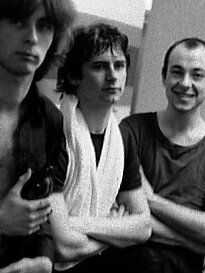
- Chambers (centre) in 1978

Background information
- Born: Terry Peter Chambers; 18 July 1955 (age 71); Swindon, Wiltshire, England
- Occupation: Drummer
- Instruments: Drums; percussion
- Years active: 1972–1985; 2017–present
- Label: Virgin
- Formerly of: XTC; Dragon; TC&I
- Website: EXTC – XTC's Terry Chambers and Friends

Terry Peter Chambers (born 18 July 1955) is an English drummer who was a member of the band XTC from 1972 to 1982 and the Australian–New Zealand group Dragon between 1983 and 1985. He appears on all of XTC's albums between White Music (1978) and Mummer (1983).

== Early life ==
Chambers was born in Swindon, Wiltshire. He originally wanted to learn to play the piano, but his parents could not afford to buy one. So instead he saved money from his Saturday job, stacking shelves at the local grocers, and at the age of 14 bought his first drum kit.

== Career ==
Chambers played on XTC's 3D - EP, White Music, Go 2, Drums and Wires, Black Sea, English Settlement, and live recordings, until his departure from the band during the 1982 sessions for Mummer. On Mummer he played on "Beating of Hearts", "Wonderland" and the B-side "Toys". Chambers's reasons for leaving the band included the band's decision to stop touring and performing live, as well his own plans with his Australian girlfriend, with whom he subsequently emigrated to New South Wales.

He became involved in session drumming while living in Australia as well as recording and touring with Dragon between late 1983 and mid 1985. He was featured on the studio album Body and the Beat (1984) and the live album and home video Live One (1985). He is also featured in the promotional video clips for the songs "Wilderworld", "Cry", "Magic" and "Rain".

Chambers returned to the UK in 2016 after meeting his old girlfriend Lynn Farrar. He recorded an EP with fellow ex-XTC member Colin Moulding, called Great Aspirations by TC&I, which was released in October 2017. Chambers formed EXTC with former TC&I bandmate (and Circu5 founder) Steve Tilling, performing classic XTC songs from the late 1970s and early 1980s.

EXTC - XTC's Terry Chambers and Friends are currently touring, alongside Terry, EXTC features frontman Steve Hampton (lead vocal & guitar - Joe Jackson & The Vapors) and Terry Lines (bass & vocals - The Rams and Dead Crow Road).
