= Colin Moulding =

English musician

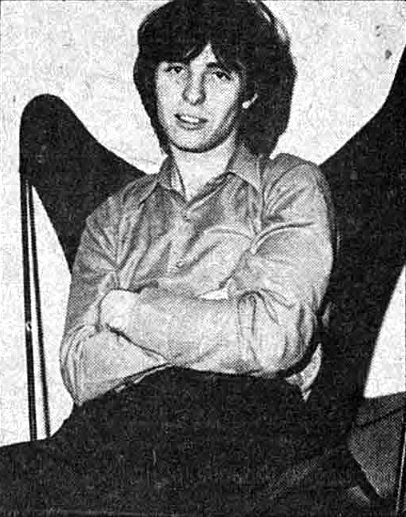
- Moulding in 1981

Background information
- Also known as: The Red Curtain, The Colonel
- Born: Colin Ivor Moulding; 17 August 1955 (age 71); Swindon, Wiltshire, England
- Genres: Rock; pop
- Occupations: Musician; songwriter; singer
- Instruments: Bass; vocals; guitar; keyboards
- Years active: 1972–present
- Labels: Cooking Vinyl; Geffen; Idea; Virgin
- Formerly of: XTC; The Dukes of Stratosphear; TC&I

Colin Ivor Moulding (born 17 August 1955) is an English bassist, singer, and songwriter who was one of the core members of the rock band XTC. Moulding wrote three of their earliest charting UK singles: "Life Begins at the Hop" (1979), "Making Plans for Nigel" (1979) and "Generals and Majors" (1980).

== Early life ==
Colin Moulding was born in Swindon on 17 August 1955 to working class parents. His father, Charlie, chiefly worked for British Rail and his mother, Vera, worked part-time as a laundry woman. Moulding has a brother, Graham, who is five years his senior. While his childhood was happy, he was described as being "painfully shy".

In 1970, Moulding heard "All Right Now" by Free, who became his favorite band and spurred him to take up the bass guitar. Moulding later said, "In my early teens I had pretty high hopes of doing something academic, but once I'd discovered music it all went out the window. I started growing my hair and got totally engrossed in the scene." His long hair eventually led to him being expelled from school. In 1972, he acquired a mustard-coloured Fender Jazz bass and met local drummer Terry Chambers, and the two would eventually form a short-lived band that played cover songs.

== Career ==
Moulding began jamming with another local musician, Andy Partridge, circa 1972–1973 and soon joined Partridge's band Star Park, convincing Partridge to hire Chambers as well. In July 1975, after a period in which the band were known as the Helium Kidz, they changed their name to XTC. Several of the band's early hits were penned by Moulding: 1979's "Life Begins at the Hop" was their first to chart in the UK, Australia and Canada; that same year, "Making Plans for Nigel", from the album Drums and Wires, became a Top 40 hit in the UK, Canada, Netherlands and New Zealand; "Generals and Majors", from 1980's Black Sea, became the band's first charting single in the US, reaching No. 28 in Billboard.

Outside of his work with XTC (and their alter-ego side project the Dukes of Stratosphear), Moulding released a solo single in 1980 under the pseudonym "The Colonel": "Too Many Cooks in the Kitchen" b/w "I Need Protection". The project came about after Moulding was dissatisfied that he hadn't been able to make a bigger contribution to Black Sea, due to time constraints. Moulding later said, "I was peeved at being hurried and I wanted to do something fun with a different band and girl backing singers." Since Moulding had penned several of XTC's hits, Virgin Records supported the solo project, but the single ultimately failed to chart.

In 1986, David Gilmour approached Moulding over becoming Pink Floyd's new bass player following Roger Waters' departure. He turned it down, as XTC were in the midst of recording Skylarking (1986).

He later played bass and co-produced one track on the 1994 Sam Phillips album Martinis and Bikinis. In 1995, Moulding contributed bass to several tracks of French band L'Affaire Louis' Trio's album L'Homme aux mille vies. In 2005, he contributed to Billy Sherwood's Pink Floyd tribute album Return to the Dark Side of the Moon, performing "Brain Damage" with Robby Krieger and Geoff Downes.

== After XTC ==
After releasing 14 albums, XTC disbanded in 2006. In February 2007, Partridge told music website Pitchfork that Moulding was "not interested in music any more, and doesn't want to write", which Moulding himself later confirmed.

In November 2008, he emerged for an interview about "Making Plans For Nigel" for an installment in the series of interviews by Todd Bernhardt. He gave a two-hour interview in December on the Todd Rundgren fansite, Rundgren Radio.

Moulding made vocal contributions to a Billy Sherwood progressive rock album (The Prog Collective, August 2012), combining with Rick Wakeman on "Check Point Karma". In 2012, he appeared on Sherwood's album Songs of the Century: An All-Star Tribute to Supertramp.

He performed a lead vocal for the song "The Man Who Died Two Times" from the album In Extremis by the progressive rock band Days Between Stations (released 15 May 2013) and appears in the video for the song, released in June 2014.

Moulding played bass on "High Noon", a track on Anton Barbeau's 2016 release Magic Act, and contributed vocals to the title track of Little World, a 2016 collaboration between Barbeau and Sacramento singer Allyson Seconds. Moulding also appeared in both the "High Noon" and "Little World" videos.

In 2017, Moulding and Chambers recorded an EP titled Great Aspirations that was credited to TC&I. It was released on 20 October 2017. In October and November 2018, TC&I, featuring Moulding, Chambers, Steve Tilling (from Circu5), Gary Bamford, Susannah Bevington and Moulding's son, Lee, played a series of six gigs at the Swindon Arts Centre. The sets consisted of a selection of Moulding's songs from XTC's career plus material from the TC&I EP and a cover of Andy Partridge's "Statue of Liberty". Highlights of the concerts were released in August 2019 on CD and in download format under the title Naked Flames: Live at Swindon Arts Centre.

He has since released his solo debut EP The Hardest Battle in 2021.

== Technique ==
Moulding is self-taught as a bass player and was learning rock riffs at the age of 15. He cites Andy Fraser of Free as an early musical influence, and has stated a preference for an intuitive approach to writing and playing rather than study. When writing songs, Moulding has used guitars and keyboards rather than the bass guitar.

== Personal life ==
In February 1974, Moulding married Carol Evans, whom he had been dating since March 1973. They have a son, Lee, born in June 1974, and a daughter, Joanne.

== Discography ==
Compositions for XTC/The Dukes of Stratosphear

- White Music (1978)
  - "Crosswires"
  - "Do What You Do"
  - "I'll Set Myself on Fire"
  - "Dance Band" (CD bonus track)
  - "Heatwave" (CD bonus track)
  - "Instant Tunes" (CD bonus track)
- Go 2 (1978)
  - "Buzzcity Talking"
  - "Crowded Room"
  - "The Rhythm"
  - "I Am the Audience"
- Drums and Wires (1979)
  - "Making Plans for Nigel"
  - "Day in Day Out"
  - "Ten Feet Tall"
  - "That Is the Way"
  - "Life Begins at the Hop" (CD bonus track)
  - "Limelight" (CD bonus track)
- Black Sea (1980)
  - "Generals and Majors"
  - "Love at First Sight"
  - "Smokeless Zone" (CD bonus track)
  - ”Ban the Bomb (CD bonus track)
- English Settlement (1982)
  - "Runaways"
  - "Ball and Chain"
  - "Fly on the Wall"
  - "English Roundabout"
- Mummer (1983)
  - "Wonderland"
  - "Deliver Us from the Elements"
  - "In Loving Memory of a Name"
- The Big Express (1984)
  - "Wake Up"
  - "I Remember the Sun"
  - "Washaway" (CD bonus track)
- 25 O'Clock (1985)
  - "What in the World??..."
- Skylarking (1986)
  - "Grass"
  - "The Meeting Place"
  - "Big Day"
  - "Dying"
  - "Sacrificial Bonfire"
- Psonic Psunspot (1987)
  - "Vanishing Girl"
  - "Shiny Cage"
  - "The Affiliated"
- Oranges and Lemons (1989)
  - "King for a Day"
  - "One of the Millions"
  - "Cynical Days"
- Nonsuch (1992)
  - "My Bird Performs"
  - "The Smartest Monkeys"
  - "War Dance"
  - "Bungalow"
  - "Didn't Hurt a Bit" (CD bonus track)
- Apple Venus Volume 1 (1999)
  - "Frivolous Tonight"
  - "Fruit Nut"
- Wasp Star (Apple Venus Volume 2) (2000)
  - "In Another Life"
  - "Boarded Up"
  - "Standing in for Joe"

Compilation album appearances

- Rag and Bone Buffet: Rare Cuts and Leftovers (1990)
  - "Ten Feet Tall" (US Single Version)
  - "Too Many Cooks in the Kitchen"
  - "Looking for Footprints"
  - "The World Is Full of Angry Young Men"
  - "I Need Protection"
  - "Officer Blue"
  - "Blame the Weather"
- A Testimonial Dinner: The Songs of XTC (1995)
  - "The Good Things"
- Coat of Many Cupboards (2002)
  - "Let's Have Fun"
  - "Sleepyheads"
  - "Find the Fox"
  - "Didn't Hurt a Bit"

Non-album XTC songs

- "Down a Peg"
- "Say It"
- "Skeletons"
- "Where Did the Ordinary People Go?"

Other studio album appearances

- Return to the Dark Side of the Moon (2006)
  - "Time" (with members of Yes, the Doors, Hurricane)
  - "Brain Damage" (with members of Yes/Asia, the Doors, the Mothers of Invention)
  - produced by Billy Sherwood
- Songs of the Century: An All-Star Tribute to Supertramp (2012)
  - "It's Raining Again" (with Geoff Downes)
  - produced by Billy Sherwood
- The Prog Collective (2012)
  - "Check Point Karma" (with Rick Wakeman)
  - "Check Point Karma" (instrumental)
  - produced by Billy Sherwood
- In Extremis by Days Between Stations (2013)
  - "The Man Who Died Two Times"
- Magic Act by Anton Barbeau (2016)
  - "High Noon" (bass)
- Little World by Allyson Seconds and Anton Barbeau (2016)
  - "Little World" (vocals)
- Great Aspirations by TC&I (2017)
  - "Scatter Me"
  - "Greatness (The Aspiration Song)"
  - "Kenny"
  - "Comrades of Pop"
- Naked Flames by TC&I (live album) (2019)

Solo

- "The Hardest Battle" / "Say It" (original demo) / "The Hardest Battle" (first exploratory demo) (2021)
