= Fossil Fuel: The XTC Singles 1977–92 =

Compilation album by XTC
- Released: September 1996
- Recorded: 1977–1991
- Genre: Alternative rock
- Length: 117:38
- Label: Virgin

XTC other chronology
A Testimonial Dinner: The Songs of XTC (1995)	Fossil Fuel: The XTC Singles 1977–92 (1996)	Upsy Daisy Assortment (1997)

Professional ratings
Review scores
Source	Rating
AllMusic	5/5 stars
Q	4/5 stars

Fossil Fuel: The XTC Singles 1977–92 is a compilation album by XTC released in 1996. It was their third such greatest hits album following 1982's Waxworks: Some Singles 1977-1982 and 1985's The Compact XTC. It collects all 31 of their Virgin Records UK singles in chronological order. It does not include their pseudonymous singles as "The Dukes of Stratosphear", "The Three Wise Men" or "The Colonel".

The two discs reflect their shift in popularity from Great Britain to the United States in the mid-1980s. Some of disc 1's tracks ("Making Plans for Nigel", "Sgt. Rock (Is Going to Help Me)", "Senses Working Overtime") were top-40 hits in their homeland while a handful of songs from disc 2 became popular on stateside college radio ("Dear God", "Mayor of Simpleton", "The Ballad of Peter Pumpkinhead").

The compilation closes out with "Wrapped in Grey", which had been released as the third single from 1992's Nonsuch and then quickly recalled and deleted by Virgin Records, an event which effectively ended XTC's association with the label.

It reached No. 33 on the UK Albums Chart.

== Track listing ==
All tracks are written by Andy Partridge, except where noted.

Disc 1
No.	Title	Writer(s)	Original album	Length
1.	"Science Friction"		3D EP (1977)	3:14
2.	"Statue of Liberty"		White Music (1978)	2:52
3.	"This Is Pop?"		White Music	2:40
4.	"Are You Receiving Me?"		Non-album single (1978)	3:04
5.	"Life Begins at the Hop"	Colin Moulding	Non-album single (1979)	3:47
6.	"Making Plans for Nigel"	Moulding	Drums and Wires (1979)	4:12
7.	"Ten Feet Tall"	Moulding	Drums and Wires	3:13
8.	"Wait Till Your Boat Goes Down"		Non-album single (1980)	4:20
9.	"Generals and Majors"	Moulding	Black Sea (1980)	3:41
10.	"Towers of London"		Black Sea	4:38
11.	"Sgt. Rock (Is Going to Help Me)"		Black Sea	3:36
12.	"Love at First Sight"	Moulding	Black Sea	3:07
13.	"Respectable Street"		Black Sea	3:07
14.	"Senses Working Overtime"		English Settlement (1982)	4:34
15.	"Ball and Chain"	Moulding	English Settlement	4:29
16.	"No Thugs in Our House"		English Settlement	5:10
Total length:				59:44

Disc 2
No.	Title	Writer(s)	Original album	Length
1.	"Great Fire"		Mummer (1983)	3:50
2.	"Wonderland"	Colin Moulding	Mummer	4:15
3.	"Love on a Farmboy's Wages"		Mummer	3:59
4.	"All You Pretty Girls"		The Big Express (1984)	3:59
5.	"This World Over"		The Big Express	4:45
6.	"Wake Up"	Moulding	The Big Express	3:40
7.	"Grass"	Moulding	Skylarking (1986)	2:42
8.	"The Meeting Place"	Moulding	Skylarking	3:13
9.	"Dear God"		Skylarking	3:37
10.	"Mayor of Simpleton"		Oranges & Lemons (1989)	3:57
11.	"King for a Day"	Moulding	Oranges & Lemons	3:36
12.	"The Loving"		Oranges & Lemons	3:54
13.	"The Disappointed"		Nonsuch (1992)	3:38
14.	"The Ballad of Peter Pumpkinhead"		Nonsuch	5:03
15.	"Wrapped in Grey"		Nonsuch	3:46
Total length:				57:54

== Charts ==
Chart performance for Fossil Fuel: The XTC Singles 1977–92
Chart (1996)	Peak position
Australian Albums (ARIA)	105
Canada Top Albums/CDs (RPM)	64
UK Albums (Official Charts)	33

== Certifications ==
Certifications for Fossil Fuel: The XTC Singles 1977–92
Region	Certification	Certified units/sales
United Kingdom (BPI)	Silver	60,000^{‡}
^{‡} Sales+streaming figures based on certification alone.
