= The Compact XTC =

The Compact XTC: The Singles 1978-1985

Greatest hits album by XTC
- Released: 1985
- Recorded: 1977–1984
- Genre: Rock
- Length: 68:33
- Label: Virgin
- Producer: John Leckie (tracks 1–2); Robert Lange (track 3); Martin Rushent (track 4); Steve Lillywhite (tracks 5–6, 8–10); Phil Wainman (track 7); Hugh Padgham and XTC (tracks 11–12); Bob Sargeant (track 13); XTC and Steve Nye (tracks 14–15); David Lord; XTC (tracks 16–18)

XTC other chronology
Beeswax: Some B-Sides 1977–1982 (1982)	The Compact XTC: The Singles 1978-1985 (1985)	Chips from the Chocolate Fireball (1987)

Professional ratings
Review scores
Source	Rating
AllMusic	4.5/5 stars

The Compact XTC: The Singles 1978–1985 is a singles compilation album by XTC originally issued in 1985. It replaced Waxworks: Some Singles 1977–1982 as a greatest hits album (and, bizarrely, used the same catalogue number in the UK and some other countries), adding six singles issued between English Settlement and The Big Express. It took advantage of the compact disc's greater storage capacity to limit it to a single disc. It was superseded by the double-disc set Fossil Fuel: The XTC Singles 1977–1992, on which all eighteen tracks appear.

Two UK Virgin Records singles are missing from this compilation: "Respectable Street" (1981) and "No Thugs in Our House" (1982), as well as "Take This Town" (1980) – an RSO Records released single issued from the soundtrack of the film "Times Square". 'International' singles missing are the re-recorded version of "Ten Feet Tall" (1980, North America) and "Love at First Sight" (1981, Canada).

== Track listing ==
=== UK CD: CDV 2251 ===
All songs written by Andy Partridge, except where noted.

1. "Science Friction" – 3:12 (1977) (from 3D EP)
2. "Statue of Liberty" – 2:24 (1978) (from White Music)
3. "This Is Pop?" – 2:39 [Re-recorded single version] (1978) (from White Music)
4. "Are You Receiving Me?" – 3:03 (1978)
5. "Life Begins at the Hop" (Colin Moulding) – 3:47 (1979)
6. "Making Plans for Nigel" (Moulding) – 3:53 [Single edit/fade used in some countries] (1979) (from Drums and Wires)
7. "Wait Till Your Boat Goes Down" – 4:34 [Long version; some 10 seconds longer than the edited single mix] (1980)
8. "Generals and Majors" (Moulding) – 3:42 [Single edit] (1980) (from Black Sea)
9. "Towers of London" – 4:38 [Single edit] (1980) (from Black Sea)
10. "Sgt. Rock (Is Going to Help Me)" – 3:36 [Single edit] (1980) (from Black Sea)
11. "Senses Working Overtime" – 4:33 [Single edit] (1982) (from English Settlement)
12. "Ball and Chain" (Moulding) – 4:30 (1982) (from English Settlement)
13. "Great Fire" – 3:45 (1983) (from Mummer)
14. "Wonderland (Moulding) – 4:02 [Single edit] (1983) (from Mummer)
15. "Love on a Farmboy's Wages" – 3:58 (1983) (from Mummer)
16. "All You Pretty Girls" – 3:56 [Long version; some 20 seconds longer than the album version] (1984) (from The Big Express)
17. "This World Over" – 4:43 [Single edit] (1984) (from The Big Express)
18. "Wake Up" (Moulding) – 3:40 [Single edit/fade] (1985) (from The Big Express)
