= Coat of Many Cupboards =

Box set by XTC
- Released: 25 March 2002
- Recorded: 1977–2001
- Genre: Pop rock
- Length: 220:01
- Label: Virgin

XTC other chronology
| Homegrown (2001) | Coat of Many Cupboards (2002) | Instruvenus (2002) |

Professional ratings
Review scores
| Source | Rating |
|---|---|
| Allmusic | link |
| BBC Online Music | (not rated) link |
| Pitchfork Media | (9.0/10) link |
| PopMatters | (not rated) link |
| Rolling Stone | (not rated) link |

Coat of Many Cupboards is a box set by English rock band XTC, released in 2002. It acts as an anthology of their 15 years on Virgin Records. It is their first compilation of any kind to include tracks by their alter-ego, the Dukes of Stratosphear.

The set includes demo versions, live recordings, rehearsal tapes and other rarities, as well as band favorites. 41 of the total 60 tracks had never been released before this compilation. The set also includes a 60-page booklet with an essay by Harrison Sherwood.

== Track listing ==
All songs written by Andy Partridge, except where otherwise noted.

=== Disc one ===
1. "Science Friction" [CBS Demo] – 3:32
2. "Spinning Top" [Live] – 3:00
3. "Traffic Light Rock" [Live] – 2:06
4. "Radios in Motion" [White Music Version] – 2:54
5. "Let's Have Fun" [White Music Outtake] (Colin Moulding) – 1:19
6. "Fireball XL5/Fireball Dub" [White Music Outtake] (Barry Gray) – 3:24
7. "Heatwave Mark 2 Deluxe" [White Music Outtake] (Moulding) – 1:47
8. "This Is Pop?" [Single Version] – 2:42
9. "Are You Receiving Me?" [Go 2 Outtake] – 3:23
10. "Things Fall to Bits" [Go 2 Outtake] (Barry Andrews) – 2:26
11. "Us Being Us" [Go 2 Outtake] – 2:55 (Andrews)
12. "Life Begins at the Hop" [First Rehearsal Extract] (Moulding) – 1:09
13. "Life Begins at the Hop" [First Recording, Unused] (Moulding) – 3:58
14. "Making Plans for Nigel" [Demo Version] (Moulding) – 4:15
15. "Ten Feet Tall" [Drums and Wires Version] (Moulding) – 3:14
16. "Sleepyheads" [Drums and Wires Outtake] (Moulding) – 4:52

=== Disc two ===
1. "Meccanic Dancing (Oh We Go)" [Live] – 2:34
2. "Atom Medley: Into the Atom Age/Hang on to the Night/Neon Shuffle" [Live] – 6:52
3. "Life Begins at the Hop" [Unused U.S. Single Recording] (Moulding) – 2:57
4. "Real by Reel" [Unused Single Recording] – 3:44
5. "When You're Near Me I Have Difficulty" [Unused Single Recording] – 3:21
6. "Helicopter" [Unused Single Recording] – 3:30
7. "Towers of London" [Rejected Single Recording] – 6:07
8. "Generals and Majors" [Rehearsal Tape, Demo Version] (Moulding) – 5:02
9. "No Language in Our Lungs" [Black Sea Version] – 4:51
10. "Sgt. Rock (Is Going to Help Me)" [Listed as the Black Sea Version, but is in fact the edited single version] – 3:37
11. "Paper and Iron (Notes and Coins)" [Live] – 4:08
12. "Crowded Room" [Live] (Moulding) – 4:03
13. "Senses Working Overtime" [Early Work Tape, Demo Version] – 3:31
14. "Snowman" [Live] – 5:06
15. "Ball and Chain" [Unused Single Recording] (Moulding) – 4:21

A track is hidden in the pregap of this CD: "Wanking Man" (Live Studio Chatter) – 1:37

=== Disc three ===
1. "Punch and Judy" [Unused Single Recording] – 2:35
2. "Fly on the Wall" [English Settlement Version] (Moulding) – 3:17
3. "Yacht Dance" [Live on the Old Grey Whistle Test, BBC TV] – 4:31
4. "Jason and the Argonauts" [English Settlement version] – 5:59
5. "Love on a Farmboy's Wages" [Home Demo] – 3:47
6. "Wonderland" [Home Demo] (Moulding) – 4:23
7. "Ladybird" [Mummer Version] – 4:36
8. "All You Pretty Girls" [Home Demo] – 4:13
9. "Wake Up" [Home Demo] (Moulding) – 4:12
10. "The Everyday Story of Smalltown" [The Big Express Version] – 4:13
11. "Grass" [Home Demo] (Moulding) – 2:55
12. "Let's Make a Den" [Home Demo] – 2:25
13. "The Meeting Place" [Home Demo] (Moulding) – 3:51
14. "Dear God" [Band Demo] – 4:10

A song is hidden in the pregap of this CD: "Shaving Brush Boogie" (Live Studio Recording) – 12:26

=== Disc four ===
1. "Brainiac's Daughter" [Psonic Psunspot Version] – 4:03
2. "Vanishing Girl" [Psonic Psunspot Version with alternate ending narration] (Moulding) – 2:44
3. "Terrorism" [Home Demo] – 3:20
4. "Find the Fox" [Home Demo] (Moulding) – 2:37
5. "Season Cycle" [Skylarking Version] – 3:21
6. "The Troubles" [Home Demo] – 3:17
7. "Mayor of Simpleton" [Early Work Tape, Demo] – 2:47
8. "King for a Day" [Home Demo] (Moulding) – 3:14
9. "Chalkhills and Children" [Oranges and Lemons Version] – 5:06
10. "The Ballad of Peter Pumpkinhead" [Home Demo] – 5:34
11. "Omnibus" [Nonsuch Version] – 3:20
12. "The Disappointed" [Home Demo] – 3:20
13. "Bungalow" [Nonsuch Version] (Moulding) – 2:49
14. "Didn't Hurt a Bit" [Nonsuch Outtake] (Moulding) – 3:54
15. "Books are Burning" [Live on The Late Show, BBC TV] – 4:48

== Personnel ==
XTC

- Andy Partridge – guitar, vocals, keyboards, acoustic guitar, bass guitar, percussion, guitar solo; all instruments & vocals (3.5, 3.8, 3.12, 4.3, 4.6–7, 4,10, 4.12)
- Colin Moulding – bass guitar, vocals, guitar, keyboards; all instruments & vocals (3.6, 3.9, 3.11, 3.13, 4.4, 4.8)
- Barry Andrews – keyboards (1.1-1.11), vocals (1.1-1.11)
- Terry Chambers – drums (1.1-1.16, 2.1–2.15, 3.1–3.4)
- Dave Gregory – guitar, piano, vocals, keyboards, mellotron, drum programming

Additional musicians

- Pete Phipps – drums (3.7, 3.10)
- Ian Gregory – drums (4.1–2)
- Prairie Prince – drums (4.5)
- Pat Mastelotto – drums (4.9)
- Dave Mattacks – drums (4.11, 4.13–15)
- Guy Barker – trumpet (4.11)

Technical

- Nicky Graham – producer (1.1)
- Newell Heeley – engineer (1.2~3)
- XTC – mixing (1.2–3, 1.5, 1.7, 1.16, 2.1–2, 2.7, 2.11–12, 2.14, 3.13, 4.8, 4.14), producers (1.14, 2.15, 3.1, 4.14)
- John Leckie – producer (1.4–7, 1.9–11, 4.1–2), engineer (1.9–11)
- Alan Douglas – engineer (1.4–7)
- Robert John "Mutt" Lange – producer (1.8)
- Andy Jackson – engineer (1.8)
- Steve Lillywhite – producer (1.14–16, 2.4–10)
- Hugh Padgham – engineer (1.14–16, 2.4–6, 2.9–10, 3.2, 3.4), producer (3.2, 3.4)
- Steve Warren – engineer (1.14)
- Keith Walker – engineer (2.1–2)
- Cameron Allan – producer (2.3)
- Phil Vinall – engineer (2.9–10)
- Chris Jenkins – engineer (2.11–12)
- Chris Blake – engineer (2.14)
- Clive Langer – producer (2.15, 3.1)
- Alan Winstanley – producer (2.15, 3.1), engineer (2.15, 3.1)
- John Caulfield – engineer (3.3)
- Andy Partridge – engineer (3.5, 3.8, 3.12, 4.3, 4.6, 4.7, 4.10, 4.12, 4.14)
- Colin Moulding – engineer (3.6, 3.9, 3.11, 3.13, 4.4, 4.8)
- Steve Nye – producer (3.7), engineer (3.7)
- Howard Gray – engineer (3.7)
- David Lord – producer (3.10)
- Glenn Tommey – engineer (3.10)
- Dave Gregory – engineer (3.14), mixing (3.14)
- John Cornfield – engineer (4.1–2)
- Todd Rundgren – producer (4.5)
- Paul Fox – producer (4.9)
- Ed Thacker – engineer (4.9)
- Gus Dudgeon – (4.11, 4.13–14)
- Barry Hammond – engineer (4.11, 4.13–14)
- Nick Davis – mixing (4.11)
- Andrew Swainson – cover, book art
- Ian Cooper – mastering
- Harrison Sherwood – essay
- Jason Day – project coordinator
- Greg Allen – photography
- Clive Arrowsmith – photography
- Allan Ballard – photography
- Paul Canty – photography
- Gavin Cochran – photography
- Douglas Brothers – photography
- Bernard Farrell – photography
- Jill Furmanovsky - photography
- B.C. Kagan – photography
- Andy Laine – photography
- Akiyoshi Miyashita – photography
- Dennis Morris – photography
- Cindy Palmano – photography
- Sheila Rock – photography
- Penny Smith – photography
- Kevin Westenberg – photography
- Irene Young – photography
- Smash Hits – photography
