= Waxworks: Some Singles 1977–1982 =

Compilation album by XTC
- Released: November 1982
- Recorded: 1977–1981
- Genre: Pop rock
- Length: 44:29
- Label: Virgin
- Producer: John Leckie; Robert John "Mutt" Lange; Martin Rushent; Steve Lillywhite; Phil Wainman; Hugh Padgham; XTC

XTC other chronology
Take Away/The Lure of Salvage (1980)	Waxworks: Some Singles 1977–1982 (1982)	Beeswax: Some B-Sides 1977–1982 (1982)

Professional ratings
Review scores
Source	Rating
AllMusic	4.5/5 stars

Waxworks: Some Singles 1977–1982 is the first compilation album by English rock band XTC, released in November 1982 by Virgin Records. Though it followed closely on the heels of the successful English Settlement album and its lead-off single "Senses Working Overtime", it failed to chart in the Top 40 in the UK. It was initially released shrinkwrapped with the Beeswax: Some B-Sides 1977–1982 compilation included as a "free bonus album".

== Critical reception ==
In a retrospective review for AllMusic, Chris Woodstra wrote that though Waxworks: Some Singles 1977–1982 has been replaced by more comprehensive XTC compilation albums later on, it "remains the classic compilation of the band's first, pre-studio-bound period."

== Track listing ==
All tracks are written by Andy Partridge, except where noted.

Side one
No.	Title	Writer(s)	Original release	Length
1.	"Science Friction"		Non-album single; 3D EP, 1977	3:12
2.	"Statue of Liberty"		White Music, 1978	2:24
3.	"This Is Pop?" (single version)		Non-album single, 1978; album version from White Music	2:39
4.	"Are You Receiving Me?"		Non-album single, 1978	3:03
5.	"Life Begins at the Hop"	Colin Moulding	Non-album single, 1979	3:45
6.	"Making Plans for Nigel"	Moulding	Drums and Wires, 1979	3:53
7.	"Wait Till Your Boat Goes Down"		Non-album single, 1980	4:34

Side two
No.	Title	Writer(s)	Original release	Length
1.	"Generals and Majors"	Moulding	Black Sea, 1980	3:42
2.	"Towers of London"		Black Sea	4:38
3.	"Sgt. Rock (Is Going to Help Me)"		Black Sea	3:36
4.	"Senses Working Overtime"		English Settlement, 1982	4:33
5.	"Ball and Chain"	Moulding	English Settlement	4:30

- Track 3 originally from White Music. It was rerecorded for the single release.
- Single versions/edits are used throughout (as opposed to the versions appearing on the respective albums).

== Personnel ==
XTC

- Andy Partridge – guitar, vocals
- Colin Moulding – bass, vocals
- Barry Andrews – keyboards (1–4)
- Terry Chambers – drums
- Dave Gregory – guitar, keyboards (5–12)

Technical

- John Leckie – producer (1, 2)
- Robert John "Mutt" Lange – producer (3)
- Martin Rushent – producer (4)
- Steve Lillywhite – producer (5, 6, 8–10)
- Phil Wainman – producer (7)
- Hugh Padgham – producer (11, 12)
- XTC – producer (11, 12)
- Tony Cousins – mastering

== Charts ==
Chart (1980)	Peak position
UK Albums Chart	54
