= Beeswax: Some B-Sides 1977–1982 =

Compilation album by XTC
- Released: November 1982
- Recorded: 1977–1981
- Genre: Pop rock
- Length: 39:56
- Label: Virgin

XTC other chronology
Waxworks: Some Singles 1977–1982 (1982)	Beeswax: Some B-Sides 1977–1982 (1982)	The Compact XTC (1985)

Professional ratings
Review scores
Source	Rating
AllMusic	3/5 stars
The Encyclopedia of Popular Music	2/5 stars
Spin Alternative Record Guide	3/10

Beeswax: Some B-Sides 1977–1982 is a compilation album by English rock band XTC, released in November 1982 by Virgin Records. It was initially released as a "free bonus album" shrinkwrapped with the A-side collection Waxworks: Some Singles 1977–1982.

== Critical reception ==
Trouser Press considered the album "not deathless music, but inventive as always and decidedly unpretentious." In a retrospective review, AllMusic felt that while XTC's B-sides were "often as engaging as the A-sides, their addition to the CDs as bonus tracks now makes this collection redundant."

== Track listing ==
All tracks are written by Andy Partridge, except where noted.

Side one
No.	Title	Writer(s)	Length
1.	"She's So Square" (from 3D EP, 1977)		3:06
2.	"Dance Band" (from 3D EP)	Colin Moulding	2:40
3.	"Hang On to the Night" (B-side of "Statue of Liberty", 1978)		2:12
4.	"Heatwave" (B-side of "This Is Pop?", 1978)	Moulding	2:09
5.	"Instant Tunes" (B-side of "Are You Receiving Me?", 1978)	Moulding	2:32
6.	"Pulsing Pulsing" (B-side of "Making Plans for Nigel", 1979)		1:37
7.	"Don't Lose Your Temper" (B-side of "Generals and Majors", 1980)		2:33
8.	"Smokeless Zone" (B-side of "Generals and Majors")	Moulding	3:50

Side two
No.	Title	Writer(s)	Length
9.	"The Somnambulist" (B-side of "Ten Feet Tall", 1979)		4:31
10.	"Blame the Weather" (B-side of "Senses Working Overtime", 1982)	Moulding	3:40
11.	"Tissue Tigers (The Arguers)" (B-side of "Senses Working Overtime")		3:57
12.	"Punch and Judy" (B-side of "Ball and Chain", 1982)		2:44
13.	"Heaven Is Paved With Broken Glass" (remix; originally from "Ball and Chain")		4:25

"Smokeless Zone" is the first song on Side two of the Canadian release.

== Personnel ==
XTC

- Andy Partridge – guitar, vocals
- Colin Moulding – bass, vocals
- Barry Andrews – keyboards (1–5)
- Terry Chambers – drums
- Dave Gregory – guitar, keyboards (6–13)

Technical

- John Leckie – producer, engineer (1–3, 5)
- Robert John "Mutt" Lange – producer (4)
- Steve Lillywhite – producer (6–8)
- Andy Partridge – producer (9), remix (13)
- Hugh Padgham – producer (10–13), engineer (6–8, 10–13)
- XTC – producer (10–13)
- Bill Price – engineer (4)
- Laurence Burrage – engineer (9)
- Tony Cousins – mastering
