= Rag and Bone Buffet: Rare Cuts and Leftovers =

Compilation album by XTC
- Released: 24 September 1990
- Recorded: 1977–1989
- Length: 78:29
- Label: Virgin Records

XTC other chronology
| Explode Together: The Dub Experiments 78-80 (1990) | Rag and Bone Buffet: Rare Cuts and Leftovers (1990) | BBC Radio 1 Live in Concert (1992) |

Professional ratings
Review scores
| Source | Rating |
|---|---|
| AllMusic | link |
| Robert Christgau | link |

Rag and Bone Buffet: Rare Cuts and Leftovers is a compilation album of songs by the English rock band XTC, released in 1990 by Virgin Records. It brings together single B-sides, BBC sessions, soundtrack contributions, the A- and B-sides of both a Christmas single released under the pseudonym the Three Wise Men and solo single recorded by Colin Moulding as the Colonel, as well as other obscurities.

== Background ==
In an XTC catalog included with their 1992 album Nonsuch, frontman Andy Partridge explained the genesis of the project:

"So the world goes urrph! grunt! shifts gears and in comes the new technology of compact discs. Suddenly someone says, but what about all those vinyl B-sides, pseudo-name singles, film tracks and giveaways that are going to be lost forever? Embarrassed that this is the only reason the Rag And Bone compilation exists, it then goes and gets great critical reviews. Sometimes I can't figure you folks out!"

== Track listing ==
Original release information adapted from CD liner notes.

All songs credited to XTC, unless otherwise indicated in parentheses.

All tracks are written by Andy Partridge, unless otherwise indicated.

| No. | Title | Writer(s) | Original release | Length |
|---|---|---|---|---|
| 1. | "Extrovert" | | B-side of "Grass" UK 12-inch | 3:35 |
| 2. | "Ten Feet Tall" | Colin Moulding | US single A-side | 3:12 |
| 3. | "Mermaid Smiled" | | Initial pressings of Skylarking | 2:26 |
| 4. | "Too Many Cooks in the Kitchen" (The Colonel) | Moulding | UK single A-side | 2:47 |
| 5. | "Respectable Street" | | UK single A-side with new lyrics | 3:05 |
| 6. | "Looking for Footprints" | Moulding | Free flexi disc with Flexipop UK magazine, issue No. 16 | 3:28 |
| 7. | "Over Rusty Water" | | B-side of "No Thugs in Our House" UK single | 1:28 |
| 8. | "Heaven Is Paved With Broken Glass" | | B-side of "Ball and Chain" UK single | 4:21 |
| 9. | "The World Is Full of Angry Young Men" | Moulding | B-side of "The Loving" UK 12-inch; Mummer outtake | 3:39 |
| 10. | "Punch and Judy" | | B-side of "Ball and Chain" UK single | 2:42 |
| 11. | "Thanks for Christmas" (The Three Wise Men) | Partridge; credited to Balthazar, Kaspar, Melchior | UK single A-side | 3:50 |
| 12. | "Tissue Tigers (The Arguers)" | | B-side of "Senses Working Overtime" UK single | 3:56 |
| 13. | "I Need Protection" (The Colonel) | Moulding | B-side of "Too Many Cooks in the Kitchen" UK single | 3:40 |
| 14. | "Another Satellite" (BBC Sunday Live Show, 22-2-87) | | B-side of "Dear God" UK 12-inch | 4:20 |
| 15. | "Strange Tales, Strange Tails" | | B-side of "Respectable Street" UK single; Go 2 outtake | 2:18 |
| 16. | "Officer Blue" | Moulding | B-side of "Respectable Street" UK single | 2:39 |
| 17. | "Scissor Man" (BBC Top Gear with John Peel, 8-10-79) | | B-side of "Towers of London" UK two-pack bonus single | 4:21 |
| 18. | "Cockpit Dance Mixture" | | B-side of "Ball and Chain" UK 12-inch | 6:02 |
| 19. | "Pulsing Pulsing" | | B-side of "Making Plans for Nigel" UK single | 1:35 |
| 20. | "Happy Families" | | She's Having a Baby soundtrack | 2:45 |
| 21. | "Countdown to Christmas Party Time" (The Three Wise Men) | Partridge; credited to Balthazar, Kaspar, Melchior | B-side of "Thanks for Christmas" UK single | 4:12 |
| 22. | "Blame the Weather" | Moulding | B-side of "Senses Working Overtime" UK single | 3:38 |
| 23. | "Take This Town" | | Times Square soundtrack | 4:08 |
| 24. | "The History of Rock 'n' Roll" | | Miniatures various artists compilation | 0:22 |

== Personnel ==
Credits adapted from CD liner notes, except where noted.

- Todd Rundgren – producer (1, 3)
- Phil Wainman – producer (2)
- Mick Glossop – producer (4, 13)
- Steve Lilywhite – producer (5, 19, 23)
- Hugh Padgham – engineer (5, 8, 10, 12, 18, 19, 22, 23), producer (8, 10, 12, 18, 22)
- John Leckie – producer (6, 15)
- XTC – producers (7–10, 12, 18, 20, 22, 23); producers (as "the Three Wise Men") (11, 21)
- Howard Gray – assistant engineer (8, 10, 18)
- David Lord (as "the Good Lord") – producer (11, 21)
- Martin Colley – producer (14)
- Jonathan Russle – producer (14)
- Fred Kay – engineer (14)
- Andy Partridge – producer (15), sleeve
- Colin Moulding – producer (16)
- Tony Wilson – producer (17)
- David Dade – engineer (17)
- Glen Tommey – engineer (20)
- Erica Wexler – backing vocals (21)
- The Clinic – sleeve
- Johnnie Rutter – photography
- Emma – bits
