= Upsy Daisy Assortment =

Compilation album by XTC
- Released: June 17, 1997
- Recorded: 1979–1991
- Genre: Pop rock
- Length: 75:27
- Label: Geffen Records

XTC other chronology
Fossil Fuel: The XTC Singles 1977–92 (1996)	Upsy Daisy Assortment (1997)	Transistor Blast: The Best of the BBC Sessions (1998)

Professional ratings
Review scores
Source	Rating
Allmusic	link
Robert Christgau	link
Fretplay	link
Pitchfork Media	8.6/10 link

Upsy Daisy Assortment is a U.S.-exclusive compilation by XTC, released after Geffen Records declined to distribute the 1996 double-disc Fossil Fuel: The XTC Singles 1977-1992.

It is perhaps their first compilation to be considered a Best of as it includes album tracks "Funk Pop a Roll", "Seagulls Screaming Kiss Her, Kiss Her", "Earn Enough for Us" and "Chalkhills and Children" in addition to their better-known singles.

The cover art is a reproduction of a vintage 1945 travel poster called "Holidays in Switzerland" by Donald Brun.

== Track listing ==
All songs written by Andy Partridge, except where noted.

1. "Life Begins at the Hop" (Colin Moulding) – 3:47
2. "Making Plans for Nigel" (Moulding) – 4:12
3. "Generals and Majors" (Moulding) – 3:41
4. "Respectable Street" – 3:07
5. "Senses Working Overtime" – 4:34
6. "Ball and Chain" (Moulding) – 4:29
7. "No Thugs in Our House" – 5:10
8. "Love on a Farmboy's Wages" – 3:59
9. "Funk Pop a Roll" – 3:14
10. "This World Over" – 4:45
11. "Seagulls Screaming Kiss Her Kiss Her" – 3:50
12. "Grass" (Moulding) – 2:42
13. "Dear God" – 3:37
14. "Earn Enough for Us" – 2:54
15. "Mayor of Simpleton" – 3:57
16. "King for a Day" (Moulding) – 3:36
17. "Chalkhills and Children" – 4:56
18. "The Disappointed" – 3:38
19. "The Ballad of Peter Pumpkinhead" – 5:03
