= Gated reverb =

Audio processing technique

Gated reverb on a snare drum, produced by a plugin.

Gated reverb or gated ambience is an audio processing technique that combines strong reverb and a noise gate that cuts the tail of the reverb. The effect is typically applied to recordings of drums (or live sound reinforcement of drums in a PA system) to make the hits sound powerful and "punchy" while keeping the overall mix sound clean and transparent.

1980s pop–inspired instrumental track with gated reverb on the snare.

As one of the more prominent effects in many British pop and rock songs of the 1980s, it was brought to mainstream attention in 1979 by the producer Steve Lillywhite and the engineer Hugh Padgham while they worked on Peter Gabriel's self-titled third solo album, after Phil Collins played drums without using cymbals at London's Townhouse Studios. The effect is most quintessentially demonstrated in Collins's hit song "In the Air Tonight".

Unlike many reverberation or delay effects, the gated reverb effect does not try to emulate any kind of reverb that occurs in nature. In addition to drums, the effect has occasionally been applied to vocals.

== History ==
Producer Steve Lillywhite claimed he first experimented with the "ambience thing" on drums during the recording of Siouxsie and the Banshees' album The Scream (1978), when drummer Kenny Morris played without using cymbals on several songs. Lillywhite explained to journalist John Robb: "When you listen, you can hear elements of this gated room sound, big compressed room sound that I did on the Banshees."

Gated reverb was prominently used for the snare drum by Japanese electronic music band Yellow Magic Orchestra (YMO) for the synth-pop songs "Computer Game / Firecracker" (1978) and "Behind the Mask" (1979), the latter composed by Ryuichi Sakamoto while Yukihiro Takahashi played the drums in both songs. The gated reverb effect on the snare drum was produced using a digital reverb unit.

Lillywhite also listed his production's work on Psychedelic Furs's single "Sister Europe" (1980); this was "all done before the Peter Gabriel album". Lillywhite recognized that the gated reverb drum sound really showed its head in that form during the recording of the Peter Gabriel album with engineer Hugh Padgham. Lillywhite and Padgham's work on Peter Gabriel 3 was bookended with their work on XTC's Drums and Wires (1979) and Black Sea (1980). In this period they perfected their technique on Terry Chambers' drums, which can be heard most distinctively on Black Sea (particularly the songs "Respectable Street", "Generals and Majors" and "Love at First Sight").

At Townhouse Studios in Shepherd's Bush, Lillywhite and Padgham famously applied gated reverb to Phil Collins' drum timbre when Collins played without using cymbals on Peter Gabriel's song "Intruder" at Gabriel's request, on Gabriel's eponymous third solo album. Padgham claimed he discovered the sound accidentally when he opened an overhead mic, intended to be used as a talkback channel, above Collins's drum set when the pair were working on the track. The microphone was heavily compressed as well as using a gate.

Collins then used gated reverb extensively, both in his solo work as well as working with other artists. He used it notably on his hit song "In the Air Tonight", produced by Collins and Padgham. Other examples from Collins' own music also include "Against All Odds (Take a Look at Me Now)", "I Don't Care Anymore", "I Wish It Would Rain Down", and "You'll Be in My Heart" and the Genesis songs "Mama" and "No Son of Mine".

Gated reverb was used on countless drum tracks during the 1980s, to the point that the sound became a defining characteristic of that decade's popular music.

In the 1990s, many bands went back to more natural sounding drums. American rock band Haim used gated reverb on Danielle Haim's drumming for their debut studio album Days Are Gone (2013). By 2018, several contemporary artists began incorporating the effect in some of their rhythm tracks including Lorde and Beyoncé.

== Methods of creation ==
=== Live room method ===
The oldest, most "natural" technique can be executed with minimal electronic processing. The steps for processing are as follows:

1. At least two microphones are set up: close mic(s) (to pick up the hit itself) and ambience mic(s) (to pick up ambient sound). Usually, there is also a stereo pair involved that captures the overhead stereo image or cymbals.
2. The whole drumset and all mics are placed in a very live room (i.e., one with huge amounts of reverberation and particularly early reflections from its walls, ceiling and floor).
3. High-gain compression is applied to ambience mic(s) to capture the quieter details of the reverb sound. (optional)
4. Ambience mic(s) are fed through a noise gate with separate external key input.
5. Close mic(s) are used as an external key for the noise gate.
6. Hold time of noise gate is set to half a second or so (this would be a real duration of hit sound), followed by a fast release time. This causes the gate to allow only the first half-second of reverb to pass through after each drum hit, before closing again.
7. close mic and ambience sounds are mixed to taste.

This results in a very live-sounding drum that is rapidly cut off with none of the overpowering secondary reflections associated with reverb.

=== Effects processor method ===
When using a hardware reverb unit, echo chamber or digital emulation of either, it is possible to replicate the classic scheme:

1. Whichever piece of the drum kit is getting the effect will need at least one microphone set up close to it. Ambient microphones are unnecessary but can be used if desired. The sound can be achieved in acoustically "live" or "dead" rooms, since all reverberation will be done inside the effects unit processor.
2. The close mic sound is fed to the reverberation unit, then optionally to a compressor, and then to the noise gate's signal input.
3. The same sound from the close mic is fed to the noise gate's key input.
4. The "wet" and "dry" sounds (which is to say the processed and unprocessed sounds, respectively) can be mixed to taste.

This setup does not require a "live room" to achieve the enhanced reverberation of the drum sound and therefore the effect can be reproduced at concerts without great difficulty.

=== Emulation method ===
Although the gated reverb effect was initially achieved using a combination of reverb and a noise gate, the version heard on most iconic 1980s recordings was produced using the AMS RMX16's NonLin2 algorithm, which emulated the effect with a shaped, nonlinear decay.
