= Explode Together: The Dub Experiments 78-80 =

Compilation album by XTC
- Released: 1990
- Recorded: 1978–1980
- Genre: Dub
- Length: 54:32
- Label: Virgin
- Producer: John Leckie

XTC other chronology
| Chips from the Chocolate Fireball (1987) | Explode Together: The Dub Experiments 78-80 (1990) | Rag and Bone Buffet: Rare Cuts and Leftovers (1990) |

Professional ratings
Review scores
| Source | Rating |
|---|---|
| Select | 1/5 medals |

Explode Together: The Dub Experiments 78-80 is a compilation of songs by English rock band XTC, released in 1990 by Virgin Records. It includes the Go+ EP (included with initial LP pressings of their second album, Go 2) as well as the Take Away / The Lure of Salvage LP (released by XTC frontman Andy Partridge as "Mr. Partridge"). Recorded during sessions on various breaks for the albums Drums and Wires (1979) and Black Sea (1980), the album consists of remixes of tracks recorded for the band's first three albums, with additional overdubs—and sometimes new vocals and lyrics—recorded by Partridge.

== Track listing ==
Track notes adapted from XTC: Song Stories (1998), by XTC and Neville Farmer.

All tracks are written by Andy Partridge, except where otherwise indicated.

Go+
| No. | Title | Dub mix of | Length |
|---|---|---|---|
| 1. | "Dance With Me, Germany" | "Meccanic Dancing (Oh We Go!)" | 3:31 |
| 2. | "Beat the Bible" | "Jumping in Gomorrah" | 2:20 |
| 3. | "A Dictionary of Modern Marriage" | "Battery Brides" | 2:40 |
| 4. | "Clap Clap Clap" (Colin Moulding) | "I Am the Audience" | 2:26 |
| 5. | "We Kill the Beast" (Moulding) | "The Rhythm" | 2:20 |

Take Away
| No. | Title | Dub mix of | Length |
|---|---|---|---|
| 6. | "Commerciality" | "Refrigeration Blues" | 3:07 |
| 7. | "The Day They Pulled the North Pole Down" (Partridge, Moulding) | "Heatwave" | 3:51 |
| 8. | "The Forgotten Language of Light" | "Millions" | 4:19 |
| 9. | "Steam Fist Futurist" | "Real by Reel" | 3:10 |
| 10. | "Shore Leave Ornithology (Another 1950)" (Partridge, Moulding) | "Pulsing Pulsing" | 5:34 |
| 11. | "Cairo" | "Homo Safari" | 1:52 |

The Lure of Salvage
| No. | Title | Dub mix of | Length |
|---|---|---|---|
| 12. | "The Rotary" | "Helicopter" | 3:20 |
| 13. | "Madhattan" (Partridge, Moulding) | "That Is the Way" | 3:17 |
| 14. | "I Sit in the Snow" | "Roads Girdle the Globe" | 3:14 |
| 15. | "Work Away Tokyo Day" (Partridge, Moulding) | "Red", "Day In Day Out" | 4:04 |
| 16. | "New Broom" (Partridge, Moulding) | "Making Plans for Nigel" | 5:27 |
