= A Testimonial Dinner: The Songs of XTC =

Compilation album by Various Artists
- Released: October 3, 1995
- Genre: Pop rock
- Length: 45:46
- Labels: Nectar Masters; Thirsty Ear

XTC other chronology
Drums and Wireless: BBC Radio Sessions 77-89 (1994)	A Testimonial Dinner: The Songs of XTC (1995)	Fossil Fuel: The XTC Singles 1977–92 (1996)

Professional ratings
Review scores
Source	Rating
AllMusic	4/5 stars
Q	1/5 stars

A Testimonial Dinner: The Songs of XTC is a 1995 tribute album, featuring a variety of artists covering songs from the British band XTC. Unusually, XTC make an appearance on their own tribute album under the pseudonym Terry and the Lovemen – their contribution, "The Good Things", is an outtake from their 1989 album Oranges & Lemons. The album also includes They Might Be Giants performing "25 O'Clock", a song by the XTC side-project the Dukes of Stratosphear.

== Track listing ==
All tracks are written by Andy Partridge except where noted.

No.	Title	Writer(s)	Performer	Length
1.	"Earn Enough for Us""		Freedy Johnston	3:29
2.	"Senses Working Overtime"		Spacehog	3:52
3.	"All You Pretty Girls"		Crash Test Dummies	4:15
4.	"Wake Up"	Colin Moulding	The Verve Pipe	4:04
5.	"Making Plans For Nigel"	Moulding	The Rembrandts	5:03
6.	"Dear God"		Sarah McLachlan	3:58
7.	"The Man Who Sailed Around His Soul"		Rubén Blades	4:53
8.	"Another Satellite"		P. Hux	4:20
9.	"25 O'Clock"		They Might Be Giants	4:05
10.	"The Good Things"	Moulding	Terry and the Lovemen	4:42
11.	"Statue of Liberty"		Joe Jackson	3:05
