= Sgt. Rock (Is Going to Help Me) =

Single by XTC

from the album Black Sea
- Released: 16 January 1981
- Recorded: 1980
- Studio: The Town House, London
- Genre: Pop
- Length: 3:57 (album version); 3:36 (single version)
- Label: Virgin
- Songwriter: Andy Partridge
- Producer: Steve Lillywhite

XTC singles chronology
"Take This Town" (1980)	"Sgt. Rock (Is Going to Help Me)" (1981)	"Respectable Street" (1981)

Official audio
- "Sgt. Rock (Is Going to Help Me)" on YouTube

Audio sample
- file; help

"Sgt. Rock (Is Going to Help Me)" is a song by the British band XTC. Written by frontman Andy Partridge, it was released as the band's 12th single, and the third single from their 1980 album Black Sea, in January 1981, charting in the UK Singles Chart at No. 16 on 21 February 1981, being XTC's biggest single chart success to that date. The song also reached the Irish Singles Chart, peaking at No. 20.

The song was recorded at The Town House in London in June 1980. The 7" single is packed with a poster, showing a Sgt. Rock comic. The song is featured on the compilation albums Waxworks: Some Singles 1977–1982, The Compact XTC, and Fossil Fuel: The XTC Singles 1977–92.

The band performed the song on Top of the Pops on 22 January 1981 and on the Saturday morning show Multi-Coloured Swap Shop on 21 February 1981.

Partridge has since expressed disdain with the song saying: "... [it] embarrasses the shit out of me. Of all the tunes that I've written, that made it to tape, this makes me cringe the worse. It's not the music, that's solid enough. All the instruments in the track mesh nicely enough, but the lyrical sentiment, oh dear. It was supposed to be ironic, you know, nerdy comic fan imagines two dimensional hero can help him with his unsuccessful chat up technique. It did not work. It just came out limply crap. Virgin insisted it be included in this set, otherwise I'd gladly erase it from our history. We all make mistakes".

== Track listing ==
1. "Sgt. Rock (Is Going to Help Me)" [single edit] (Andy Partridge) (3:36)
2. "Living Through Another Cuba" (Andy Partridge)/"Generals And Majors" (Colin Moulding) [live medley] (7:52)

== Personnel ==
- Terry Chambers – drums, vibraslap
- Dave Gregory – guitars
- Colin Moulding – vocals, Epiphone Newport bass
- Andy Partridge – vocals, guitar, synth

== Charts ==
Chart (1981)	Peak position
Irish Singles Chart	20
UK Singles Chart	16
