= Go 2 =

Studio album by XTC
- Released: 6 October 1978
- Recorded: August–September 1978
- Studio: Abbey Road (London)
- Genres: Power pop; post-punk
- Length: 40:47
- Label: Virgin
- Producer: John Leckie

XTC chronology
White Music (1978)	Go 2 (1978)	Drums and Wires (1979)

Singles from Go 2
- 1. "Are You Receiving Me?" Released: 27 October 1978

Go 2 is the second studio album by the English band XTC, released 6 October 1978 on Virgin Records. The United Kingdom version contained no singles, but the American and Canadian versions included the single "Are You Receiving Me?" released on 27 October 1978 along with a music video produced for the song.

It is the final XTC album to feature keyboardist Barry Andrews, who went on to form Shriekback.

== Background ==
By August 1978, XTC were prepared to record their follow-up to White Music. The band had contacted Brian Eno to produce after they learned that he was a fan, but he declined, telling them that they were good enough to produce themselves. Virgin rejected Eno's advice, and the group instead returned to Abbey Road with producer John Leckie. One of the album's tracks, "Battery Brides (Andy Paints Brian)", was written in tribute to Eno.

Keyboardist Barry Andrews appeared at the sessions with several original songs, but frontman Andy Partridge did not feel they were right for the band. Andrews began taking bassist Colin Moulding and drummer Terry Chambers out for drinks without inviting Partridge, allegedly in an attempt to take over the group. After most of Andrews' songs were dropped from the final track list, the keyboardist told journalists that he thought the band would "explode pretty soon".

An earlier version of "Are You Receiving Me?" was recorded during the Go 2 sessions and was later released on the 2005 boxed set Coat of Many Cupboards. Other outtakes from Go 2 include "Sargasso Bar", "Us Being Us", "Instant Tunes", "Looking for Footprints", "Things Fall to Bits" and "Strange Tales, Strange Tails".

== Packaging ==
The album's title was chosen in reference to the board game Go in order to continue the black-and-white colour scheme from White Music. The "2" was added by Andrews. Its cover was designed and executed by Hipgnosis, and the cover consists of an essay about how album covers are used to attract potential buyers of the album. On the first British pressings of the LP version of the Go 2 album, the track listing on the vinyl disc label mimicked the type style of the cover art. The label is crammed full of text. In some non-English speaking countries, the group shot that was featured on the album's inner sleeve in the UK was used instead as the album cover. The French 13-track album, including the bonus track "Are You Receiving Me?", was one of the releases that featured this sleeve. Yugoslavia was another country that issued this version of the sleeve.

The essay would change depending on the medium (vinyl or CD) and label (Virgin, Epic or Geffen) the album was released on. A separate essay was prepared for cassette editions in the UK.

== Release and Go+ ==
Go 2 was released in October 1978 to positive reviews and a number 21 chart peak. The initial 15,000 pressings of the album came with a bonus disc of five dub remixes entitled Go+. In 1990, these tracks were included on the compilation Explode Together: The Dub Experiments 78-80.

== Critical reception ==
Professional ratings
Review scores
Source	Rating
AllMusic	2/5 stars
Chicago Tribune	2.5/4 stars
Christgau's Record Guide	B−
Pitchfork	6.9/10
Q	2/5 stars
The Rolling Stone Album Guide	3/5 stars
Sounds	5/5 stars
Spin Alternative Record Guide	7/10

Like White Music, Go 2 was given praise in Sounds, Melody Maker, and the NME. The Nottingham Evening Post wrote that "there's a wider range of experimentation, less instrumental clutter and a hatful of unpredictable twists," and noted that the hooklines are "just as tricksily devastating."

== Track listing ==
Side one
No.	Title	Writer(s)	Length
1.	"Meccanik Dancing (Oh We Go!)"	Andy Partridge	2:36
2.	"Battery Brides (Andy Paints Brian)"	Partridge	4:37
3.	"Buzzcity Talking"	Colin Moulding	2:41
4.	"Crowded Room"	Moulding	2:53
5.	"The Rhythm"	Moulding	3:00
6.	"Red"	Partridge	3:02

Side two
No.	Title	Writer(s)	Length
1.	"Beatown"	Partridge	4:37
2.	"Life Is Good in the Greenhouse"	Partridge	4:41
3.	"Jumping in Gomorrah"	Partridge	2:04
4.	"My Weapon"	Barry Andrews	2:20
5.	"Super-Tuff"	Andrews	4:27
6.	"I Am the Audience"	Moulding	3:48

2001 remastered CD bonus track
No.	Title	Writer(s)	Length
13.	"Are You Receiving Me?"	Partridge	3:06

- CD issues prior to 2001 placed the bonus track between tracks 5 and 6 on side one of the album.

=== Go+ ===
Bonus EP included with initial LP pressings – later included on Explode Together: The Dub Experiments 78-80. Track notes adapted from XTC: Song Stories (1998), by XTC and Neville Farmer.

Side one
No.	Title	Writer(s)	Notes	Length
1.	"Dance With Me, Germany"	Partridge	Dub version of "Meccanik Dancing (Oh We Go!)"	3:17
2.	"Beat the Bible"	Partridge	Dub version of "Jumping in Gomorrah"	2:06

Side two
No.	Title	Writer(s)	Notes	Length
1.	"A Dictionary of Modern Marriage"	Partridge	Dub version of "Battery Brides (Andy Paints Brian)"	2:27
2.	"Clap Clap Clap"	Moulding	Dub version of "I Am the Audience"	2:17
3.	"We Kill the Beast"	Moulding	Dub version of "The Rhythm"	2:05

== Personnel ==
XTC

- Andy Partridge – guitars and vocals
- Colin Moulding – bass and vocals
- Barry Andrews – Crumar organ, Farfisa organ, Wurlitzer electric piano, Minimoog, Clavinet, grand piano, vocals and saxophone
- Terry Chambers – drums and vocals

Additional personnel

- John Leckie – production/engineering
- Martin Rushent – associate production (uncredited)
- Haydn Bendall – engineering assistance (Abbey Road unit)
- Pete James – assistant engineer (Abbey Road unit)
- Andy Llewelyn – engineering assistance (Matrix unit)
- Jess Sutcliffe – engineering assistance (Matrix unit)
- Dave Eagle – photography
- Hipgnosis – cover artwork

== Charts ==
Chart (1978)	Peak position
Australia (Kent Music Report)	93
United Kingdom (Official Charts Company)	21
