= Black Sea (XTC album) =

Studio album by XTC
- Released: 12 September 1980
- Recorded: June–July 1980
- Studios: The Town House, London
- Genres: Pop; pop rock; art pop; new wave; post-punk
- Length: 48:39
- Label: Virgin
- Producer: Steve Lillywhite

XTC chronology
| Drums and Wires (1979) | Black Sea (1980) | English Settlement (1982) |

Singles from Black Sea
- 1. "Generals and Majors" Released: 9 August 1980; 2. "Towers of London" Released: 10 October 1980; 3. "Sgt. Rock (Is Going to Help Me)" Released: 16 January 1981; 4. "Respectable Street" Released: 13 March 1981; 5. "Love At First Sight" Released: 1981 (Canada)

Black Sea is the fourth studio album by the English rock band XTC, released 12 September 1980 on Virgin Records. It is the follow-up to the previous year's Drums and Wires, building upon its focus on guitars and expansive-sounding drums, but with more economical arrangements written with the band's subsequent concert performances in mind, avoiding overdubs unless they could be performed live.

Like Drums and Wires, Black Sea was recorded at Virgin's Town House studio in London with producer Steve Lillywhite and engineer Hugh Padgham. It was originally titled Work Under Pressure in reference to XTC's grueling touring and recording regimen. After their manager complained, frontman Andy Partridge devised Black Sea as a reference to his emotional state while composing the album. From 1980 to 1981, the band supported the album on tour as the opening act for the Police. His fatigue worsened and XTC ceased touring indefinitely by 1982.

Black Sea was critically acclaimed and remains XTC's second-highest charting British album, placing at number 16 on the UK Albums Chart, as well as their most successful US album, peaking at number 41 on the Billboard 200. It spawned three UK top 40 singles: "Generals and Majors" (number 32), "Towers of London" (number 31), and "Sgt. Rock (Is Going to Help Me)" (number 16). Another single, "Respectable Street", was banned from BBC radio due to its references to abortion and a "Sony Entertainment Centre".

== Background ==
In August 1979, XTC released their third LP Drums and Wires, a more pop-oriented venture than the previous Go 2 (1978). It was met with positive reviews and a number 34 chart peak. Bassist Colin Moulding's dissatisfaction with XTC's "quirky" reputation inspired the group to take a more accessible approach with the album. In his recollection, "Up until that point, we were viewed as a poor man’s Talking Heads or something ... when we came out with Drums and Wires it was like a different band, really." Lead single "Making Plans for Nigel" went further to propel the band's popularity, with every date of their proceeding UK tour sold-out. They still felt that they were not "fashionable" in England. The LP sold particularly well in Canada and other parts of the world, but in England, sales were at a minimal improvement from their previous records.

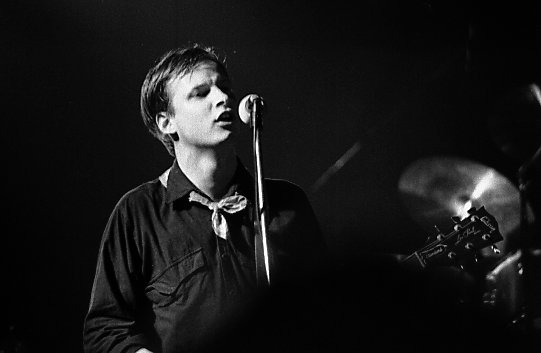
Frontman Andy Partridge performing with XTC in Toronto, February 1980

Frontman Andy Partridge sensed that he was losing the band's leadership, partly due to Moulding providing all of their charting singles to date and the resultant favouritism attracted from their label Virgin Records. He attempted to exert more authority in the group, later calling himself "a very benevolent dictator." Guitarist Dave Gregory disagreed, recalling that the band was "pretty tired" and that Partridge "could be a little bit of a bully." Moulding offered: "Virgin wanted a quick follow-up to 'Nigel.' I felt pressured but Andy was champing at the bit to redress the balance and prove that he could write a chart hit, too." To follow "Nigel", the band recorded Partridge's "Wait Till Your Boat Goes Down" with production by Phil Wainman of Bay City Rollers fame. Partridge thought of the song as the band's "Hey Jude" and expected that it would catapult the group's successes. Instead, it was their lowest-selling single to date.

Between late 1979 and early 1980, the members spent a significant amount of time on tour, making stops in Japan, Britain, mainland Europe and the United States, while also writing the songs that would form Black Sea. The group played gigs almost six nights a week for two months, an arrangement that Partridge said turned him into a "vegetable" and made him believe he "cracked up in a minor sort of way." During one of their performances, he suffered a brief memory lapse, forgetting XTC's songs as well as his own identity. Meanwhile, he released the side LP Take Away / The Lure of Salvage, Gregory played on Peter Gabriel's Melt, whilst Moulding and Chambers recorded singles under the moniker "the Colonel" with producer Mick Glossop. The band also contributed the song "Take This Town" to the 1980 film Times Square.

== Production and style ==
As with Drums and Wires, Black Sea was recorded at Virgin's The Town House studio in London with producer Steve Lillywhite and engineer Hugh Padgham. The team were asked to return for the recording of "Take This Town". Partridge remembered seeing "how Steve and Hugh had progressed" after working with Peter Gabriel and developing their signature gated reverb drum sound: "I think they developed a few interesting new techniques and there was a new toughness to our recordings." By comparison, the experience with Wainman proved unsatisfactory. The original intention was for XTC to produce themselves, but Virgin did not allow them to.

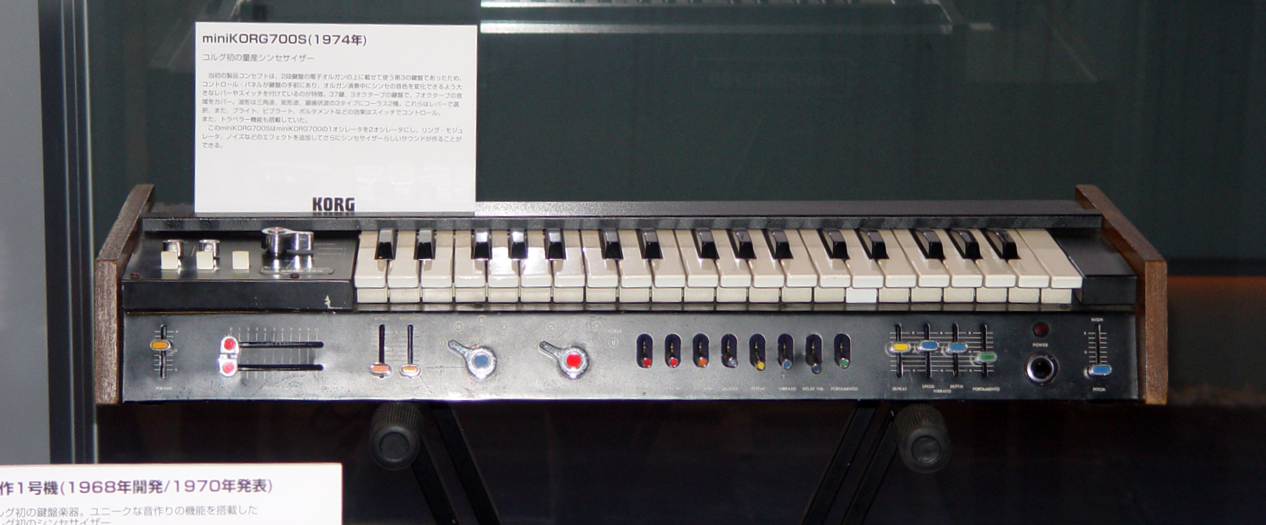
The band used a Korg monophonic synthesizer for additional textures

Partridge described the production as taking "Drums and Wires to the Nth degree ... The drums got boomier and bigger and more gated and more aggressive, and the guitars got slashier, with more punch to them." Gregory attributed the band's tighter sound to their 18 months touring Drums and Wires, which strengthened "our performance muscles." Moulding added that, in that time, Gregory's 1960s influences was starting to revitalize the band's interest in the music of that era. Gregory said the band had simplified into a "beat" group, with songs less elaborate than the ones recorded for Drums and Wires. Partridge imposed the rule that no overdubs should be recorded unless they can be performed live.

Black Sea was recorded in six weeks, longer than Drums and Wires, during which time the band resided on an upper floor of the studio. Moulding said it was a "Real luxury—bare box rooms with a bed and carpet." Gregory did not enjoy the recording experience due to his disappointment in himself as a non-contributing songwriter, his diabetes, and his uncomfortable working relationship with Partridge. As Gregory explained, "He's not a very giving musician when it's his song you're recording. ... I was incredibly frustrated during the sessions and then it was just tour, tour, tour." Commenting on how their playing styles intersected, Partridge said: "Dave and I worked to not tread on each other's toes musically, so we played in the holes left by the other." Gregory played "the more complicated parts" due to Partridge's consideration for live performances: "I was a stickler for it sounding as close to the record as we could get it. So, if I had to do the vocals, I usually gave myself a simpler part that I could play and sing with."

== Songs ==
"Respectable Street" was lyrically inspired by Partridge's observations of Bowood Road, a Swindon street that was diagonally opposite to where he lived at the time, as well as a next-door neighbour nicknamed "Mrs. Washing". Once the song was finished, he realised that there "couldn't be any other nation I'm talking about" besides England, and appended an old-fashioned Noël Coward-style intro that was then repurposed for the bridge section.

"Generals and Majors" was written by Moulding as a satirical take on the phrase "oh, what a lovely war". The song was Moulding's attempt at a composition with one chord, inspired by the Beatles' "Doctor Robert" and "Paperback Writer", while the guitar riff was supplied by Partridge. Chambers played a disco drumbeat.

"Living Through Another Cuba", a live favourite of the band's, is about Partridge's fears of the Cold War and Britain’s downplayed role in it. “It was total nuclear-war paranoia. That, and the uselessness of England – this completely and utterly useless little country whose significance in the world ended at the First World War.”

"Towers of London" is a tribute to the workers who constructed Victorian era London. It is one of the few XTC songs that modulates key, which was unintentional, and one of the few XTC recordings that necessitated an edit on Chambers' drum performance. The music stemmed from Partridge "subconsciously" trying to rewrite the Beatles' "Rain", desiring "clangorous guitars crashing together, and sort of droning." At the beginning of the recording, Lillywhite is heard saying "take-a-hundred-and-three", followed by the same phrase echoed by Chambers and Partridge, who are imitating the voice of Ian Reid. This was one of the band's running jokes during sessions.

"Sgt. Rock (Is Going to Help Me)" is a lyrical throwback to the group's earlier songs when they were known as the Helium Kidz. It was considered "the most irrelevant song on the album" by Partridge. He explained: "I wrote it as a bit of fun, rehearsed it and started to think, 'Why did I write this?' Then the record company go, 'Brilliant, it's a single.' I wish I hadn't written it, this is crass but not enjoyably crass."

"Travels in Nihilon", the album's closing track, is about Partridge's feelings of disillusionment with the music industry. The song (and album) ends with the sound of a shower running, meant to mimic the sound of rain falling, but someone told Partridge they thought it instead sounded like someone urinating, which he liked even more as he thought it fit with the song's lyrical theme of "the Pop industry, the fashion industry, the religion industry -- pissing on you, in contempt, for being such a dolt and buying into all their shit!"

== Title and packaging ==
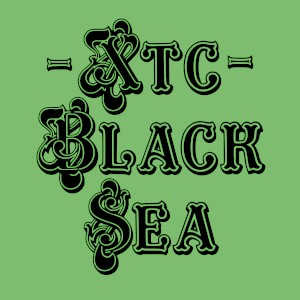
Outer cover of the US edition

The band wanted the album's cover design to be a marked contrast from Drums and Wires. One of the potential titles for the LP—had drummer Terry Chambers agreed to pose in a Lurex tuxedo for the album cover—was Terry and the Lovemen. Late in production, the title was changed to Work Under Pressure, before being vetoed by manager Ian Reid, who felt the title reflected negatively on him. In Japan, the album was initially advertised under this title. Later, XTC appropriated the title "Terry and the Lovemen" as their pseudonym on the tribute album A Testimonial Dinner: The Songs of XTC (1995).

The album cover features a photograph of the band, wearing antique diving suits, in front of a nautical painting by Ken White, after a sketch by Partridge, created especially for the project. A flying sea bird, ship's mast, and waning moon spell out the letters "XTC".

Black Sea was ultimately chosen to fit the nautical theme and to express the feelings of claustrophobia that Partridge felt at the time. He said his state of mind "was very black. People were buying copies of Sandy Lesberg's Violence in Our Time and leaving them ... strewn around the studio ... It's just the worst photographs you could ever imagine in one book: Belsen, child molestations, murders." Early copies of the UK, US and Australian editions of the LP came with the sleeve enclosed in a sea-green paper bag.

== Release ==
=== Sales and promotion ===
Released on 12 September 1980, Black Sea sold moderately, with 7 weeks spent on the UK album charts and a number 16 peak. In the US, the album spent 24 weeks on the Billboard 200 album charts and reached its peak position of number 41 in February 1981. Virgin's marketing department found Black Sea difficult to promote, and so publicity campaigns were split between "serious" national media, the independent music press, and schoolgirl-oriented magazines. Partridge remembered that the label "wanted us to be the power-pop teen dream thing."

Several singles were issued, including the UK top 40 hits "Generals and Majors" (number 32), "Towers of London" (number 31) and "Sgt. Rock (Is Going to Help Me)" (number 16). "Sgt. Rock" elicited feminist hate-mail for the lyric "keep her stood in line". The band performed the song on the BBC children's programme Multi-Coloured Swap Shop, where Partridge gave away his acoustic guitar. "Respectable Street" was banned from BBC radio due to its references to abortion and a "Sony Entertainment Centre". "Love at First Sight" was issued exclusively in Canada.

Music videos were filmed for "Towers of London", "Generals and Majors" and "Respectable Street". "Towers of London" was initially the lead single, but after filming the video, Virgin changed plans and decided to issue "Generals and Majors" first. On 10 October 1980, BBC-2 premiered the documentary XTC at the Manor. It largely featured the group at The Manor Studio for a faked studio session of "Towers of London". During its filming, the band voiced their concerns with having no video for "Generals and Majors". In response, Virgin owner Richard Branson rented war uniforms and organized a makeshift video featuring himself, his friends and the band. Partridge called it "the worst video ever made by man."

=== Touring ===
From 1980 to 1981, XTC toured Australia, New Zealand and the US as the opening act for the Police. They did two tours with the group, one in the summer and another in the autumn. Todd Rundgren attended a date in Chicago, and Robert Stigwood met XTC backstage at The Ritz in New York, telling them they were the most exciting live band he had seen since the Who. In Athens, Georgia, XTC were supported by local band R.E.M., who covered XTC songs in their set. The night after John Lennon was killed, XTC played a gig at Liverpool, where they performed both "Towers of London" and "Rain" in tribute to the Beatles.

At this point, XTC were playing in arena stadiums while Partridge, encumbered by XTC's touring regimen, began declining further in his mental state. While in upstate New York in December 1980, Partridge exited the tour van to relieve himself: "I jumped out of the van and wandered into this field ... and I thought, 'Who am I? Who the hell am I, and what am I doing in this field?' And just got back in the van, not knowing who I was." He requested to cease touring, but was opposed by Virgin, his bandmates and the band's management. On 2 June 1981, XTC performed their last ever British date, in Cardiff. In 1982, "Respectable Street" was the only song they performed at a televised gig simulcast in Paris, which became one of the last live performances of their career. Partridge experienced a panic attack mid-performance and walked off the stage.

== Critical reception ==
=== Contemporary ===
Contemporary professional ratings
Review scores
| Source | Rating |
|---|---|
| Rolling Stone | 3/5 stars |
| Smash Hits | 9/10 |
| Sounds | 5/5 stars |

Black Sea received critical acclaim. An unnamed Billboard reviewer deemed the album "consistently appealing and more accessible than [Drums and Wires]. The vocals of Andy Partridge and Colin Moulding have an attractive breeziness and the instrumentation is tight." In Musician, Roy Trakin wrote of XTC as among "the new English art rock" and praised Black Sea's successful fusion of "Partridge's love of rhythm and Moulding's affinity for melody ... Songs like 'Towers of London' and 'Burning With Optimism's Flames' show the two approaches finally achieving a seamless synthesis."

Writing for Rolling Stone, Don Shewey of Rolling Stone found Black Sea to be overall consistent—with the exception of "Travels in Nihilon", which he wrote "strays from the intersection of punk and pop where XTC are most at home". Jeff Tamarkin of CMJ New Music Report described the album as a refinement on Drums and Wires with "superb production, musicianship and writing", although he expressed disappointment towards the lack of Moulding songs. He predicted the band would "find itself with an even wider audience, because there's plenty here to satisfy even the most timid radio programmer and borderline rock dance club DJ."

According to biographer Chris Twomey, detractors of the record thought that its "complex musical nuts and bolts [were] too arty or too clever for their own good." Michael Kremen of The Michigan Daily reviewed that the songs "no longer sound fresh. I hear too many bits and pieces from their previous records as well as a lots of White Album and Abbey Road-era Beatles stuff. Perhaps, having influenced lots of bands over the last three years, that which once seemed unique in XTC is now fairly common."

=== Retrospective ===
Retrospective professional ratings
Review scores
| Source | Rating |
|---|---|
| AllMusic | 4.5/5 stars |
| Chicago Tribune | 4/4 stars |
| Christgau's Record Guide | B+ |
| Classic Rock | 9/10 |
| Mojo | 4/5 stars |
| Pitchfork | 9.2/10 |
| Q | 4/5 stars |
| Record Collector | 5/5 stars |
| The Rolling Stone Album Guide | 4/5 stars |
| Spin Alternative Record Guide | 6/10 |

The Chicago Tribune's Greg Kot said the album marked "the end of an era with an exclamation point. From here on out, the band's writing would become even more complex and personalized." AllMusic's Chris Woodstra called it XTC's most consistent album yet, both in terms of its full arrangements and unsubtle political commentary. Oregano Rathbone of Record Collector wrote that Black Sea was arguably "the sweet spot in XTC's imperial phase as a perma-touring four-piece experimental pop group." David Sinclair, in an overview of XTC's early albums for Q, determined that the arrangements of Black Sea, while complex, were much cleaner than earlier arrangements, such as those found on their debut, White Music. In 1996, critic Jack Rabid praised the "sardonic crack" of "Respectable Street" and wrote "am I the only one who's noticed that super-fans Blur have ripped this song off three times already???!!!!"

Writing for Pitchfork, Chris Dahlen highlights "Sgt. Rock" ("... will never vacate your brain"), "Rocket From a Bottle" ("one of their most jet-fueled songs"), and "Travels in Nihilon" ("one of their strangest"). He also appreciated the placement of the bonus tracks on the 2001 CD reissue, following the original track listing of the album. Previous reissues placed the tracks in the middle of the album, interrupting the "flow". Robert Christgau was impressed by the album's pacing and eclecticism, despite delving into excessively "embellishing herkyjerk whozis" and over-intellect.

== Track listing ==
All tracks are written by Andy Partridge, except where noted.

Side one
| No. | Title | Writer(s) | Length |
|---|---|---|---|
| 1. | "Respectable Street" | | 3:37 |
| 2. | "Generals and Majors" | Colin Moulding | 4:04 |
| 3. | "Living Through Another Cuba" | | 4:45 |
| 4. | "Love at First Sight" | Moulding | 3:06 |
| 5. | "Rocket from a Bottle" | | 3:30 |
| 6. | "No Language in Our Lungs" | | 4:52 |

Side two
| No. | Title | Length |
|---|---|---|
| 1. | "Towers of London" | 5:24 |
| 2. | "Paper and Iron (Notes and Coins)" | 4:14 |
| 3. | "Burning with Optimism's Flames" | 4:15 |
| 4. | "Sgt. Rock (Is Going to Help Me)" | 3:56 |
| 5. | "Travels in Nihilon" | 6:56 |
| Total length: | | 48:56 |

2001 CD bonus tracks
| No. | Title | Writer(s) | Length |
|---|---|---|---|
| 12. | "Smokeless Zone" | Moulding | 3:51 |
| 13. | "Don't Lose Your Temper" | | 2:33 |
| 14. | "The Somnambulist" | | 4:38 |

2017 CD bonus tracks (Steven Wilson remixes)
| No. | Title | Writer(s) | Length |
|---|---|---|---|
| 12. | "Respectable Street (Single Version)" | | 3:08 |
| 13. | "Smokeless Zone" | Colin Moulding | 3:50 |
| 14. | "Don't Lose Your Temper" | | 2:32 |
| 15. | "Take This Town" | | 4:09 |
| 16. | "Ban the Bomb" | Moulding | 2:40 |
| 17. | "Towers of London (Early Version)" | | 6:11 |
| 18. | "The Somnambulist" | | 4:38 |
| 19. | "History of Rock 'n' Roll - Andy Partridge (Solo)" | | 0:21 |

== Personnel ==
Credits adapted from the album's liner notes.

XTC

- Andy Partridge – vocals, guitar, synth
- Colin Moulding – vocals, Epiphone Newport bass
- Dave Gregory – guitars, synth, piano, vox humana
- Terry Chambers – Tama drums, Tama Snyper drum synthesiser, free form vocals

Additional personnel

- Step Lang – humming on "Generals and Majors"

Technical

- Steve Lillywhite – producer
- Hugh Padgham – engineer and mixer
- Nick Launay – tape op
- Phil Vinnal – tape op
- Ken White – sleeve backdrop
- Ralph Hall – photography

== Charts ==
| Chart (1980) | Peak position |
|---|---|
| Australia (Kent Music Report) | 27 |
| UK Albums Chart | 16 |
| US Billboard 200 | 41 |
| New Zealand Albums Chart | 1 |
