= English Settlement =

- One variation of the cover; other versions have the album's title and band name in green text, other versions do not list either.

Studio album by XTC
- Released: 12 February 1982
- Recorded: October–November 1981
- Studio: The Manor (Oxfordshire)
- Genre: Pop; new wave
- Length: 72:22
- Label: Virgin
- Producer: Hugh Padgham, XTC

XTC chronology
Black Sea (1980)	English Settlement (1982)	Mummer (1983)

Singles from English Settlement
- 1. "Senses Working Overtime" Released: 8 January 1982; 2. "Ball and Chain" Released: 26 February 1982; 3. "No Thugs in Our House" Released: 14 May 1982

English Settlement is the fifth studio album and first double album by the English rock band XTC, released 12 February 1982 on Virgin Records. It marked a turn towards the more pastoral pop songs that would dominate later XTC releases, with an emphasis on acoustic guitar, 12-string electric guitar and fretless bass. In some countries, the album was released as a single LP with five tracks deleted. The title refers to the Uffington White Horse depicted on the cover, to the "settlement" of viewpoints, and to the Englishness that the band felt they "settled" into the record.

XTC recorded the album at The Manor Studio in Oxfordshire with producer Hugh Padgham, the engineer of their previous two LPs. Compared to the band's previous releases, English Settlement showcased more complex and intricate arrangements, lengthier songs, lyrics that covered broader social issues, and a wider range of music styles. Principal songwriter Andy Partridge was fatigued by the grueling touring regimen imposed by their label and management, and believed that pursuing a sound less suited for live performance would relieve the pressure to tour. Three singles were issued from the album: "Senses Working Overtime", "Ball and Chain" and "No Thugs in Our House".

English Settlement was well-received critically and continues to be regarded by many critics as XTC's finest album. It reached number 5 on the UK Album Chart during an 11-week stay, making it the band's only top ten album in the UK. It also reached number 48 on the US Billboard 200 during a 20-week stay. An international tour was scheduled in support of the album, but it was canceled after several dates due to Partridge's worsening exhaustion. XTC's popularity in the UK faltered, and for the rest of their career, they remained a studio-only band. In 2002, English Settlement was ranked number 46 on Pitchfork's list of "The Top 100 Albums of the 1980s".

== Background ==
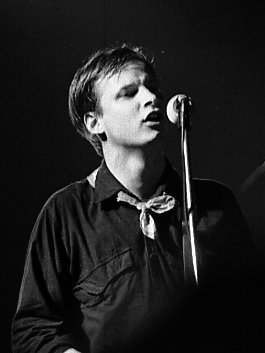
Frontman Andy Partridge performing with XTC, 1980

By the early 1980s, XTC—and particularly frontman Andy Partridge—were fatigued from their grueling touring regimen. During one performance on their 1979–1980 Drums and Wires tour, Partridge suffered momentary amnesia, forgetting XTC's songs as well as his own identity. Once the tour was done, they had only a few weeks to write their fourth album, Black Sea. It was released in September 1980 to critical acclaim and peaked at number 16 in the UK and number 41 in the US. The album's arrangements were written with the band's subsequent concert performances in mind, avoiding overdubs unless they could be performed live.

On the following tour, XTC were the supporting act for the Police, playing arena stadiums in Australia, New Zealand, the US, and Canada. Partridge's fatigue worsened, and his mental state continued to deteriorate. While in upstate New York in December 1980, he exited the tour van to relieve himself. As he remembered, "I wandered into this field ... and I thought, 'Who am I? Who the hell am I, and what am I doing in this field?' And just got back ... laying on the seat in the back of the van in a fetal position, sobbing quietly, not knowing who the hell I was." His then-wife, Marianne, blamed his illness on his longtime dependency on Valium, which he had been prescribed since his early teens. On 4 April 1981, while the couple were staying at the Tropicana Hotel in Los Angeles, she threw away his tablets. From then on, he experienced intense withdrawal effects that he later described as "brain melt".

In March, XTC attempted to work with Madness producers Clive Langer and Alan Winstanley at the behest of Virgin. They recorded "Ball and Chain", "Punch and Judy", and "Egyptian Solution (Thebes in a Box)". Langer quit on the first day as he felt his input was unnecessary. The sessions were finished with Winstanley at AIR Studios, but only his production of "Egyptian Solution" was kept by the group.

On 2 June, XTC performed their last gig of the year and their last ever British date, in Cardiff. Partridge requested to cease touring, but was opposed by Virgin Records, his bandmates, and the band's management. Bassist Colin Moulding and guitarist Dave Gregory were confused at Partridge's unwillingness to tour and believed that he would reconsider once the next album was finished. Moulding explained: "The problem for us is that we had seen Andy in the early days and witnessed how great he was with an audience. For us then, this came out of the blue." Partridge did not approach drummer Terry Chambers due to an expected hostile reaction. Further to the band's demoralisation was their poor financial situation, as they never received any of the revenue generated by the increasing number of sold-out shows they performed. This made Gregory and Chambers particularly averse to Partridge's proposal, since they were not songwriters and received a much smaller share of publishing royalties.

=== Style and production ===
With English Settlement, Partridge decided to move XTC in a "more pastoral, more acoustic direction". He believed that if he "wrote an album with a sound less geared towards touring then maybe there would be less pressure to tour." Compared to the band's previous albums, English Settlement showcased more complex and intricate arrangements, lengthier songs, lyrics that covered broader social issues, and a wider range of music styles. According to music journalist Annie Zaleski, the album rests "stubbornly in between genres and resists pigeonholing." She adds that the styles range from "caterwauling mod-pop" ("Leisure") to "buzzing synthpunk" ("Fly on the Wall") and "full-on ska-pop" ("Down in the Cockpit").

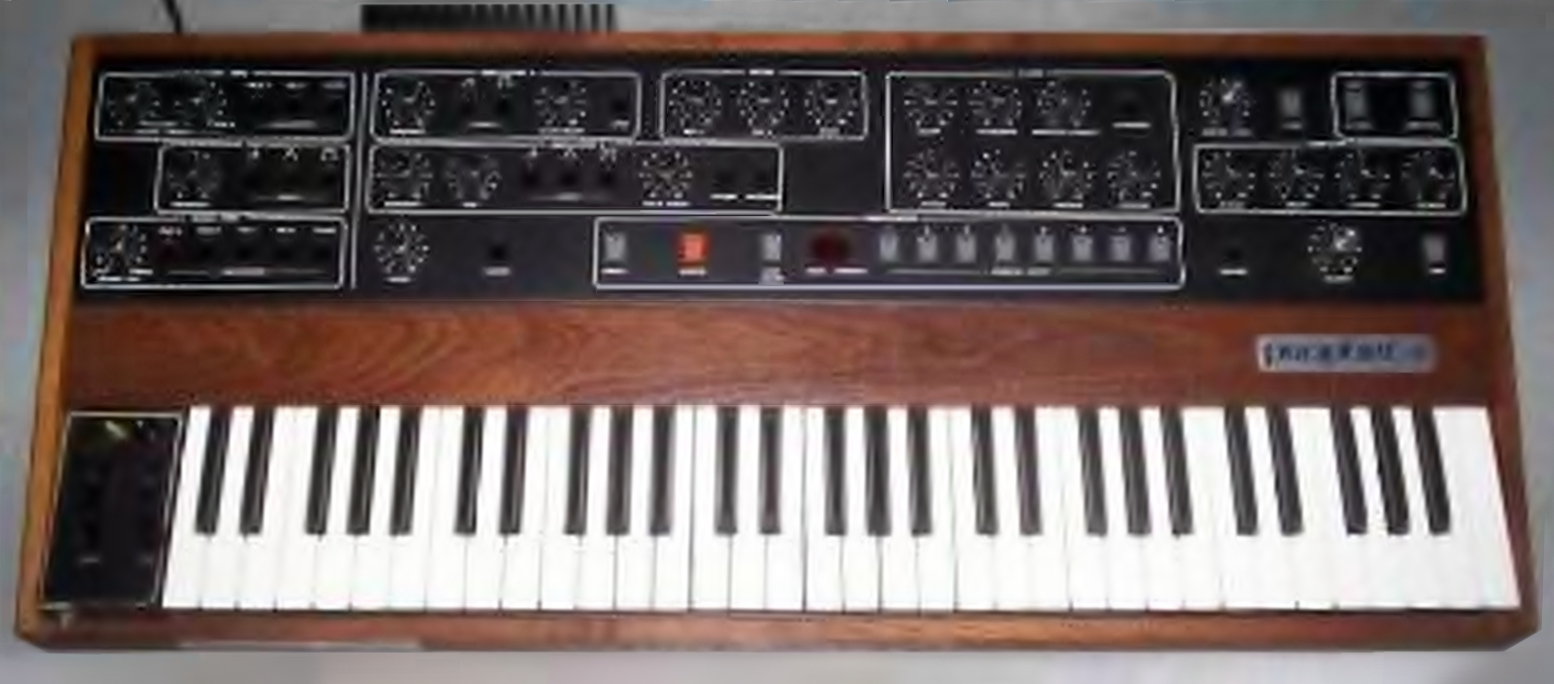
The band's desire for more varied timbres led them to purchase a Prophet 5 synthesizer for the album's recording.

Most of the English Settlement material was written and rehearsed during the summer of 1981 at Terry "Fatty" Alderton's Tudor Rehearsal Studio. Moulding responded to the new acoustic direction by purchasing an Ibanez fretless bass, while Gregory bought a Rickenbacker 12-string and began contributing more as a keyboardist. Since Partridge recently gave away his acoustic guitar during an appearance on Multi-Coloured Swap Shop, he bought a new one for the record. He also convinced Chambers to buy a new assortment of drums and a timbale. Music critic Chris Woodstra wrote that Gregory, Partridge, and Moulding's new instruments, plus Chambers' new drum synthesiser, "set the tone" for the record. Moulding also used his Fender Precision Bass on a few tracks.

English Settlement was recorded in six weeks at The Manor Studio in Shipton-on-Cherwell, Oxfordshire. The album was self-produced by the band with Hugh Padgham, who engineered their previous two LPs. Padgham's partner, Steve Lillywhite, who produced the last two albums, did not return as the band felt Padgham was the one who assisted with finding interesting sounds. In Padgham's recollection, "I just let the band be themselves. I've always been that kind of producer. ... they had quite a clear idea of what they wanted and I just made sure that this could be translated as easily and as clearly as possible." The recordings were performed live and then treated with overdubs and occasional edits. The band recorded about 30 songs. When they could not decide on a track listing, it was decided to expand the LP to two discs.

== Music and lyrics ==
=== Disc one ===
"Runaways", the album's opening track, is about a child running away from home to the city to escape domestic violence. Utilising a Prophet-5 synthesizer, the song features slow drum and guitar rhythms to build its atmosphere.

"Ball and Chain" was written as a response to the economic policies of Margaret Thatcher. Moulding explained: "The whole Swindon area seemed to be under the hammer. Mrs. Thatcher had come to power a couple of years before, and everything was kind of being battered to the ground. 3 million unemployed -- it was a difficult period". He cited it as his least favourite song on the record.

"Senses Working Overtime" was a conscious attempt at writing a commercial single. It is based on Manfred Mann's "5-4-3-2-1" (1964). At the time, Partridge did not think the song was good enough to be a single, and was surprised when Virgin chose to issue it. Moulding remembered that it was "like something Genesis or Queen would have done, and these were the bands that were openly mocked two years before."

"Jason and the Argonauts" was born from a guitar riff, with one harmonic line constant and another providing a counterpoint, that reminded Partridge of "traveling across the sea". The lyric idea was inspired by one of his favourite films, Jason and the Argonauts (1963), as well as The Island of Doctor Moreau. He said, "This was written from a perspective where I knew I didn't want to tour. I knew I was not enjoying the treadmill. I was beginning to feel really like a prisoner. ... I was just trying to describe this process of traveling the world, and growing up, opening up, seeing things." The recording was originally a couple of minutes longer and had to be edited down.

"No Thugs in Our House" is about a middle-class couple struggling to accept that their son is a violent racist. According to Partridge, the decision to write the song was inspired by the prominence of the National Front in British politics. The musical progression was inspired by that of Eddie Cochran's "Summertime Blues". Partridge's vocals were treated with slapback echo to mimic the rock and roll feeling of the Cochran song.

=== Disc two ===
"Melt the Guns", the opening track of the second disc, is a funk-influenced track with political themes, critical of the arms industry, gun culture, and American militarism.

"It's Nearly Africa" was described by Partridge as being about "reclaiming lost innocence" and rejecting modern technology. It was born out of two unfinished songs Partridge had written, "Jazz Love", a song the band would jam on during sound checks on the Drums and Wires tour and "Primitive Now", where the lyrical theme came from. The song features a saxophone solo from Partridge. It was never played live, but Partridge has said there were plans for him to play drums alongside Terry Chambers.

"Fly on the Wall" is about "Big Brother" and was inspired by the fly on the wall documentaries appearing on British television at the time. The song features tremolo guitar, heavily compressed drums, "buzzing Morse code synthesizer" and distorted vocals, qualities not heard on the demo recorded by Moulding. He credited Partridge with the "Morse code buzzy-fly" sound and said it "added a lot to the credibility of the song because it made the music sound funnier and gave an ambiguity to the song. You didn't know whether I was taking the piss or not."

"English Roundabout" is about English city life. Fans erroneously assumed that the title referred to the Magic Roundabout in Swindon. The song is a rare example of popular music written in the 5/4 time signature. Its ska/bluebeat rhythm was contributed by Chambers.

The final song, "Snowman", is focused on themes of romantic rejection. In a 2006 interview, Partridge stated that the track was inspired by a mandolin pattern featured on a track on the 1979 album Fluid Rustle by Eberhard Weber.

=== Leftover ===
Other tracks were produced but relegated to single B-sides. They are Partridge's "Tissue Tigers (The Arguers)", "Punch and Judy", "Heaven Is Paved with Broken Glass", "Egyptian Solution (Thebes in a Box)", and "Mantis on Parole", Moulding's "Blame the Weather", and the band's "Over Rusty Water". Some of these later reappeared on the compilations Beeswax: Some B-Sides 1977–1982 (1982), Rag and Bone Buffet: Rare Cuts and Leftovers (1990), Coat of Many Cupboards (2002), and the EP Dear God (1987).

== Title and packaging ==
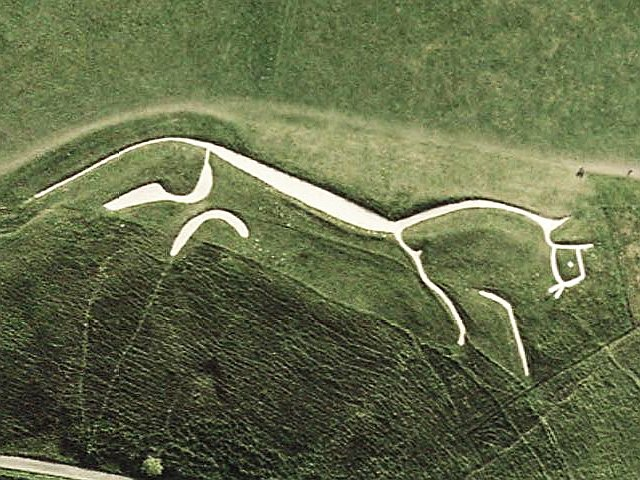
Oxfordshire's Uffington White Horse monument, the inspiration for the album cover

The album cover is based upon the Uffington White Horse in southwest Oxfordshire, which is about 9 miles (14 km) east of Swindon, Wiltshire, XTC's hometown. The band chose the image since it was a strong, historic symbol of England. When they presented it to an agent from their American distributor, Epic Records, the executive responded: "It looks like a duck! If you want a horse, we'll get our artists to draw one!" The company then offered the group illustrations of a mustang, a bronco, and a person in a cartoon caricature of an English village. When issued in the US, the horse was not embossed as it was on the original UK release.

Working titles for the LP included Rogue Soup, Motorcycle Landscape, World Colour Banner, Explosion of Flowers, and Knights on Fire. Partridge said that English Settlement was ultimately chosen because he felt "it's our most English record." He explained: "It's kind of an ambiguous title. ... [The horse is] literally a kind of Iron Age advertisement for an English settlement that was on top of the hill when the first settlers came to England. And it's us living here, settling here, and also the settling of viewpoints, when two people have a disagreement or a different view and they get something settled."

== Release ==
=== Sales and promotion ===
English Settlement was released on 12 February 1982 as the group's first double album. In several territories outside the UK, the album was released as a single LP. Both the album and lead single "Senses Working Overtime" became the highest-charting records they would ever have in the UK, peaking at number five and number 10, respectively. The album remained on the UK Album Chart for 11 weeks. In the US, it reached number 48 on the Billboard 200 for a 20-week stay. Two more UK singles were issued: "Ball and Chain" (number 58) and "No Thugs in Our House" (no chart showing).

Music videos were filmed for "Senses Working Overtime", "No Thugs in Our House", "All of a Sudden (It's Too Late)", and "Ball and Chain". The video for "Senses Working Overtime" was shot during tour rehearsals. Partridge did not want to embark on an English Settlement tour that included more than a few one-off gigs. His requests were ignored by Virgin and the band's management, and an extended international tour was scheduled. XTC also made numerous television appearances to promote the album. On 11 February 1982, they performed "Yacht Dance" and "No Thugs in Our House" on The Old Grey Whistle Test. It served as a warm-up to the proceeding tour. Partridge later cited the performance as the first time he had experienced stage fright. The band also made a live appearance on The Oxford Road Show, performing "Snowman", "Ball and Chain", and "Jason and the Argonauts".

XTC's world tour began on 7 March in Brussels, and included further stops in France, Italy, the UK, and the US. An elaborate stage set that displayed a large replica of the Uffington White Horse was constructed for the performances. Only nine full shows were ultimately performed.

=== Tour withdrawal ===
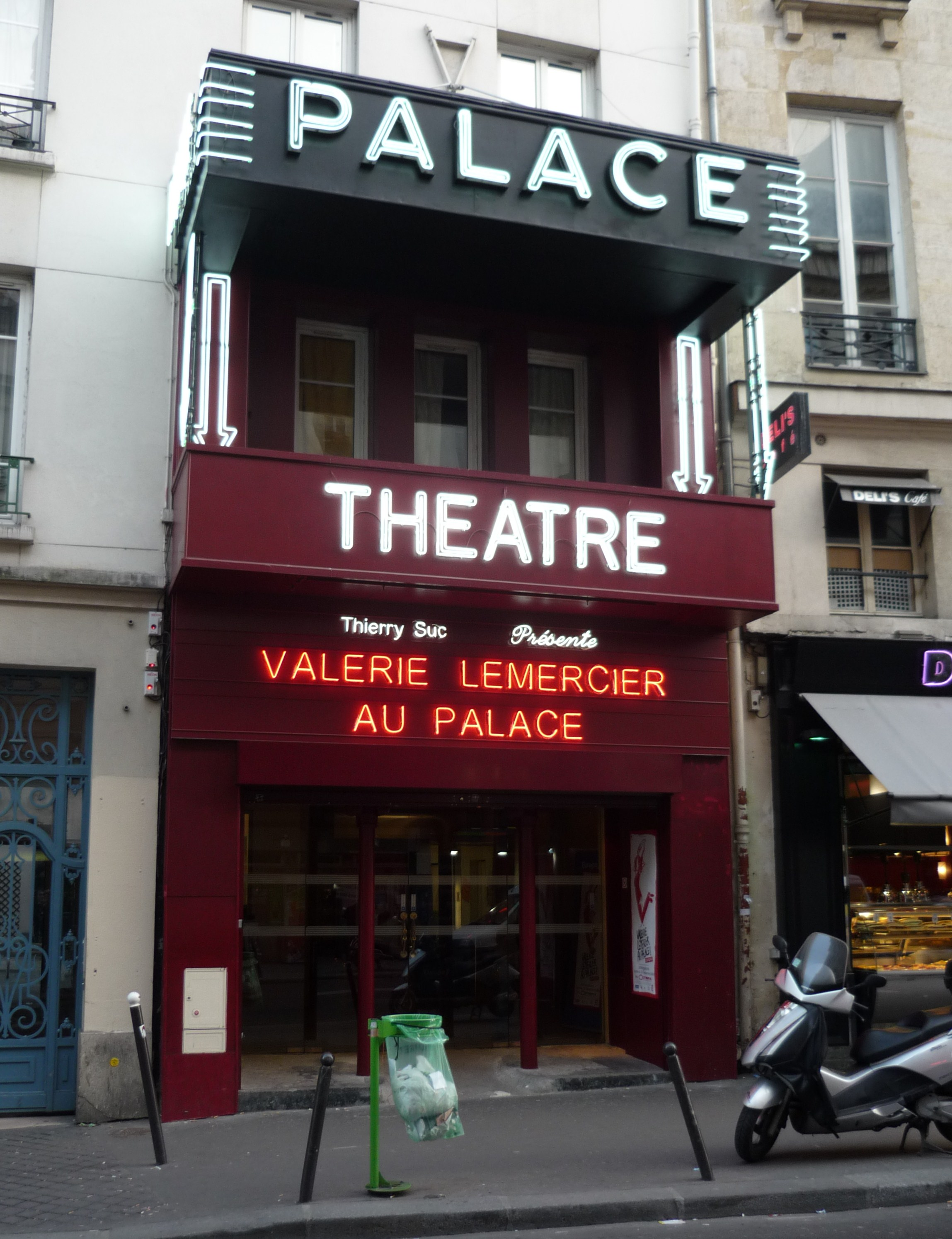
Le Palace theatre, where Partridge experienced a panic attack and left the stage mid-performance

On 18 March, shortly before XTC were to play a sold-out, simulcast gig at Le Palace in Paris, Partridge told a French journalist, "I like to listen to music that relaxes me and stimulates me in a relaxing manner. Because this is like owning a circus. And when you're finished with touring or whatever, you don't want to see other circuses. You just want to relax." He seemingly panicked during the first song in the set and ran off the stage, ending the show. His bandmates found him backstage, clutching his stomach and retching in pain. An ambulance was called as it was thought he may have had appendicitis. It was soon discovered that he had not eaten in days.

The promoters and Virgin France demanded that they stay in the country and play another gig. Partridge agreed to play another show to placate them. He escaped the next day on a flight back to England. The band's eight-date English tour was postponed to the summer. He underwent hypnotherapy treatment wherein "the hypnotist would take me back through pretend gigs, and I had to try and live all of this anxiety out. And I just sat in my garden like a wreck. I just sat in my garden with an acoustic guitar strumming just gibberish."

Believing that he had recovered from the episode, Partridge rejoined the group for their first tour of the US as a headlining act. The band played the first date at The California Theatre in San Diego on 3 April. Gregory said that they were "totally unrehearsed" during the performance because "we'd not played together for two weeks. ... It was obvious that he was ill, but exactly what it was, no-one knew." Partridge remembered feeling stomach pains again and played the entire performance on "auto-pilot". The next day, XTC were scheduled to play a sold-out show at the Hollywood Palladium in Los Angeles, Partridge woke up that morning, he said, and "couldn't get off the bed. My legs wouldn't function. Walked to Ben Frank's coffee shop, where we'd all agreed to meet, in slow motion like I had both legs in plaster, trying not to throw up. I got in there, they knew what I was going to say."

The remaining 18 US dates were cancelled and XTC incurred a £20,000 debt. Discounting occasional appearances on radio and television, they never performed live again. "Complete mental and physical exhaustion" and the possibility of Partridge developing an ulcer were given as the reasons for the tour's cancellation. It was later reported in Creem that he was "seen acting weird earlier that day and 'questioning what he was doing with his life.' Good question, Andy!!" For a period afterward, it was rumoured among fans and industry insiders that the group had stopped performing because Partridge had died, and some American bands put on XTC tribute shows in his remembrance.

== Critical reception ==
=== Contemporary reception ===
Contemporary professional ratings
Review scores
Source	Rating
Rolling Stone	3/5 stars
Smash Hits	8½/10
The Village Voice	B+
Sounds	5/5 stars

English Settlement received worldwide acclaim. Writing for Rolling Stone, Parke Puterbaugh stated: "Once again, XTC has managed the difficult feat of sounding accessible even while moving into evermore abstruse and adventuresome territory. ... The result is a program of numbers that resonate across all manner of invigorating wordplay with a jazzy, stoned ambiance." In Heavy Metal, Lou Stathis wrote that XTC's oft-applied "too clever for their own good" tag was "criminal horseshit" and deemed the album their finest work yet.

Creem's Jim Farber took issue with the political songs, namely "Melt the Guns", and said "The only problem is that the music and vocals of Andy Partridge and Colin Moulding are so entertainingly odd, they tend to deflate the stern-faced lyrics. ... As a whole, XTC may not shake, rattle and roll – but they do sputter, twitch and gyrate, and sometimes that can get you through the night just as well." Mark Dighton of The Michigan Daily opined that "there isn't really much wrong with English Settlement" apart from being "uncomfortably far from their best work." He praised its "lyrical intelligence" and added that most of the songs "would benefit greatly from a more adventurous and upfront attack."

=== Retrospective reception and legacy ===
Retrospective professional ratings
Review scores
Source	Rating
AllMusic	4/5 stars
Chicago Tribune	3/4 stars
Encyclopedia of Popular Music	3/5 stars
Pitchfork	10/10
Q	4/5 stars
The Rolling Stone Album Guide	2/5 stars

English Settlement continues to be regarded by many critics as the band's finest album. Chris Dahlhen of Pitchfork awarded the album's 2001 remaster a perfect score, saying that the music had aged well, and wrote: "English Settlement catches that moment, as they change from a young band to a mature one: this is the pivot on which their entire career hangs, and a vantage point from which both ends of it make sense. It's timeless." Brett Milano of the Boston Herald called it "the band's masterpiece".

Conversely, Greg Kot of the Chicago Tribune deemed the album excessively long, "with 15 songs instead of, say, the best 10." AllMusic's Chris Woodstra felt that "English Settlement seems more a transitional album than anything else, although the textural sound of the album is quite remarkable, indicating the direction they would take in their post-touring incarnation." Stereogum's Robert Ham evaluated the album as the fifth-best of the group's discography. He criticised side three of the vinyl as "an absolute throwaway" that could have jeopardised the record "if the songs surrounding them weren't so damn good."

English Settlement was voted number 884 in the third edition of Colin Larkin's All Time Top 1000 Albums (2000). In 2002, it was ranked number 46 on Pitchfork's list of "The Top 100 Albums of the 1980s". Contributor Dominique Leone wrote: "this double-LP was something of a sonic renaissance. The band's penchant for spiking the pop punch began a gradual shift towards the pastoral and 'arty,' yet these tunes could hardly be described as pretentious."

In the 18 months between English Settlement and their next release (1983's Mummer), XTC's popularity faltered among British record-buyers and critics. Music journalist Jim Keoghan summarised the album's legacy:

In the UK, XTC were never again able to capture that alchemical mixture of critical and commercial success that English Settlement gave them. Over the following years they continued to release material that despite garnering critical acclaim never found a significant audience in the way that English Settlement had. As time wore on they became fixed in many people's minds as an 80s band. If they gathered column inches at all, it was more for their increasingly dysfunctional relationship with their record label than for the music they were making.

In later years, the band reflected that they did not have enough time to record the album, and felt that portions of the record sound unfinished as a result. Despite his feelings, Partridge said the record was "the first time the picture became multicolored and widescreen. Before that, it had been television-sized format and rather black and white." Gregory called it "a watershed record for us" and the start of their "Sgt. Pepper" period.

== Track listing ==
=== Original UK double album ===
All tracks are written by Andy Partridge, except those marked with (*), which are by Colin Moulding.

Side one
No.	Title	Length
1.	"Runaways" (*)	4:34
2.	"Ball and Chain" (*)	4:32
3.	"Senses Working Overtime"	4:50
4.	"Jason and the Argonauts"	6:07

Side two
No.	Title	Length
1.	"No Thugs in Our House"	5:09
2.	"Yacht Dance"	3:56
3.	"All of a Sudden (It's Too Late)"	5:21

Side three
No.	Title	Length
1.	"Melt the Guns"	6:34
2.	"Leisure"	5:02
3.	"It's Nearly Africa"	3:55
4.	"Knuckle Down"	4:28

Side four
No.	Title	Length
1.	"Fly on the Wall" (*)	3:19
2.	"Down in the Cockpit"	5:27
3.	"English Roundabout" (*)	3:59
4.	"Snowman"	5:03
Total length:		72:22

=== Single LP version ===
The album was also released as a single LP, removing five tracks from the original double LP version and reordering the remaining tracks. Some versions of the following track listing replace "It's Nearly Africa" with "Yacht Dance", resulting in a nearly identical runtime.

Side one
No.	Title	Length
1.	"Runaways" (*)	4:32
2.	"Ball and Chain" (*)	4:28
3.	"Senses Working Overtime"	4:50
4.	"Jason and the Argonauts"	6:05
5.	"Snowman"	5:07

Side two
No.	Title	Length
1.	"Melt the Guns"	6:31
2.	"No Thugs in Our House"	5:08
3.	"It's Nearly Africa"	3:53
4.	"English Roundabout" (*)	3:37
5.	"All of a Sudden (It's Too Late)"	5:19
Total length:		48:50

== Personnel ==
Credits adapted from the LP liner notes.

XTC

- Colin Moulding – lead vocals (tracks 1–2, 12, 14), backing vocals, fretless bass, Fender bass, mini-Korg synthesizer (1), piano (1), percussion
- Andy Partridge – lead vocals (3–11, 13, 15), backing vocals, electric guitar, semi-acoustic electric 12-string guitar, semi-acoustic electric guitar, acoustic guitar, mini-Korg synthesizer (1, 4, 12–13, 15), Prophet V synthesizer (4, 13, 15), anklung (6), alto saxophone (9–10), frog noises (11), percussion
- Dave Gregory – electric 12-string guitar, electric guitar, nylon-string Spanish guitar, fuzz-boxed 12-string guitar, semi-acoustic electric 12-string guitar, Prophet V synthesizer (1, 5, 10, 14), mini-Korg synthesizer (2), piano (15), backing vocals, percussion
- Terry Chambers – drums, drum synthesizer (1, 3, 6, 10, 15), percussion, backing vocals

Additional personnel

- Hugh Padgham – backing vocals on "Ball and Chain"
- Hans de Vente – backing vocals on "It's Nearly Africa"

Technical

- Hugh Padgham – producer, engineer, mixing
- XTC – producer, mixing
- Howard Gray – assistant engineer
- Ken Ansell – artwork
- Art Dragon – illustrations
- Allan Ballard – photography

== Charts ==
Chart (1982)	Peak position
Australia (Kent Music Report)	14
UK Official Charts	5
US Billboard 200	48
Canada RPM Top 50	15
