= Wonderland (XTC song) =

Single by XTC

from the album Mummer
- B-side: "Jump"
- Released: June 1983
- Genre: Neo-psychedelia
- Length: 4:50 (album version); 4:03 (single version); 4:23 (home demo version)
- Label: Virgin Records
- Songwriter(s): Colin Moulding
- Producer(s): XTC and Steve Nye

XTC singles chronology
"Great Fire" (1983)	"Wonderland" (1983)	"Love on a Farmboy's Wages" (1983)

"Wonderland" is a single by XTC released in June 1983, written by Colin Moulding and taken from the album Mummer.

Unlike most of XTC's work - which usually features a more guitar-oriented sound - "Wonderland" is heavily laden with synthesizer textures, most of which came from a Prophet-5 (the band's main synthesizer at the time).

This was the only single issued in the U.S. by Geffen Records from the album.

A promotional music video was directed by Peter Sinclair.

This is one of the songs from the Mummer sessions to feature drummer Terry Chambers prior to his departure from XTC.

Andy Partridge has subsequently described "Wonderland" as one of Moulding's "most beautiful melodies".

== Track listing ==
1. "Wonderland" (Colin Moulding) – 3:50
2. "Jump" (Andy Partridge) – 4:39

== Personnel ==
- Terry Chambers – drums
- Dave Gregory – keyboards
- Colin Moulding – vocals, bass
- Steve Nye – mini-korg synthesizer
- Andy Partridge – guitar
- Mixed by Alex Sadkin and Phil Thornalley at RAK Studio Two
