= Love on a Farmboy's Wages =

Single by XTC

from the album Mummer
- B-side: "In Loving Memory Of A Name"
- Released: 16 September 1983
- Recorded: 1982
- Genre: Neo-psychedelia; folk pop
- Length: 3:58; 3:47 (home demo version)
- Label: Virgin
- Songwriter: Andy Partridge
- Producers: Steve Nye, XTC

XTC singles chronology
"Wonderland" (1983)	"Love on a Farmboy's Wages" (1983)	"Thanks for Christmas" (1983)

"Love on a Farmboy's Wages" is a song written by Andy Partridge of the English rock band XTC, released as the third single from their 1983 album Mummer. It peaked at number 50 on the UK Singles Chart. Partridge wrote the song during the aftermath of the cancelled English Settlement tour. It features a key modulation from E to F# before its bridge. Drummer Terry Chambers left the band during rehearsals for the song. The single's cover art is a photograph of Partridge's wallet with the title embossed.

== Critical reception ==
Music Week said that the song possessed a "rhythmic drive" and was "pretty but not demanding fare". Ned Raggett of AllMusic called the song "a folk pop delight" which called to mind the period in which "Bert Jansch and Nick Drake had as much influence as Lennon and McCartney".

== Personnel ==
XTC

- Dave Gregory
- Colin Moulding
- Andy Partridge

== Charts ==
Chart (1983)	Peak position
UK Singles (OCC)	50

== Cover version ==
The folk-rock band Fairport Convention included a cover of the song on their 2007 album Sense of Occasion. Their guitarist and founding member Simon Nicol sang the lead vocal.
