= This Is Pop =

- "This Is Pop?" single cover

Single by XTC

from the album White Music
- Released: January 20, 1978
- Recorded: 1977
- Genre: New wave; new pop; pop; post-punk
- Length: 2:40
- Label: Virgin
- Songwriter: Andy Partridge
- Producers: John Leckie (album version); Robert John "Mutt" Lange (single version)

XTC singles chronology
"Statue of Liberty" (1978)	"This Is Pop" (1978)	"Are You Receiving Me?" (1978)

"This Is Pop" is a song by the English rock band XTC from their 1978 debut studio album White Music. A rerecorded version, typeset as "This Is Pop?", was released as the group's third single. The single was released on the 20th of January, 1978, the same day as the album, and promoted as the second and final single to the album.

== Background ==
Guitarist Andy Partridge wrote "This Is Pop" as a response to journalistic terms for music genres such as "punk", which he believed were redundant of "pop". The song's opening F chord was based on the Beatles' "A Hard Day's Night" (1964).

== Legacy ==
The song title was adopted for the 2017 documentary about the band, XTC: This Is Pop.

== Personnel ==
XTC

- Barry Andrews – keyboards
- Terry Chambers – drums
- Colin Moulding – bass, vocals
- Andy Partridge – vocals, guitar
