= Statue of Liberty (song) =

Single by XTC

from the album White Music
- B-side: "Hang On to the Night"
- Released: 6 January 1978
- Recorded: 1977
- Genre: New wave; power pop; pub rock; ska
- Length: 2:23
- Label: Virgin
- Songwriter: Andy Partridge
- Producer: John Leckie

XTC singles chronology
"Science Friction" (1977)	"Statue of Liberty" (1978)	"This Is Pop?" (1978)

Official audio
- "Statue of Liberty" (2001 Remaster) on YouTube

"Statue of Liberty" is a 1978 single by XTC. It was recorded at Abbey Road Studios, London and subsequently banned by BBC Radio 1 for the lyrics "In my fantasy I sail beneath your skirt". XTC performed the song on the BBC2 television show The Old Grey Whistle Test in 1978.

== Music video ==
The music video for "Statue of Liberty" shows the band performing the song in a black room while cardboard cutouts of the Statue of Liberty holds up the microphones for the band. At the end, keyboard player Barry Andrews lifts up his keyboard and walks around the room holding it. The video was released on the Look Look video compilation.

== Personnel ==
- Andy Partridge – guitar and vocals
- Barry Andrews – steam piano, clapped out organs
- Colin Moulding – bass and vocals
- Terry Chambers – drums and vocals
