= Respectable Street =

Single by XTC

from the album Black Sea
- Released: 13 March 1981
- Recorded: 1980
- Studio: Townhouse Studios, London
- Genre: Post-punk; pop
- Length: 3:37 (album version); 3:07 (single version)
- Label: Virgin
- Songwriter: Andy Partridge
- Producer: Steve Lillywhite

XTC singles chronology
"Sgt. Rock (Is Going to Help Me)" (1980)	"Respectable Street" (1981)	"Senses Working Overtime" (1982)

"Respectable Street" is a song written by Andy Partridge of XTC, released as the opening track on their 1980 album Black Sea. According to Partridge, the song is about English streets and "the hypocrisy of living in a so-called respectable neighborhood. It's all talk behind twitching curtains. It's all Alan Bennett land." In another interview Partridge reveals that Respectable Street was based on a real street Bowood Road in Swindon, which was diagonally opposite the flat above a shop on Kingshill Road where he was living at the time he wrote it. Discounting the Canada-only "Love at First Sight", it was the fourth and last single issued from the LP. BBC Radio banned the song because of its references to abortion and a "Sony Entertainment Centre".

== Legacy ==
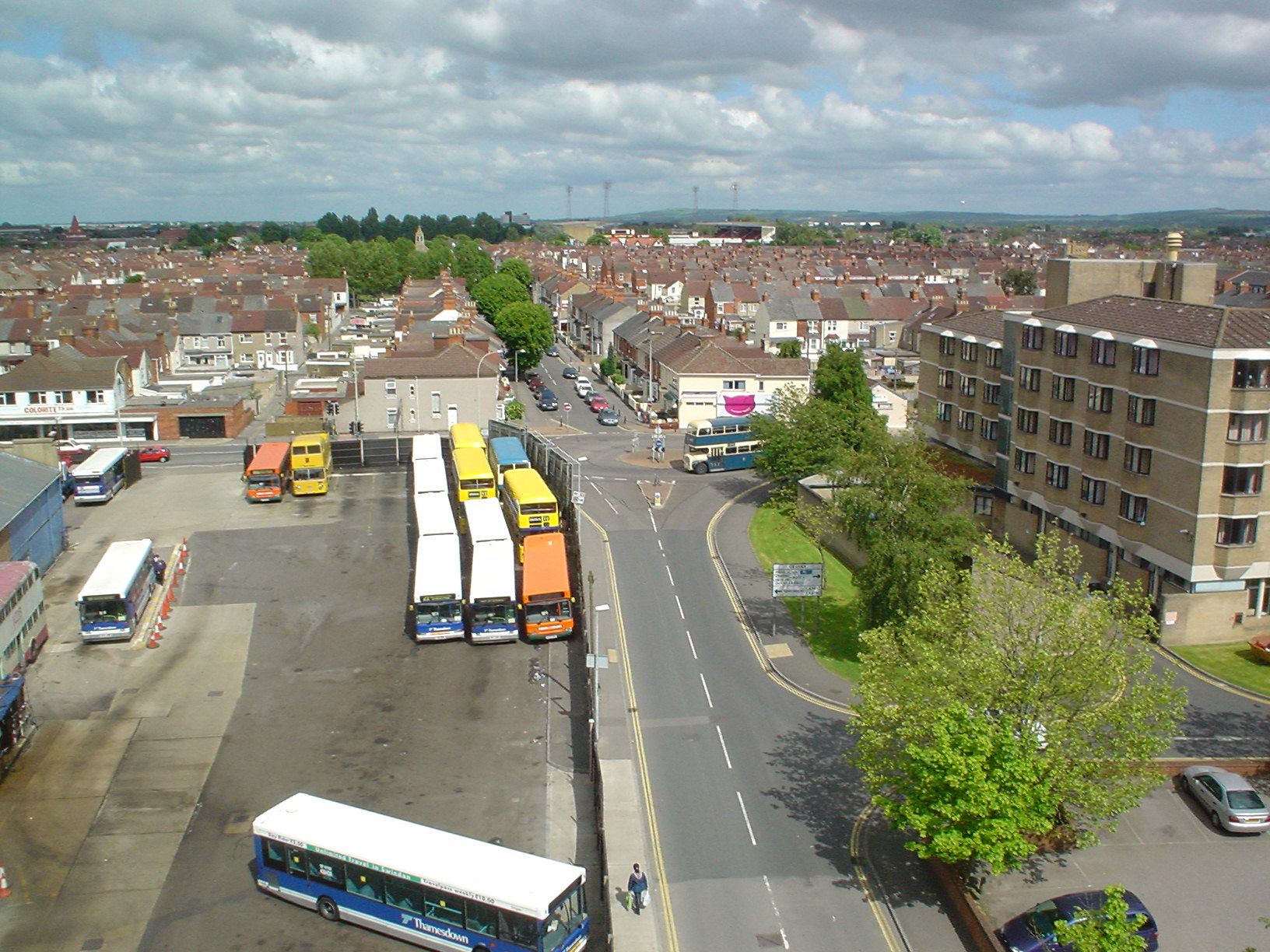
A street view of Swindon in 2005

Music journalist John Harris highlighted "Respectable Street" as "one of the most evocative items in Partridge's oeuvre." In 1996, critic Jack Rabid praised its "sardonic crack" and wrote "am I the only one who's noticed that super-fans Blur have ripped this song off three times already???!!!!"

In 1982, it was the only song XTC performed at a televised gig simulcast in Paris, which became one of the last live performances of their career. Partridge experienced a panic attack mid-performance and walked off the stage.

It is the first XTC recording in which Dave Gregory contributed his keyboard playing.

== Personnel ==
XTC

- Terry Chambers
- Dave Gregory
- Colin Moulding
- Andy Partridge

== Variations ==
- Original album version - Black Sea (1980)
- Single remix (1981) - Rag and Bone Buffet: Rare Cuts and Leftovers
- Live versions
  - BBC Radio 1 Live in Concert (1982, recorded November 1980)
  - Urgh! A Music War (1981)
- Home demo, live studio demo, and instrumental versions released on 2017 expanded edition of Black Sea
