= Mummer (album) =

Studio album by XTC
- Released: 30 August 1983
- Recorded: September–December 1982
- Studios: The Manor (Oxfordshire); Genetic (Berkshire); Odyssey (London)
- Genre: Progressive pop
- Length: 41:19
- Label: Virgin
- Producers: Steve Nye, XTC, Bob Sargeant

XTC chronology
English Settlement (1982)	Mummer (1983)	The Big Express (1984)

Singles from Mummer
- 1. "Great Fire" Released: 22 April 1983; 2. "Wonderland" Released: 24 June 1983; 3. "Love on a Farmboy's Wages" Released: 19 September 1983

Mummer is the sixth studio album by the English rock band XTC, released on 30 August 1983 on Virgin Records. It was the first XTC album to be recorded following the band's retirement from live performance in 1982. The album's title and artwork refers to a Mummers' play, in which the identity of the players is hidden. A working title considered for the album was Fruits Fallen From God's Garden.

Frontman Andy Partridge, who at the time was recovering from a nervous breakdown, embraced the idea of the band becoming a purely studio-based act, which resulted in a new burst of productivity. Drummer Terry Chambers, who preferred performing live, struggled to adapt and quit the group after recording only two tracks and a B-side, with Pete Phipps replacing him for the remaining sessions.

Virgin Records were concerned by the album's lack of potential singles, and urged the band to rework the material several times, which delayed its release by several months. Mummer eventually appeared in August 1983, reaching No. 51 on the UK albums chart and No. 145 on the U.S. Billboard albums chart. It spawned three UK singles: "Great Fire", "Wonderland" and "Love on a Farmboy's Wages", the latter of which reached No. 50 on the UK singles chart.

== Background ==
Following the band's retirement from touring in 1982, frontman Andy Partridge and his wife Marianne vacated their rent-free flat at King's Hill Road and moved to an Edwardian home in Swindon's Old Town, while bassist/songwriter Colin Moulding spent more time with his family.

Partridge became reclusive, later stating, "I didn't want anyone connected with the outside world seeing me. I felt trapped like a monkey on a barrel organ. Everything I did was some sort of performance." Partridge resumed hypnotherapy sessions and began composing a series of new songs in his back garden, later commenting, "I was in a strange frame of mind but I couldn't stop these songs tumbling out".

A string of debts in the wake of the band's cancelled American tour led to a contract renegotiation with Virgin Records, wherein the band agreed to provide six more albums and a "best of" compilation, in return for which Virgin would alter their contract and lend the band an advance to cover all outstanding debts. Additionally, the band negotiated to take control of their own finances going forward, with any money owed by Virgin going into a deposit account, where they would pay themselves a monthly wage of £650.

Drummer Terry Chambers, who now lived in Australia with girlfriend Donna and new son Kai, reluctantly moved back to Swindon to prepare for the new album's sessions.

== Production ==
The band recruited Steve Nye to produce Mummer, after Partridge became enamored with his work on Japan's Tin Drum (1981). Band member Dave Gregory later opined that "Japan was a very different group from us. They were keyboard driven. [Tin Drum] was a very beautiful record, but Steve wasn't right for us."

Rehearsals for the album were conducted at the Swindon Mechanics' Institute theatre. Initial recording sessions began in September 1982 and were conducted with Nye at Martin Rushent's Genetic Studios in Pangbourne. These sessions were for "Beating of Hearts" and "Wonderland"—two songs that had been selected by Virgin to be released as a double A-sided single—as well as a third song, "Toys", later issued as the B-side of the "Love on a Farmboy's Wages" single.

After Virgin decided that the three new recordings weren't potential hit singles, rehearsals then resumed at the Mechanics Institute theatre. It was during these sessions in October that Chambers left in the middle of rehearsing the song "Love on a Farmboy's Wages", due to displeasure with both the band's retirement from touring and their new material, as well as difficulty with his girlfriend. Chambers' frustration was exacerbated when Partridge attempted to demonstrate the kind of drum part he wanted for the song, with Partridge later recalling, "He put his sticks down, picked up his keys and cigarettes, and said, 'I'm off then, chaps. I'm leaving the group. So...er...see ya!' And that was it, cymbals swinging on their stands." Gregory then suggested former Gary Glitter drummer Pete Phipps as a replacement, who had also drummed for Random Hold, a band that had once supported XTC on tour. Recording continued with Phipps at the Manor Studio through November.

== Artwork and packaging ==
Regarding the album's title, Partridge later commented, "We had wanted to call it Fruits Fallen From God's Garden and I'd got Dave Dragon from the Design Clinic to draw up a sleeve in which we had fruit for our heads, sitting outside an old country estate. But they didn't want us seen as fruits and the mention of God in the title induced panic amongst the marketing bods [people]." The new title, Mummer, referred to Mummers' play performers in the West Country of England, who appear in disguise, a concept that Partridge felt reflected the band's new retirement from touring. A subsequent photoshoot featuring the band dressed in mummer suits was rejected by Virgin, who complained about the members' identities being concealed. On May 6, 2022, Ape House reissued the album on 200 gram vinyl with the originally intended sleeve art restored.

== Release ==
The album's release was delayed for many months by Virgin, who did not think the album contained any hit singles. The label recruited Bob Sargeant to produce more tracks, and Partridge provided "Great Fire" and "Gold", which were then recorded at Odyssey Studios in London, with the former becoming the album's first single. After "Great Fire" was issued as a single on 22 April and was not successful, Virgin asked the band to provide additional new songs, to which they refused, so a compromise was struck; four potential singles that had already been recorded—"Wonderland", "Funk Pop a Roll", "Deliver Us From the Elements" and "Human Alchemy"—would be remixed by Alex Sadkin and Phil Thornalley, which eventually led the album to go over budget.

"Wonderland" was issued as a single in June but was also unsuccessful, leading Virgin to ask the band for a third time to develop more songs. Gregory later recalled, "Virgin said, 'No album, sorry chaps. We want more songs.' We said 'No! You're not having any more songs. You're putting the album out. We're sick to death of it. We want it out of our lives so we can look to the future. We're fed up with this.'"

Mummer was finally released on 30 August 1983. The U.S. release was initially scheduled for 26 May 1983 by Epic Records (it was even assigned a catalog number: BFE 38516), but the label thought it was too acoustic and pastoral for American audiences. It was finally issued in the U.S. by Geffen Records (who subsequently issued all of XTC's Virgin releases) in February 1984. "Wonderland" was the only single from the album issued by Geffen in the U.S.

== Promotion ==
The only promotional public appearance made by the band for the album was in late 1983, when they appeared on the BBC-TV show Pebble Mill at One, where they lip-synced to "Love on a Farmboy's Wages". A promotional video was made for the "Wonderland" single, and five more videos were made in July 1983 for the television documentary program Play at Home.

== Reception ==
Professional ratings
Review scores
Source	Rating
AllMusic	3/5 stars
Chicago Tribune	2.5/4 stars
Encyclopedia of Popular Music	3/5 stars
The Great Rock Discography	7/10
Q	3/5 stars
Record Mirror	4/5 stars
Rolling Stone	3/5 stars
The Rolling Stone Album Guide	2/5 stars
Smash Hits	9/10
The Village Voice	B−

=== Critical ===
J. D. Considine of Rolling Stone felt that Mummer found the band "concentrating on reinforcing, not cluttering, its material", resulting in "XTC's most accessible album yet", and that its "most impressive moments come when the band employs more standard songwriting devices or simply relies on unadorned melodic charm." Conversely, Robert Christgau of The Village Voice felt the album saw the band sounding "more mannered and arid than ever". He concluded that "The eccentric dissonances that sour [Partridge's] melodies and the fitful time shifts that undercut his groove may well bespeak his own sense of distance, but art-poppers who command both melody and groove are rare enough that I wish he'd find another way."

In 1987, David Sinclair of Q opined that the album "paraded moments of inconsequential pastoral whimsy" with "performances of irritating pomposity". In his 1992 appraisal of the band for the Chicago Tribune, Greg Kot stated that Mummer "combines lilting love songs with clumsy social commentaries." In a later retrospective review for AllMusic, Chris Woodstra felt the album was "very much the work of an eccentric in isolation" and featured "moments of real inspiration, resulting in some of the band's finest songs to date". He added that the overall sound set a "pleasingly consistent mood, although the sameness tends to work against the lesser material."

== Track listing ==
All tracks are written by Andy Partridge, except where noted.

Side one
No.	Title	Writer(s)	Length
1.	"Beating of Hearts"		4:01
2.	"Wonderland"	Colin Moulding	4:43
3.	"Love on a Farmboy's Wages"		3:58
4.	"Great Fire"		3:47
5.	"Deliver Us from the Elements"	Moulding	4:34

Side two
No.	Title	Writer(s)	Length
1.	"Human Alchemy"		5:11
2.	"Ladybird"		4:32
3.	"In Loving Memory of a Name"	Moulding	3:16
4.	"Me and the Wind"		4:16
5.	"Funk Pop a Roll"		3:01

2001 CD bonus tracks
No.	Title	Original release	Length
11.	"Frost Circus"	B-side of "Great Fire" 12-inch	3:53
12.	"Jump"	B-side of "Wonderland"	4:39
13.	"Toys"	B-side of "Love on a Farmboy's Wages" double 7-inch	4:20
14.	"Gold"	B-side of "Great Fire"	3:33
15.	"Procession Towards Learning Land"	B-side of "Great Fire" 12-inch	3:46
16.	"Desert Island"	B-side of "Love on a Farmboy's Wages" double 7-inch	4:52

- CD issues prior to 2001 placed the bonus tracks between the original sides one and two of the album.
- Original release information for bonus tracks sourced from Chalkhills and Children (1992), by Chris Twomey.

== Personnel ==
Credits adapted from the album's liner notes, except where otherwise indicated.

XTC

- Andy Partridge – guitar, vocals; saxophone ("Great Fire")
- Colin Moulding – bass, vocals
- Dave Gregory – guitar, keyboards, vocals

Additional personnel

- Terry Chambers – drums ("Beating of Hearts", "Wonderland", "Toys")
- Pete Phipps – drums on remaining tracks
- Steve Nye – miniKORG ("Wonderland"), Mellotron ("Deliver Us from the Elements")
- Gavyn Wright – strings ("Great Fire")
- Nigel Warren-Green – strings ("Great Fire")
- Hans the wind – de vente
- Vince Sullivan – trombone ("Gold")

Technical

- Steve Nye – co-producer, engineer (except "Great Fire", "Gold", "Frost Circus", "Procession Towards Learning Land")
- XTC – co-producer; producer ("Frost Circus", "Procession Towards Learning Land"); mixing ("Desert Island", "Toys")
- Bob Sargeant – co-producer ("Great Fire", "Gold")
- Alex Sadkin – remixing ("Wonderland", "Human Alchemy", "Funk Pop a Roll")
- Phil Thornalley – remixing, engineer ("Wonderland", "Human Alchemy", "Funk Pop a Roll")
- Mark Dearnley – engineer ("Great Fire", "Gold")
- Jim Russell – assistant engineer
- Howard Gray – assistant engineer; engineer ("Frost Circus", "Procession Towards Learning Land")
- Gavin Greenaway – assistant engineer
- Marcellus Frank – assistant engineer
- Mike Nocito – assistant engineer
- Ian Cooper – mastering
- David Lord – mixing ("Desert Island")
- Glenn Tommey – mixing ("Toys", "Desert Island")
- Gavin Cochrane – album sleeve photography
- Ian Hoolen – inner sleeve photography
- Ken Ansell – artwork
