= Ball and Chain (XTC song) =

Single by XTC

from the album English Settlement
- B-side: "Punch and Judy"; "Heaven is Paved With Broken Glass"
- Released: 26 February 1982
- Recorded: October – November 1981
- Studio: The Manor, Shipton-on-Cherwell, Oxfordshire, England
- Genre: Rock; pop
- Length: 4:28; 4:21 (unused single version)
- Label: Virgin Records
- Songwriter: Colin Moulding
- Producer: Hugh Padgham

XTC singles chronology
"Senses Working Overtime" (1982)	"Ball and Chain" (1982)	"No Thugs in Our House" (1982)

"Ball and Chain" is a song written by Colin Moulding of XTC for their 1982 album English Settlement. It was issued as the second single from the album on 26 February 1982, following the success of the band's biggest hit "Senses Working Overtime". The single reached No. 58 in the UK Singles Chart.

== Background ==
Colin Moulding has described the song as "a little chant from the terraces" concerning redevelopment in Swindon Town Centre. Moulding felt that "the whole Swindon area seemed to be under the hammer", citing the 1978 demolition of the Baptist Tabernacle in favour of a car park as an example. Musically, Andy Partridge has said the song was based on The Beatles' "Getting Better". Allmusic's Ned Raggett considers the song to have a "jaunty music-hall style" that "shows the band's appreciation for older styles of English pop starting to come through". Moulding has dismissed "Ball and Chain" as "not much of a song", feeling that he went "off the boil" during this period until Skylarking.

The song was first recorded at The Townhouse Studio and Air Studios in March 1981. Virgin had suggested the band record "Ball and Chain" and "Punch and Judy" with Clive Langer and Alan Winstanley, the team who produced Madness, for release as a double A-side single. Early in recording sessions, Langer walked out, apparently feeling his contribution was not needed. The band completed the recordings with Winstanley, however they were not released until 25 March 2002 on Coat of Many Cupboards. Both songs were rerecorded with Hugh Padgham producing during the sessions for English Settlement in October and November 1981. "Ball and Chain" appeared as the second track on the album, and it was backed by "Punch and Judy" and "Heaven is Paved With Broken Glass" for its single release, both songs having been recorded for but ultimately left off English Settlement. The single sleeve shows a house in Westlecott Place, Swindon whose occupant Peter Uzzell refused to move out despite every house around his being demolished. The song was played at Uzzell’s cremation ceremony in October 2018, the first piece of music played at Swindon’s North Wiltshire Crematorium. A music video was produced for the song, appearing on the 1982 home video release "Look Look".

== Reception ==
Writing for Allmusic, critic Ned Raggett noted an "increasing skill" in Moulding's vocal delivery. He praised the "sheer joy" of the song's arrangement and the "gloriously fun" ending. He considered the keyboard work to "date the track to an extent" but called it "yet another XTC classic".

== Personnel ==
- Colin Moulding – lead and backing vocals, fretless bass
- Andy Partridge – electric guitar, backing vocals
- Dave Gregory – electric 12–string guitar, mini–Korg, backing vocals
- Terry Chambers – drums and percussion, backing vocals
- Hugh Padgham – vocal support

== Charts ==
Chart (1982)	Peak position
Australia (Kent Music Report)	97
UK (Official Charts Company)	58
