= White Music =

Studio album by XTC
- Released: 20 January 1978
- Recorded: 28 April–7 October 1977
- Studios: The Manor (Shipton-on-Cherwell, England)
- Genres: Post-punk; new wave; art pop
- Length: 35:44
- Label: Virgin
- Producer: John Leckie

XTC chronology
3D EP (1977)	White Music (1978)	Go 2 (1978)

Singles from White Music
- 1. "Statue of Liberty" Released: 6 January 1978; 2. "This Is Pop" Released: 20 January 1978

White Music is the debut studio album by the English rock band XTC, released on 20 January 1978. It was the follow-up to their debut EP, 3D EP, released three months earlier. White Music reached No. 38 in the UK Albums Chart and spawned the single "Statue of Liberty", which was banned by BBC Radio 1 for the lyric "In my fantasy I sail beneath your skirt". In April 1978, the group rerecorded "This Is Pop" as their third single.

Originally titled Black Music, referring to black comedy, the title was changed at the suggestion of both Virgin Records and the band's manager. The resultant title, White Music, refers to white noise.

== Background ==
In 2014, Stereogum described the album as a "collection of scratchy, hyperactive post-punk". The track "Radios in Motion" has become one of the band's better-known songs. In a 2009 interview, Andy Partridge stated, "We couldn't think of any better way to start off our first album than with the 'kick the door in', breezy opener we used in our live set... the lyrics are very silly, picked for their sonic effect rather than meaning. The first refuge of an inexperienced songwriter, forgive me, but they do have a youthful scattergun energy." The song is considered representative of the band's "agitated amphetamine rock" style of their earlier works, though others would call it "relatively tame mod-pop". The song mentions Milwaukee in the lyrics because Partridge's aunt lived in that city.

== Critical reception ==
Professional ratings
Review scores
Source	Rating
AllMusic	3/5 stars
Chicago Tribune	3/4 stars
Christgau's Record Guide	B+
Q	3/5 stars
The Rolling Stone Album Guide	3.5/5 stars
Sounds	5/5 stars
Spin Alternative Record Guide	6/10

Village Voice critic Robert Christgau felt "Radios in Motion", "Statue of Liberty" and "This Is Pop" were aimed squarely at the American market, and that Partridge failed on the latter because "radio programmers resent anyone telling them their business." Conversely, he opined that Colin Moulding's songs were "aimed at bored Yes fans, which is why he missed—the lad doesn't know that Yes fans like being bored."

In a retrospective review for AllMusic, Chris Woodstra said, "More dissonant than their latter period, the young band shines with directionless energy and a good sense of humor." Greg Kot of the Chicago Tribune later called the album "quirky" and "pithy", while Annie Zaleski of Salon later deemed it "a giddy and (yes) impossible-to-pigeonhole debut" that's "exhilarating and, truth be told, almost exhausting to absorb, simply because it's so relentless and energetic."

White Music achieved modest success, charting in the Top 40 on the UK album charts, although its singles failed to chart. The band performed "Radios in Motion", "I'll Set Myself on Fire" and "Statue of Liberty" on BBC Two's The Old Grey Whistle Test on 14 February 1978.

== Track listing ==
All tracks are written by Andy Partridge, except where noted.

Side one
No.	Title	Writer(s)	Length
1.	"Radios in Motion"		2:52
2.	"Cross Wires"	Colin Moulding	2:03
3.	"This Is Pop"		2:38
4.	"Do What You Do"	Moulding	1:14
5.	"Statue of Liberty"		2:52
6.	"All Along the Watchtower"	Bob Dylan	5:40

Side two
No.	Title	Writer(s)	Length
1.	"Into the Atom Age"		2:32
2.	"I'll Set Myself on Fire"	Moulding	3:00
3.	"I'm Bugged"		3:59
4.	"New Town Animal in a Furnished Cage"		1:51
5.	"Spinning Top"		2:38
6.	"Neon Shuffle"		4:25

2001 CD bonus tracks
No.	Title	Writer(s)	Original release	Length
13.	"Science Friction"		3D EP, 1977	3:13
14.	"She's So Square"		3D EP	3:06
15.	"Dance Band"	Moulding	3D EP	2:41
16.	"Hang on to the Night"		B-side of "Statue of Liberty", 1978	2:09
17.	"Heatwave"	Moulding	B-side of "This Is Pop?", 1978	2:12
18.	"Traffic Light Rock"		White Music outtake; from Guillotine, various artists compilation album, 1978	1:40
19.	"Instant Tunes"	Moulding	B-side of "Are You Receiving Me?", 1978	2:34

- CD issues prior to 2001 placed the bonus tracks between the original sides one and two of the album.
- Original release information for bonus tracks sourced from Chalkhills and Children (1992), by Chris Twomey, except where noted.

== Personnel ==
XTC

- Andy Partridge – guitar, harmonica, vocals
- Colin Moulding – bass guitar, vocals
- Barry Andrews – piano, organ
- Terry Chambers – drums

Technical

- John Leckie – producer, engineer
- Alan "Jaffa" Douglas – tape operator
- Dennis Morris – photography
