= Towers of London (song) =

Single by XTC

from the album Black Sea
- Released: 10 October 1980
- Recorded: 1980
- Studio: Townhouse Studios, London
- Genre: Post-punk; pop
- Length: 5:24 (album version); 4:38 (single version); 6:07 (rejected single version)
- Label: Virgin
- Songwriter(s): Andy Partridge
- Producer(s): Steve Lillywhite

XTC singles chronology
| "Generals and Majors" (1980) | "Towers of London" (1980) | "Too Many Cooks in the Kitchen" (1982) |

"Towers of London" is a song written by Andy Partridge of the English rock band XTC, released as the second single from their 1980 album Black Sea. It peaked at number 31 on the UK Singles Chart. The BBC-2 documentary XTC at the Manor featured the group recording the song in the studio. Partridge later reflected that he may have been "subconsciously" trying to rewrite the Beatles' "Rain", desiring "clangorous guitars crashing together, and sort of droning." The night after John Lennon was killed, XTC played a gig at Liverpool, where they performed both "Towers of London" and "Rain" in tribute to the Beatle.

== Charts ==
| Chart (1980) | Peak position |
|---|---|
| UK Singles (OCC) | 31 |

== See also ==
- Beatlesque
- Tower of London
