= 3D EP =

EP by XTC
- Released: 7 October 1977
- Recorded: April 28–30, 1977
- Studio: Abbey Road Studios, London
- Length: 9:24
- Label: Virgin
- Producer: John Leckie

XTC chronology
3D EP (1977)	White Music (1978)

3D EP (stylised as 3D • EP) is the debut EP by English rock band XTC, released on 7 October 1977 through Virgin Records. The songs were recorded and mixed at Abbey Road Studios with production and engineering by John Leckie. "I'm Bugged" and "New Town Animal in a Furnished Cage" were also recorded at these sessions and these versions later appeared on their debut studio album White Music (1978). Promotional videos were made for "Science Friction", "She's So Square" and "Dance Band". These same songs appeared on the White Music CD as bonus tracks.

The Da Capo Companion to 20th-century Popular Music (1995) writes that the album and "particularly its lead track 'Science Friction' set the tone for the early part of XTC's career, with Partridge's fondness for puns (exemplified by the band's name) and both his and Moulding's pop sensibilities to the fore, backed by Andrews' quirky keyboard style."

== Track listing ==
Side one
No.	Title	Writer(s)	Length
1.	"Science Friction"	Andy Partridge	3:12

Side two
No.	Title	Writer(s)	Length
1.	"She's So Square"	Partridge	3:06
2.	"Dance Band" (Contains the brief bonus track "Goodnight, Sucker")	Colin Moulding	2:40

== Personnel ==
- Andy Partridge – guitar and vocals
- Barry Andrews – piano and organ
- Colin Moulding – bass and vocals
- Terry Chambers – drums and vocals
