= Generals and Majors =

Single by XTC

from the album Black Sea
- B-side: "Don't Lose Your Temper"
- Released: August 1980
- Recorded: 1980
- Genre: Pop; post-punk
- Length: 4:05 (album version); 3:42 (single version); 5:02 (rehearsal tape version)
- Label: Virgin
- Songwriter: Colin Moulding
- Producer: Steve Lillywhite

XTC singles chronology
"Wait Till Your Boat Goes Down" (1980)	"Generals and Majors" (1980)	"Towers of London" (1980)

Music video
- "Generals and Majors" on YouTube

"Generals and Majors" is a song written by Colin Moulding of the English rock band XTC, released as the first single from their 1980 album Black Sea. Moulding accordingly wrote the song as a satirical take on the phrase "oh, what a lovely war". The song charted in the UK single chart at No. 32 and No. 104 on the US singles chart, while reaching No. 28 on Billboard's Album Rock Tracks chart. It was the first XTC single to chart in the U.S., and it also had chart success in Canada, Australia and New Zealand.

The track was initially released as a double 7" single with a gatefold sleeve, limited to 15,000 copies. The additional record featured Moulding's "Smokeless Zone" and Partridge's "The Somnambulist".

== Music video ==
The music video shows the band playing servers and a group of men in military uniforms; one of them is Richard Branson, driving a Go-kart and jumping on a bouncy castle. According to Andy Partridge, Branson appeared "because he's a complete publicity hog. He decided he was gonna turn up and keep suggesting that he be in the video. That is the worst video ever made by man."

== Personnel ==
XTC

- Andy Partridge
- Colin Moulding
- Dave Gregory
- Terry Chambers

== Charts ==
Chart (1980)	Peak position
Australia (Kent Music Report)	24
Canadian Single Chart	92
New Zealand Single Chart	16
UK Singles Chart	32
US Billboard Bubbling Under Hot 100	104
US Billboard Album Rock Tracks	28

== See also ==
- List of anti-war songs
