= Senses Working Overtime =

1982 single by XTC

Single by XTC

from the album English Settlement
- Released: 8 January 1982
- Recorded: 1981
- Studio: The Manor, Shipton-on-Cherwell, Oxfordshire, England
- Genre: New wave; progressive pop
- Length: 4:53 (album version); 4:34 (single version); 3:32 (early tape version)
- Label: Virgin
- Songwriter: Andy Partridge
- Producers: Hugh Padgham, XTC

XTC singles chronology
"Respectable Street" (1981)	"Senses Working Overtime" (1982)	"Ball and Chain" (1982)

Audio sample
- file; help

Audio video
- "Senses Working Overtime" on YouTube

"Senses Working Overtime" is a song written by Andy Partridge of the English rock band XTC, released as the lead single from their 1982 album English Settlement. He based the song on Manfred Mann's "5-4-3-2-1" (1964). The album and single became the highest-charting records XTC would ever have in the UK, peaking at number five and number 10, respectively.

At the suggestion of its director, the song's music video was filmed at double-speed and then slowed down, to make the musicians appear "more graceful". Partridge recalled: "That one was done really quickly, in Shepperton Studios while we were rehearsing for the English Settlement tour. And so that's us rehearsing. ... [The half-speed idea has] been used a hell of a lot since then, but I think we were the first ones to do it."

== Track listing ==
1. "Senses Working Overtime" (Andy Partridge)
2. "Blame the Weather" (Colin Moulding)
3. "Tissue Tigers (The Arguers)" (Partridge)

On the 12" release, "Egyptian Solution (Thebes in a Box) (Homo Safari #3)" (Partridge) was added to the A-side as track 2; the B-side comprised "Blame the Weather" and "Tissue Tigers" on both 7" and 12".

== Personnel ==
XTC

- Terry Chambers – drums, drum synthesiser
- Dave Gregory – electric 12–string guitar, percussion
- Colin Moulding – fretless bass, backing vocals
- Andy Partridge – lead and backing vocals, acoustic guitar

== Charts ==
=== Weekly charts ===
Chart (1982)	Peak position
Australia (Kent Music Report)	12
Belgium (Ultratop 50 Flanders)	31
Ireland (IRMA)	15
Netherlands (Single Top 100)	34
New Zealand (Recorded Music NZ)	37
UK Singles (Official Charts)	10
US Mainstream Rock Airplay (Billboard)	38

=== Year-end charts ===
Chart (1982)	Rank
Australia (Kent Music Report)	97

== Notable cover versions ==
- 1995: Spacehog, A Testimonial Dinner: The Songs of XTC
