= Finn Andrews =

British/New Zealand musician

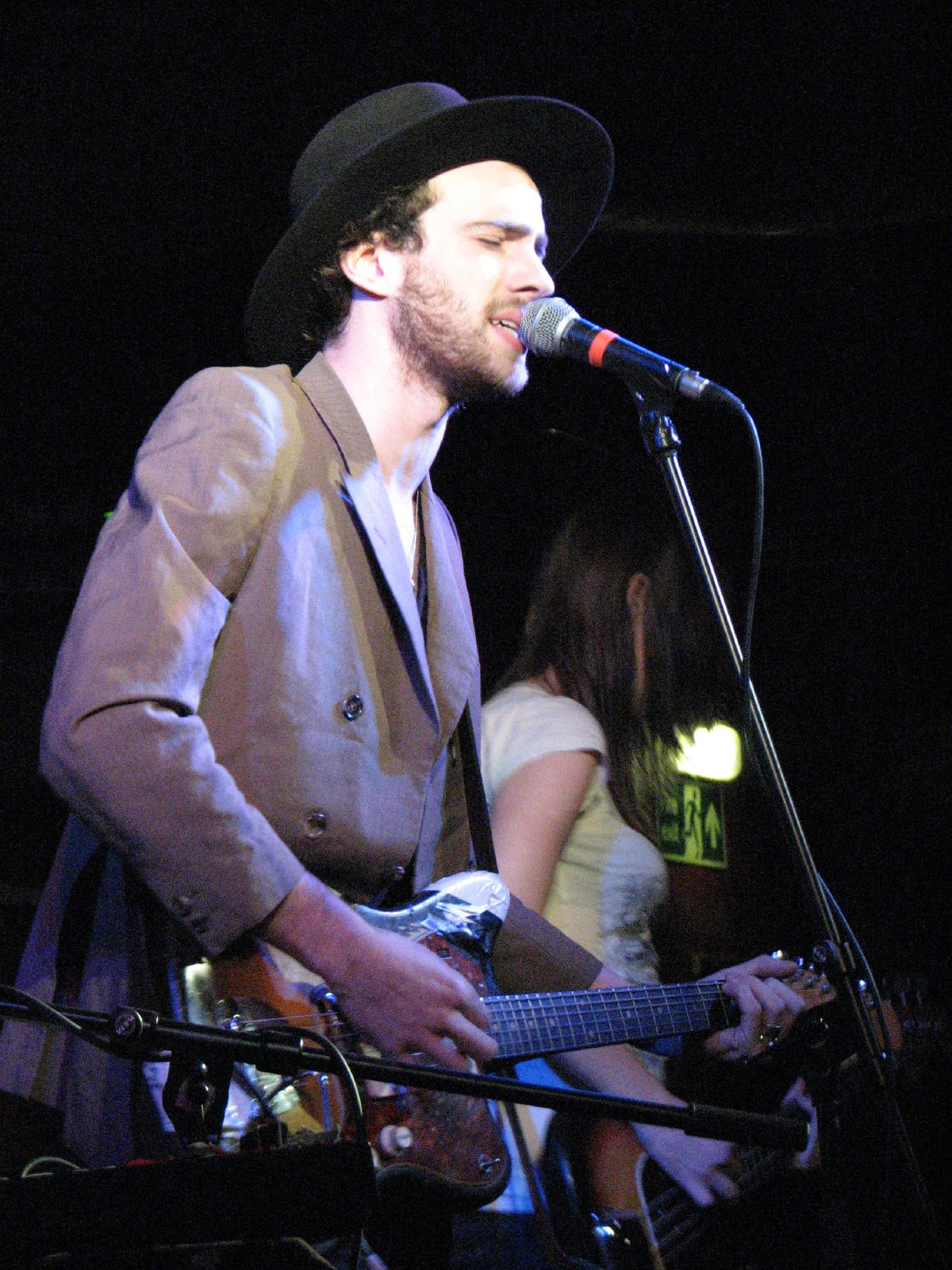

Background information
- Born: Finn William Riddley Kent Andrews; 24 August 1983 (age 43); London, England
- Occupations: Musician, singer, songwriter, producer
- Instruments: Vocals, guitar, piano
- Years active: 2001–present
- Labels: Rough Trade, Blanco Y Negro, Nettwerk
- Website: www.theveils.com

Finn Andrews (born 24 August 1983) is a British/New Zealand musician. He is a solo artist and lead singer and songwriter of London-based rock band The Veils. His father Barry Andrews is a current member of Shriekback, was a member of XTC, and also played with Iggy Pop, Robert Fripp and David Bowie.

Finn was born in Kentish Town, London and grew up between his father in London and his mother, an English and Sociology professor in Auckland, New Zealand. He attended Takapuna Grammar School during his teens where he met The Veils bass player Sophia Burn, before leaving for London shortly after his 16th birthday to make The Veils debut album The Runaway Found.

As of 2016, he has released five records with The Veils: The Runaway Found (2004), Nux Vomica (2006), Sun Gangs (2009), Time Stays, We Go (2013), and Total Depravity (2016). He's known for his extremely cathartic live performances and his unique singing voice guesting on albums by Brian Eno, Shriekback and The Mint Chicks on backing vocals. In 2011, Finn started his own record label Pitch Beast Records to release The Veils fourth studio album Time Stays, We Go.

In 2014, Finn Andrews revealed that as well as writing The Veils new record, he had also been commissioned to write an orchestral piece to commemorate the antipodean dead of World War I in Belgium in 2016.

In 2017, Finn appeared in David Lynch's new series of Twin Peaks performing "Axolotl".

== Guitars and equipment used ==
Since The Veils formed in 2004 Finn has predominantly used Fender electric guitars and Gibson acoustic guitars, specifically a 1960s Fender Jazzmaster, Fender Jaguar and a 1960s Gibson Dove acoustic. During the 'Time Stays, We Go' tour in 2013 he also began using a 1960s Gibson ES-355. He uses very few guitar pedals generally restricted to just a Boss tuner, Diamond Delay and a Crowther Audio Hot-Cake Overdrive. Finn uses vintage Fender Deluxe Reverb Amplifiers in the studio and a reissue for touring purposes.

== Discography ==
=== Studio albums with The Veils ===
Title	Released	Label	Format
The Runaway Found	16 February 2004	Rough Trade	CD, LP
Nux Vomica	18 September 2006	Rough Trade	CD, LP
Sun Gangs	6 April 2009	Rough Trade	CD, LP
Time Stays, We Go	29 April 2013	Pitch Beast	CD, LP, download
Total Depravity	26 August 2016	Nettwerk Records	CD, LP, download
...And Out of the Void Came Love	3 March 2023	Ba Da Bing!	CD, LP, download
Asphodels	24 Jan 2024	V2	CD, LP, download
Fragile World	19 June 2026	V2	CD, LP, download

=== EPs ===
Title	Released	Label	Format
Troubles of the Brain	24 January 2011	Pitch Beast	CD, download
Live at Abbey Road	29 April 2013	Pitch Beast	CD, download
Acoustic Session at Roundhead	14 April 2017	Nettwerk Records	Download
Swimming with the Crocodiles	8 September 2017	Nettwerk Records	Download

=== Studio solo albums ===
Title	Released	Label	Format
One Piece at a Time	15 March 2019	Nettwerk Records	CD, LP, download
