= ...And Out of the Void Came Love =

2023 album by the Veils

Studio album by the Veils
- Released: 3 March 2023
- Length: 57:25
- Label: Ba Da Bing Records; Banished from the Universe
- Producer: Tom Healy

The Veils chronology
Total Depravity (2016)	...And Out of the Void Came Love (2023)

Singles from ...And Out of the Void Came Love
- 1. "Undertow" Released: 11 November 2022; 2. "No Limit of Stars" Released: 7 December 2022; 3. "Time" Released: 1 January 2023; 4. "Bullfighter (Hand of God)" Released: 24 January 2023

...And Out of the Void Came Love is the sixth studio album by English-New Zealand rock band the Veils. The double album was the band's first in seven years, and includes a cover of Shriekback's "Cradle Song", a song originally written about Finn Andrews by his father Barry Andrews, which Andrews covered to commemorate the birth of his daughter.

== Production ==
In 2018, band vocalist Finn Andrews returned from the United Kingdom to Auckland, New Zealand, in order to record his solo album One Piece at a Time (2019), later deciding to relocate permanently to New Zealand. Andrews broke his wrist during the album's tour, causing him to take his first break from touring in 20 years. Much of the album was written during the 2020 COVID-19 pandemic, during which Andrews was anticipating the birth of his daughter.

The album was recorded at Roundhead Studios, Paquin Studios, The Lab, Auckland and the Massey Performing Arts Center; all locations in Auckland, New Zealand. All songs on the album were written by Andrews, except for "Cradle Song", which is a cover of the 1984 song by Shriekback. As Andrews' father Barry Andrews had originally written the song to commemorate the birth of his son, Andrews decided to record a cover of the song to commemorate the birth of his own daughter.

== Release and promotion ==
"Undertow" was released as the first single from the album on 11 November 2022, paired with the official announcement of the album. "Undertow" was followed by three further singles: "No Limit of Stars" in December, "Time" on 1 January, and "Bullfighter (Hand of God)" in late January.

The band performed a nine date tour of New Zealand in March and April, ending at The Powerstation in Auckland on 1 April 2023. This was followed by a 12-date European tour in June, which saw the band perform in the United Kingdom, Belgium, France, the Netherlands, Germany and Portugal.

== Track listing ==
...And Out of the Void Came Love track listing
No.	Title	Writer(s)	Length
1.	"Time"	Finn Andrews	5:49
2.	"No Limit of Stars"	Andrews	3:30
3.	"Undertow"	Andrews	4:55
4.	"Bullfighter (Hand of God)"	Andrews	3:36
5.	"The World of Invisible Things"	Andrews	4:27
6.	"Epoch"	Andrews	2:32
7.	"Diamonds and Coal"	Andrews	4:17
8.	"Rings of Saturn"	Andrews	3:53
9.	"Made from Love with Far to Go"	Andrews	3:48
10.	"The Pearl (Part II)"	Andrews	4:21
11.	"Someday My Love Will Come"	Andrews	3:22
12.	"The Day I Meet My Murderer"	Andrews	2:32
13.	"Between the Ocean and the Storm"	Andrews	2:41
14.	"I've Been Waiting"	Andrews	3:11
15.	"Cradle Song"	Barry Andrews; Carl Marsh; Dave Allen	3:41
Total length:			57:25

== Credits and personnel ==
- Finn Andrews – vocals, guitar, piano, synthesizer [Minimoog], organ [Hammond B3]
- Robert Ashworth – violin (1–2)
- Cass Basil – bass, double bass, backing vocals
- Ashley Brown – cello, backing band
- Brendon Cleaver – design
- Alex Corbett – recording assistant
- Alex Freer – drums, percussion (1)
- Liam Gerrard – piano, mellotron, cover
- Amalia Hall – violin, backing band
- Mike Hall – double bass
- Tom Healy – producer, engineer, mixing, guitar, lap steel guitar, synthesizer, organ
- Paddy Hill – recording assistant
- Victoria Kelly – string arrangement
- Dave Khan – synthesizer (3), violin (1)
- Somi Kim – piano, backing band
- Jessica MacCormick – photography
- Steven Marr – recording assistant
- Francesco Mazzola – artwork
- Joseph McCallum – drums, percussion
- Jol Mulholland – nylon guitar
- NZTrio – backing band
- Dan Raishbrook – electric guitar, baritone guitar, pedal steel guitar
- Liu-Yi Rettalick – violin (1–2)
- Smoke Fairies – backing vocals

== Charts ==
Weekly chart performance for ...And Out of the Void Came Love
Chart (2023)	Peak position
New Zealand Albums (RMNZ)	13
