= Naked Apes and Pond Life =

Studio album by Shriekback
- Released: 2000
- Recorded: 1995
- Genre: World, electronic rock
- Label: Mushroom Records
- Producer: Ian Shaw, Markus Dravs

Shriekback chronology
Sacred City (1992)	Naked Apes and Pond Life (2000)	Having a Moment (2003)

Professional ratings
Review scores
Source	Rating
AllMusic	2.5/5 stars
The Encyclopedia of Popular Music	3/5 stars

Naked Apes and Pond Life is the eighth full-length album by Shriekback. The 2000 release was a surprise resurfacing for the band, after many years of quiet. It gathered many songs performed in intimate appearances in London over the preceding years, recorded in the studio by Barry Andrews, Martyn Barker, Lu Edmonds (last seen on 1985's Oil & Gold), as well as Simon Edwards and Mark Raudva.

Many of the tracks are instrumentals, but the vocal-driven "Berlin" and Big Night Music-esque "Everything's on Fire" are standouts.

== Critical reception ==
AllMusic wrote that "much of Naked Apes & Pond Life finds Shriekback playing a sort of twisted world music that resembles the organic/electronic mix of Big Night Music but adds a variety of exotic instruments and percussion."

== Track listing ==
1. "Stimulate the Beaded Hamster" - 1:17
2. "Pond Life" - 4:05
3. "Hostage" - 4:12
4. "Invisible Rays" - 3:48
5. "Claxon Bolus" - 1:36
6. "Massive Custard" - 1:44
7. "JP8" - 2:17
8. "Unsong" - 4:50
9. "Berlin" - 4:12
10. "Baby Lion" - 3:00
11. "Everything's on Fire" - 4:26
12. "Keep-Net Stevenson" - 1:42
13. "String, Sedatives, Weaponry" - 3:26
14. "Anal Piss-Machine" - 1:34

== Personnel ==
- Barry Andrews - keyboards, synthesizers, accordion, vocals
- Martyn Barker - drums, percussion
- Lu Edmonds - guitar, saz, oud, percussion
- Simon Edwards - bass, sintir, percussion
- Mark Raudva - bodhrán, didgeridoo, mandolin, percussion
