= Bill Price (producer) =

Musical artist (1944-2016)

- Born: 3 September 1944
- Died: 22 December 2016 (aged 72)
- Occupations: Record producer; engineer
- Years active: 1965–2016

Bill Price (3 September 1944 – 22 December 2016) was an English record producer and audio engineer who worked with the Clash, the Sex Pistols, Guns N' Roses, Sparks, the Jesus and Mary Chain, Nymphs, the Waterboys, Mott the Hoople and Simon Townshend (Pete Townshend's younger brother). He was chief engineer on the first three solo studio albums by Pete Townshend: Empty Glass (1980), All the Best Cowboys Have Chinese Eyes (1982) and White City: A Novel (1985).

He contributed to documentaries about the Clash such as Westway to the World (2000). Price started his audio engineering career in the mid-1960s when he was an engineer at Decca Studios in West Hampstead, recording artists such as Tom Jones.

One of the final recordings he helped engineer at Decca before departing to AIR Studios in November 1969 was the multi-million-selling "Reflections of My Life" by Marmalade.

Price helped build AIR Studios in Oxford Street, where he spent many years. During that time he engineered some of the major albums of the 1970s and 1980s.

== Sex Pistols ==
In 1976, he was asked by Malcolm McLaren to produce the Sex Pistols' sessions that became their only studio album Never Mind the Bollocks, Here's the Sex Pistols (1977). His work with the band led to one of his most curious album credits, alongside Chris Thomas. Price explained:

The simple facts of the matter were that Chris was hired by Malcolm (McLaren) to do a series of singles for the Sex Pistols. I was hired by Malcolm to do a series of album tracks with the Sex Pistols. Life got slightly complicated because I did a few album tracks that Chris remade as singles. Also, Chris started a couple of tracks, which got abandoned as singles, which I remade to be used as album tracks. On quite a large number of songs, when we'd finished the album, we had two versions of the song. I couldn't quite understand why Malcolm kept chopping and changing between different versions of different songs. It slowly dawned on Chris and myself that Malcolm was trying to slip between two stools and not pay Chris or me. So we said, "I'll tell you what, Malcolm. Whatever's on the Sex Pistols' album, it was either done by me or Chris, and you can pay us and we'll divvy it out amongst our little selves." Which is what we did. But it did force that very strange credit, simply because the sleeve was printed long before it was finally decided which version of each individual song was on the record. If we'd known, it would have said 'produced by Bill Price' or 'produced by Chris Thomas'. That's how you ended up with that credit, 'produced by Bill Price or Chris Thomas'.

During the media furore over the Sex Pistol's single "God Save the Queen", Price, Thomas and Pistols' vocalist Johnny Rotten were subject to a razor attack outside a pub in Highbury, London.

== Other work ==
Price also mixed Harry Nilsson's "Without You".

He was the chief engineer and manager at Wessex Studios, the London studio where the Clash and the Sex Pistols recorded much of their work.

More recently he worked again with Mick Jones in his band Carbon/Silicon, and mixed the Veils' studio albums Nux Vomica (2006) and Time Stays, We Go (2013).
