= Sacred City =

Studio album by Shriekback
- Released: 1992
- Recorded: January – May 1992
- Studio: The Stone Room, London
- Genre: Pop rock
- Label: Shriek Records; World Domination Records
- Producer: Barry Andrews; Ian Caple

Shriekback chronology
Go Bang! (1988)	Sacred City (1992)	Naked Apes and Pond Life (2000)

Sacred City is the seventh full-length album by Shriekback. Released in 1992, after the failure of 1988's Go Bang!, the album was much more experimental, returning to the original Shriekback sound. Barry Andrews was again joined by founder, Dave Allen, and longtime collaborator Martyn Barker, as well as Karl Hyde. With little commercial success, the band dissolved shortly after the album's release.

A companion film, also called Sacred City, was offered in a limited home-video release.

== Critical reception ==
AllMusic's Jason Ankeny said that "the advantages of 20/20 hindsight proves the group to have been well ahead of their time, their music predating the subsequent rise of electronica via its use of dub and drum'n'bass-styled sampled rhythms... Sacred City lacks the ingenious spark of such peak Shriekback efforts as Oil and Gold and Big Night Music, but their intellectual art-funk always makes for intriguing listening." Spin magazine featured it in their "Heavy Rotation" column of staff favourites, with Staci Bonner describing it as an "evocative concept album exploring the myths of cities around the world". Jim Sullivan of The Boston Globe called Sacred City "a probing, atmospheric album -- not unlike some of Peter Gabriel's music" but noted that it had only sold "a modest 30,000 copies." Writing for The Seattle Times, Ken Hunt remarked on the use of "tribalistic drumming" and summarized the album as "a thematically unified collection of songs analyzing what urban life is all about." In the Los Angeles Times Mike Boehm observed that the album's songs "have a restrained, night-time mood, and aren't supremely catchy or readily danceable" but recommended Sacred City as "a worthwhile album to chew on."

== Track listing ==
All tracks written by Shriekback (Dave Allen, Barry Andrews, Martyn Barker)

1. "Signs" – 4:18
2. "Psycho Drift" – 3:54
3. "The Bastard Sons of Enoch" – 5:05
4. "(Open Up Your) Filthy Heart (To Me)" – 5:05
5. "Exquisite Corpse" – 4:20
6. "Below" – 4:35
7. "Beatles Zebra Crossing?" – 4:04
8. "Hymn to the Local Gods" – 4:29
9. "Every Force Evolves a Form" – 5:27
10. "3 A.M." – 5:05

== Personnel ==
Shriekback

- Barry Andrews – keyboards, synthesizers, vocals, co-producer
- Dave Allen – bass
- Martyn Barker – drums

Additional personnel

- Kat Evans – violin on "Every Force Evolves a Form"
- Lu Edmonds – guitar on "Signs"
- Karl Hyde – guitar
- John Kline – guitar
- Sarah Partridge – backing vocals
- Wendy Partridge – backing vocals
- Mark Raudva – didgeridoo, percussion
- Ian Caple – engineer, co-producer
