= Exquisite corpse (disambiguation) =

Exquisite corpse is a surrealist technique.

Exquisite corpse may also refer to:

== Literature ==
- Exquisite Corpse (magazine), edited by Andrei Codrescu
- Exquisite Corpse (novel), a 1996 novel by Poppy Z. Brite
- Exquisite Corpse, a novel by Robert Irwin
- The Exquisite Corpse, a novel by Alfred Chester

== Music ==
- eXquisite CORpsE, a musical group related to Psychick Warriors ov Gaia
- Exquisite Corpse (album), by Daedelus
- Exquisite Corpse (EP), a 2009 EP by Warpaint
- "Exquisite Corpse" (Bauhaus song), from the album The Sky's Gone Out
- "Exquisite Corpse" (Shriekback song), from the album Sacred City
- "Exquisite Corpse" (Stephen Trask song), from the rock musical Hedwig and the Angry Inch
- "Exquisite Corpse" (George Watsky song), bonus track from the album x Infinity

== Film ==
- Exquisite Corpse (film), a 2010 horror film
