= Jam Science =

- Y edition

Studio album by Shriekback
- Released: 1984
- Studio: Regents Park Studio, Primrose Hill, London
- Genre: New wave
- Length: 33:19 (Y); 39:58 (Arista)
- Label: Y, Arista
- Producer: Barry Andrews (for Y); Shriekback and Paul "Groucho" Smykle (for Arista)

Shriekback chronology
Care (1983)	Jam Science (1984)	Oil & Gold (1985)

Alternative cover
- Arista edition

Jam Science is the third studio album by English pop group Shriekback. It was released in two versions in 1984 and was reissued on CD in a two-disc special release from the band themselves in 2014, the second disc being a live show at Hatfield.

The first edition, issued on Y Records in early 1984, was the final release by the label. As the company's final activity, label owner Dick O'Dell assembled an unfinished version of the album from rough mixes without the group's permission; however, as the album was contractually recorded for the label, it is not an unauthorised release. Y was a UK record company, but this album was manufactured and distributed in the Netherlands by Sound Products Holland BV and was out of print by the time the second edition was released. The second edition, issued on Arista Records in late 1984, is the version sanctioned by the group. It reached number 85 in the UK album chart; "Hand on My Heart" and "Mercy Dash" were also issued as singles, both on Arista, with the former reaching number 52 in the UK singles chart.

== Differences between Y and Arista editions ==
Each edition contains tracks not found on the other, as well as alternate recordings and mixes.

"International" and "Putting on the Pressure" can be found only on the Y edition and have never been reissued. "Achtung", "Mercy Dash", "Suck" and "Hubris" can be found only on the Arista edition. "Building up a New Home" and "Party Line" (on Y) are retitled "Newhome" and "Partyline" (on Arista).

The Arista version of "Under the Lights" includes additional overdubs, truncates the rapping section and last chorus, and ends with a coda of unaccompanied, distorted vocal. The Y version's coda is similar to the mix of the rest of the song; both versions are made from the same basic recording.

The Arista version of "Newhome" has a shorter instrumental break near the end, and vocals are completely re-recorded.

The Arista version of "Hand on My Heart" is completely re-recorded at a faster tempo with a preview of the chorus's backing vocals in the introduction, which was absent on the Y version.

The Arista version of "Partyline" omits an extra repeat of the chorus near the end. Vocals have been re-recorded, and there are additional overdubs.

"My Careful Hands" fades out earlier on the Arista version and is a significantly different mix, but it is made from the same basic recording as the Y version.

"Midnight Maps" is the only track that is essentially the same on both editions, although the Arista version is probably a remix.

The album title is printed as one word, Jamscience, on the cover of the first edition (front and spine), but as two words on the label. It is spelled consistently as two words on the Arista edition. The Y edition's cover shows a group lineup of three musicians with Martyn Barker (drums) included in a list of additional musicians; the Arista edition declares a lineup of four musicians including Barker, although he plays on only two tracks. The Y edition credits Barry Andrews as the producer, while the Arista edition credits Shriekback with Paul "Groucho" Smykle.

The two editions have completely different covers. The Y edition uses a graphic of a comical anthropomorphic wood screw.

== Track listings ==
=== Y edition ===
All tracks credited to Shriekback.

==== Side one ====
1. "Under the Lights" – 4:01
2. "Building up a New Home" – 3:51
3. "Hand on My Heart" – 4:40
4. "International" – 3:28

==== Side two ====
1. "Putting on the Pressure" – 4:31
2. "Party Line" – 4:12
3. "My Careful Hands" – 4:22
4. "Midnight Maps" – 4:14

=== Arista edition ===
Composed by Dave Allen, Barry Andrews, Carl Marsh; except * by Allen, Andrews, Martyn Barker, Marsh.

==== Side one ====
1. "Hand on My Heart" – 3:49
2. "Newhome" – 3:38
3. "Achtung" – 4:20
4. "Partyline" – 3:29
5. "Midnight Maps" – 4:09 *

==== Side two ====
1. "Mercy Dash" – 4:04 *
2. "Under the Lights" – 3:17
3. "My Careful Hands" – 3:52
4. "Suck" – 5:28
5. "Hubris" – 3:52

=== Remastered edition, released by the band in 2014 in extremely limited quantities, with Live at Hatfield 1984 on a second disc ===
1. "Hand on My Heart" – 3:49
2. "Newhome" – 3:43
3. "Achtung" – 4:20
4. "Party Line" – 3:31
5. "Midnight Maps" – 4:14
6. "Mercy Dash" – 4:05
7. "Under the Lights" – 3:20
8. "My Careful Hands" – 3:53
9. "Suck" – 5:34
10. "Hubris" – 3:59
11. "International" – 3:28
12. "Putting on the Pressure" – 4:27
13. "Nerve" – 2:42
14. "Big Sharp Teeth" – 2:54
15. "Carrying Cameras" – 2:54
16. "Jumping on the Ribcage" (HOMH remix) – 4:58
17. "Cloud of Nails" (HOMH Remix) – 5:55
18. "Mistah Linn He Dead" (HOMH remix) – 4:05

BONUS DISC

1. "Building up a Newhome" – 5:05
2. "Mothloop" – 3:08
3. "Big Sharp Teeth" – 4:30
4. "Hand on My Heart" – 5:31
5. "A Kind of Fascination" – 3:39
6. "Health and Knowledge and Wealth and Power" – 5:45
7. "Feelers" – 5:38
8. "White Out" – 4:54
9. "Suck" – 4:49
10. "My Spine (Is the Bassline)" – 4:40
11. "Mercy Dash" – 4:40

== Personnel ==
Shriekback

- Dave Allen – bass, vocals
- Barry Andrews – keyboards, synthesizers, lead vocals on "Hubris"
- Carl Marsh – guitars, Linn drum machine, lead vocals (except on "Hubris")

Additional musicians

- Martyn Barker – Linn drum machine, percussion on "Midnight Maps" and "Mercy Dash" (credited as group member on Arista edition)
- Luc van Acker – guitars on "Partyline" and "Under the Lights"
- Ian Caple – engineer/Linn drum programming, guitars on "My Careful Hands"
- Phil Butcher – bass on "Partyline"
- Emma Burnham, Linda Neville, Paul "Groucho" Smykle – vocals
- Dave Marx, Pedro Ortiz – credited as additional musicians on Y edition
