= Oil and Gold =

Studio album by Shriekback
- Released: 1985
- Studios: Gaslight; Rockfield Studios (Monmouth, Wales)
- Genres: New wave; pop rock
- Length: 44:15
- Label: Island
- Producer: Barry Andrews

Shriekback chronology
Jam Science (1984)	Oil and Gold (1985)	Big Night Music (1986)

Singles from Oil and Gold
- 1. "Nemesis" Released: 1985; 2. "Fish Below the Ice" Released: 1985

Oil and Gold is the fourth studio album by the English rock band Shriekback, released in 1985 by Arista Records in UK and Europe, Australia and New Zealand and by Island Records in the United States,

The album is widely considered the band's highest creative moment and saw them begin a metamorphosis from funk-influenced new wave towards darker and challenging art rock. The addition of Martyn Barker on drums and Lu Edmonds on guitar gives many of the songs a harder edge, while the album also features synthesizers from Hans Zimmer, best known for his work in film music.

Oil and Gold served as a bridge between the founding trio of Barry Andrews, Carl Marsh, and Dave Allen, and a span of releases spearheaded by Andrews alone. Marsh, whose voice featured prominently on earlier releases, left the band after the recording and Andrews took over as primary vocalist. Marsh would return with the release of Having a Moment (2003), and remains involved with the band to the present day. The album's highlights include the three opening songs, sung by Marsh, and the minor hit, "Nemesis", which became the band's signature song. The album's success widened their audience significantly, and sold well in the US. Both of the singles released from the album reached the Top 100 in the UK singles chart: "Nemesis" reached number 94 and "Fish Below the Ice" reached number 88.

== Critical reception ==
Professional ratings
Review scores
Source	Rating
Allmusic	4/5 stars
Record Collector	4/5 stars

Ian Peel of Record Collector commented, "Criminally overlooked for years, here – at last – is the pivotal Shriekback album in double-disc glory. It may not have the cult appeal of Tench or Jam Science and what came before nor the commercial overload that followed it with Go Bang!, but Oil & Gold is the pivotal, mid-career opus that draws together all of this maverick band’s strengths with a mesmerising punch."

David Barton of the Sacramento Bee praised the album saying, "This arch, wiry, British art funk is reminiscent of both Gang of Four and XTC...The vocals are amelodic, showing a great debt to David Byrne's use of cadence over melody, and the backing tracks throb like accelerated Talking Heads arrangements...Heady stuff, pretentious yes, but sharp inventive and hot."

Bill Cassell of Allmusic in a 4/5 stars review, remarked "Oil and Gold is six-tenths of a great album...Still, Oil and Gold's highlights make it a rewarding listen."

== In other media ==
Two songs from the album, "This Big Hush" and "Coelocanth", were featured in Michael Mann's thriller film Manhunter (1986), starring William Petersen. "Coelocanth" was also featured in the Canadian science fiction film, Come True (2020). "Faded Flowers" was featured in Band of the Hand (1986). "This Big Hush" was also used in season 6 episode 7 of Nip/Tuck. The song "Everything That Rises Must Converge" refers to the 1963 short story of that name by Flannery O'Connor. The music video for the song "Nemesis" features the 2000 AD character Nemesis the Warlock.

== Track listing ==
All songs written by Dave Allen, Barry Andrews, Martyn Barker and Carl Marsh.

1. "Malaria" – 4:29
2. "Everything That Rises Must Converge" – 4:03
3. "Fish Below the Ice" – 4:24
4. "This Big Hush" – 6:11
5. "Faded Flowers" – 3:44
6. "Nemesis" – 3:43
7. "Only Thing That Shines" – 4:23
8. "Health and Knowledge and Wealth and Power" – 4:44
9. "Hammerheads" – 4:17
10. "Coelocanth" – 4:13

2011 bonus disc

1. "Suck" (BBC Live at Hatfield Polytechnic 1984)
2. "Mothloop" (BBC Live at Hatfield Polytechnic 1984)
3. "Feelers" (BBC Live at Hatfield Polytechnic 1984)
4. "Nemesis" (Extended Mix)
5. "Nemesis" (Arch Deviant Mix)
6. "Fish Below Ice" (7" Edit)
7. "Lined Up"
8. "My Spine (Is the Bassline)"
9. "Fish Below Ice" (Plankton Enriched Mix)
10. "Fish Below Ice" (Dance Mix)

== Personnel ==
- Barry Andrews – keyboards; synthesizers; vocals
- Carl Marsh – guitars; vocals
- Dave Allen – bass
- Martyn Barker – drums
- Lu Edmonds – guitar
- Hans Zimmer – engineering; complicated shaker on "This Big Hush"
- Ian Caple – engineer
