= Troubles of the Brain =

Troubles of the Brain EP

EP by The Veils
- Released: 24 January 2011
- Recorded: London, summer 2010
- Genre: Indie, alternative rock
- Label: Pitch Beast
- Producer: Bernard Butler, Finn Andrews

The Veils chronology
Sun Gangs (2009)	Troubles of the Brain EP (2011)

Troubles of the Brain is the first EP by the Veils, out on 24 January 2011 on Pitch Beast Records. Finn Andrews set up his own label to release the Veils' first EP after leaving Rough Trade after almost 9 years. It was recorded at Andrews' home studio in London, and produced by Andrews and Bernard Butler. The first single from the EP was "The Stars Came Out Once the Lights Went Out".

It was given a rating score of seven by PopMatters.

== Track listing ==
- CD (PITCD001)
1. "Bloom"
2. "Don't Let the Same Bee Sting You Twice"
3. "The Stars Came Out Once the Lights Went Out"
4. "The Wishbone"
5. "Grey Lynn Park"
6. "Us Godless Teenagers"
7. "Iodine and Iron (Bonus Track)"

The EP possibly takes its name from Act 5 Scene 3 of William Shakespeare's Macbeth.

MACBETH
"Cure her of that.
Canst thou not minister to a mind diseased,
Pluck from the memory a rooted sorrow,
Raze out the written troubles of the brain
And with some sweet oblivious antidote
Cleanse the stuff'd bosom of that perilous stuff
Which weighs upon the heart?"
