= Go Bang! =

Studio album by Shriekback
- Released: 1988
- Recorded: January 7–March 1, 1988
- Studio: Compass Point Studios (Bahamas)
- Genre: Modern rock
- Length: 32:40
- Label: Island
- Producer: Richard James Burgess

Shriekback chronology
Big Night Music (1986)	Go Bang! (1988)	Sacred City (1992)

Singles from Go Bang!
- 1. "Intoxication" Released: 1988; 2. "Shark Walk" Released: 1988; 3. "Get Down Tonight" Released: 1988

Go Bang! is the sixth studio album by the English rock band Shriekback, released in 1988. It produced a significant number of Billboard modern rock hits, including "Get Down Tonight", "Intoxication", and "Shark Walk". Released after the departure of founding member and bassist, Dave Allen, the album revolves around Barry Andrews.

The band was under considerable pressure from Island Records to produce a hit from this album and British hitmaker Richard James Burgess was brought in to produce and mix the album. The album is significantly more commercial than the previous or subsequent albums and this caused some tension in the studio. However, it produced the necessary hits, including lead single "Intoxication", which peaked at #6 on the newly introduced Modern Rock Tracks chart. "Get Down Tonight", a cover of the KC and the Sunshine Band track, spent 6 weeks in the Billboard Dance/Club chart, peaking at #20. The album sold well, but Joel Webber, who was the A&R man at Island, died shortly before the album was released.

Andrews returned to a more traditional Shriekback sound with 1992's Sacred City.

== Track listing ==
All songs written by Shriekback (Barry Andrews, Martyn Barker, Michael Cozzi, Sarah Partridge, Wendy Partridge), except where noted.

No.	Title	Writer(s)	Length
1.	"Intoxication"		3:44
2.	"Shark Walk"		3:57
3.	"Over the Wire"		3:28
4.	"New Man"		3:47
5.	"Nighttown"		4:11
6.	"Go Bang!"		2:21
7.	"Big Fun"		3:11
8.	"Get Down Tonight"	Harry Wayne Casey; Richard Finch	3:26
9.	"Dust and a Shadow"		4:35
Total length:			32:40

== Personnel ==
Credits adapted from the Go Bang! media notes.

Shriekback

- Barry Andrews – keyboards, vocals
- Martyn Barker – drums, percussion, programming
- Michael Cozzi – guitar
- Sarah Partridge – backing vocals
- Wendy Partridge – backing vocals

Production

- Richard James Burgess – producer, engineer, mixing, programming
- Stuart Bruce – engineer
- Alex Dee – assistant engineer

Imagery

- Stylorouge – design/art direction
- Simon Fowler – photography
