= The Veils =

English/New Zealand rock band

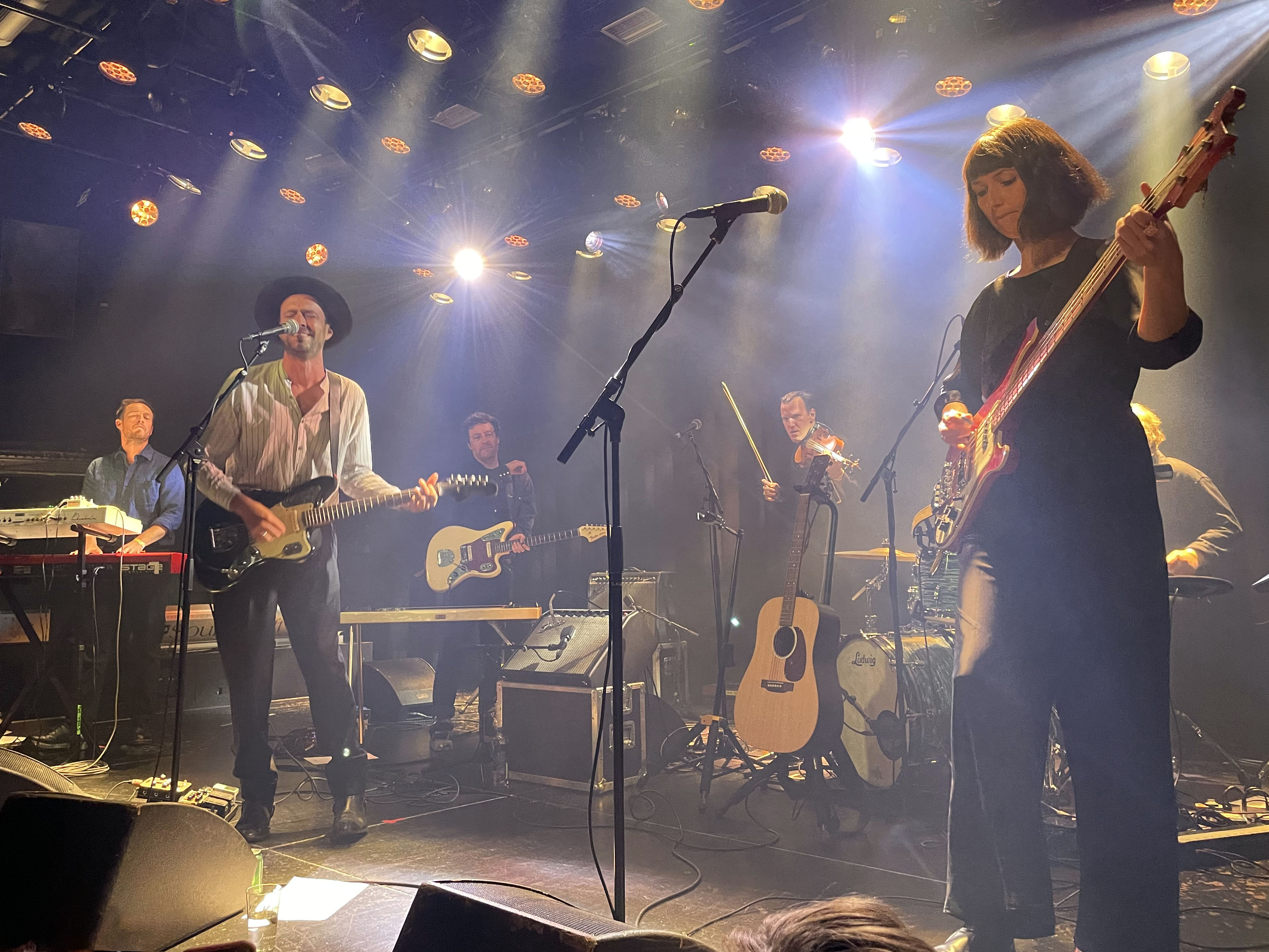
- The Veils performing at Melkweg, Amsterdam in 2023

Background information
- Origin: London, England; Auckland, New Zealand
- Genres: Alternative rock; indie rock
- Years active: 2001–present
- Labels: Rough Trade; Blanco Y Negro; Nettwerk
- Members: Finn Andrews
- Website: theveils.com

The Veils are an English/New Zealand indie/rock band fronted by singer and songwriter Finn Andrews.

== History ==
=== Early years, The Runaway Found (2001–2004) ===
Finn Andrews was born in London, the son of musician Barry Andrews, most known for his work with the bands XTC and Shriekback. Finn spent his teenage years living with his mother Vivienne and his sister in his grandmother's house in Auckland, New Zealand. Largely uninterested in school, Finn was also playing in many bands (one of which met and played regularly in a folk club on Mt Victoria in Devonport, Auckland) and writing the songs that would later comprise The Veils debut album The Runaway Found. When he was 16, a set of demos he sent to record companies created a stir and led to invitations for him to return to London and make a record.

The Veils were signed almost immediately to Blanco y Negro, an indie/major hybrid imprint led by Rough Trade's boss Geoff Travis. On 19 August 2002 the band released a promo only single "Death & Co.", while a proper commercial single release came three months later, on 18 November, for "More Heat Than Light" followed by "The Leavers Dance" (24 February 2003), which was distributed exclusively at gigs.

By then increasing contractual disparities and artistic differences between the head of Warner and Geoff Travis delayed plans for a debut album. The Blanco Y Negro label was eventually disbanded and the dispute turned into a court battle, with The Veils eventually regaining ownership of their master recordings from Warner Music. By mid-2003 Geoff Travis had signed them to Rough Trade Records.

The Veils recorded four more songs with producer Bernard Butler (ex-Suede guitarist), and the band finally released its first Rough Trade single, "Guiding Light" on 28 July 2003. Single releases of "Lavinia" (24 November 2003) and "The Wild Son" (26 January 2004) led to The Runaway Found finally hitting the shelves on 16 February 2004. Though rapturously received by the critics, by the time of its release Andrews felt unhappy with the direction the band had taken and, allegedly following altercations between him and other members, The Veils' first incarnation split mid-2004, just two months after their debut album's release.

=== Nux Vomica (2005–2006) ===
Andrews left the UK early 2005 and embarked on a solo tour of America and Japan, eventually returning home to New Zealand where he found a new direction for the band. He spent the summer there rehearsing with high-school friends Liam Gerrard (keyboards) and Sophia Burn (bass) in Liam's bedroom, soon amassing an album's worth of material. When the trio returned to London they were joined by Dan Raishbrook (guitar) and Henning Dietz (drums), who completed the new line-up. They began recording sessions with producer Nick Launay in Los Angeles in early 2006. The resulting album Nux Vomica had a darker, far heavier and more complex sound, augmented by string arrangements by ex Lounge Lizard Jane Scarpantoni, but also a newly found, highly animalistic energy. Lead singer Finn Andrews shows "rougher" and more experimental vocals on many of the songs such as 'Not Yet' and 'Jesus for the Jugular'. Two singles were released from the album: "Advice for Young Mothers to Be" (4 September 2006) and "One Night on Earth" (15 April 2007). Nux Vomica featured on 16 English and American critics' best of the year lists in 2006.

=== Sun Gangs (2007–2009) ===
In the 16 months following the release of Nux Vomica The Veils played over 250 shows across 15 countries, and during the U.S. leg of the tour it was announced that keyboardist Liam Gerrard would leave the band to return home to New Zealand for personal reasons. The Veils carried on as a four-piece and, while living out of a classic car garage in Oklahoma City, started recording new demos at The Flaming Lips studio between playing shows on the east and west coasts of America. By mid-2008 they were back in London to begin work on their third album with producer Graham Sutton. The recording sessions at West Point Studios lasted only three weeks, and at the end of the summer the album was done and ready to be mixed. Sun Gangs was released on 6 April 2009 and was featured in many websites top albums of 2009.

=== Troubles of the Brain EP (2010–2011) ===
The band spent the summer of 2010 working on new material. On 6 December it was announced that a new 7-song EP entitled Troubles of the Brain was set to be released on 24 January, and that the band had left Rough Trade after almost 9 years and started their own label, Pitch Beast Records. The EP is produced by Finn Andrews and Bernard Butler and was recorded at Finn's home studio in London. In March 2011, The Veils headlined a benefit concert for the NZ Red Cross in London, playing a selection of songs from the EP.

=== Time Stays, We Go (2013) ===
The Veils' fourth album was recorded in Laurel Canyon, Los Angeles and was released in April 2013. In January the band recorded a 5-song live session at Abbey Road Studios which was also turned into a short film and released as exclusive content with the new record.

Following their album's release The Veils embarked on a 150-date world tour with shows selling out all across North America, Europe and New Zealand.

Once the tour finished Finn Andrews revealed in an interview for NME that the band had moved into their own studio in east London and had already begun work on a new record due for release in 2016. Finn also revealed he had been commissioned to write an orchestral piece to commemorate the antipodean dead of World War I to be performed in Belgium in spring 2016.

=== Total Depravity (2016) ===
In June The Veils announced their fifth album Total Depravity was to be released on 26 August 2016. The album was recorded in Los Angeles, London, New York and Porto and features production by El-P, Adam Greenspan and Dean Hurley. The album cover features artwork by Italian artist Nicola Samori. The video for "Axolotl" was filmed on Bethells Beach in Auckland, New Zealand and features a Charles Darwin-like figure in the midst of a surreal exorcism in the desert, eventually transforming into a large tentacled figure in a hat. The Veils then announced a world tour in support of the record would begin in Europe in October.

=== Twin Peaks ===
In 2016, David Lynch announced that Finn Andrews would appear in the 3rd season of Twin Peaks. The band appeared performing the song "Axolotl" in the 15th part, aired on 21 August 2017.

=== Notable contributions and appearances ===
The Veils have been praised by film directors David Lynch, Paolo Sorrentino and Tim Burton, all of whom have used songs by them on their soundtracks. The Veils have also recently collaborated on a new album with producer El-P/Run The Jewels.

- Paolo Sorrentino used The Veils song "Nux Vomica" in its entirety in his 2008 Italian political thriller Il Divo.
- "Jesus For the Jugular" was used for the trailer of the HBO series Luck in the United States in 2011.
- Tim Burton used "Another Night on Earth" on the soundtrack for Frankenweenie.
- Lee Tamahori used "Jesus For the Jugular" in his film The Devil's Double in 2008.
- "The Valleys of New Orleans" was used repeatedly by HBO during their Hurricane Katrina fund raising campaign in 2005. The song begins with a lyric about a large hurricane tearing through New Orleans but was in fact highly prescient having been written three years prior to Katrina.
- "Vicious Traditions" was used during the end sequence of the film Mr Brooks in 2007.
- "The Stars Came Out Once The Lights Went Out" was used as the opening theme of the New Zealand comedy-drama Nothing Trivial (2011-2014).
- "Grey Lynn Park" was used in the 2011 pilot of the TV series Suits.
- "Axolotl" was used in a trailer for the 2026 MGM+ and Prime Video series Spider-Noir
- ”Low Lays the Devil” is used in S1E5 of the 2026 Disney+ Marvel Studios series Vision Quest

== Style and influences ==
Clash Music said that the Veils' "hail from the UK but frequently use Southern gothic reference points, pin-pointing a sonic universe that touches on Nick Cave, Nine Inch Nails, and industrial pioneers while still sounding thrillingly individual." Metro magazine described the band's music as having a "bruised and bruising Southern Gothic sound for badlands and backstreets" identifiable by "driving drums, bluesy melodies, a heavy foot on the sustain pedal and Andrews’ gravelly voice", as well as the band's folk music-rooted sound.

== Members ==
=== Current members ===
- Finn Andrews (2001–present)

=== Touring members (2023–present) ===
- Henning Dietz - drums
- Cass Basil – bass guitar
- Jo McCallum – drums
- Dan Raishbrook – guitar and synth
- Dave Khan – violin

=== Past members ===
- Sophia Burn – bass guitar
- Liam Gerrard - piano/organ
- Uberto Rapisardi – keyboard

== Discography ==
=== Studio albums ===
Title	Released	Label	Format
The Runaway Found	16 February 2004	Rough Trade	CD, LP
Nux Vomica	18 September 2006	Rough Trade	CD, LP
Sun Gangs	6 April 2009	Rough Trade	CD, LP
Time Stays, We Go	29 April 2013	Pitch Beast	CD, LP, download
Total Depravity	26 August 2016	Nettwerk Records	CD, LP, download
...And Out of the Void Came Love	3 March 2023	Ba Da Bing!	CD, LP, download
Asphodels	24 January 2025	V2	CD, LP, download
Fragile World	19 June 2026	V2	CD, LP, download

=== EPs ===
Title	Released	Label	Format
Troubles of the Brain	24 January 2011	Pitch Beast	CD, download
Live at Abbey Road	29 April 2013	Pitch Beast	CD, download
Acoustic Session at Roundhead	14 April 2017	Nettwerk Records	Download
Swimming with the Crocodiles	8 September 2017	Nettwerk Records	Download

=== Singles ===
Title	Year	Album
"Death & Co"	2002	Non-album single
"More Heat Than Light"	2002	The Runaway Found
"The Leavers Dance"	2003	The Runaway Found
"Guiding Light"	2003	The Runaway Found
"Lavinia"	2003	The Runaway Found
"The Wild Son"	2004	The Runaway Found
"The Tide That Left and Never Came Back"	2004	The Runaway Found
"Advice for Young Mothers to Be"	2006	Nux Vomica
"One Night on Earth"	2007	Nux Vomica
"The Letter"	2009	Sun Gangs
"Through the Deep, Dark Wood"	2013	Time Stays, We Go
"Axolotl"	2016	Total Depravity
"Low Lays the Devil"	2016	Total Depravity
"Undertow"	2022	...And Out of the Void Came Love
"No Limit of Stars"	2022	...And Out of the Void Came Love
"Time"	2023	...And Out of the Void Came Love
"Bullfighter (Hand of God)"	2023	...And Out of the Void Came Love

=== Music videos ===
Title	Year	Director
"Lavinia"	2003	Gavin Boyter
"The Tide That Left and Never Came Back"	2004	Gina Birch
"The Wild Son"	2004	Tim Groenendaal
"Advice for Young Mothers to Be"	2006	Suzanne Schurgers for Minivegas
"Calliope!"	2007	The Brownlee Brothers
"The Letter"	2009	Iain Forsyth and Jane Pollard
"Begin Again"	2009	Sean Gratton
"The Stars Came Out Once The Lights Went Out"	2011	Alexander Gandar
"Live at Abbey Road (Short Film)"	2013	Jamie Roberts
"Axolotl"	2016	Tuataroa Neill
"Low Lays the Devil"	2016	Tuataroa Neill
"No Limit of Stars"	2022	Alexander Gandar
"Time"	2022	Alexander Gandar
"The Ladder"	2024	Tuataroa Neill
