= The Runaway Found =

Studio album by the Veils
- Released: 16 February 2004
- Recorded: Great Linford Manor, 2 kHz, Parr Street, The Garden and RAK studios, London 2001–2003
- Genre: Folk rock
- Length: 40:07
- Label: Rough Trade
- Producer: Matthew Ollivier, Bernard Butler, Ken Nelson

The Veils chronology
The Runaway Found (2004)	Nux Vomica (2006)

Alternate cover
- Promotional CD

Professional ratings
Aggregate scores
Source	Rating
Metacritic	(74%)
Review scores
Source	Rating
AllMusic	3.5/5 stars
Drowned in Sound	4/5 stars
The Guardian	4/5 stars
Pitchfork	7.1/10
Playlouder	4/5 stars
Q	4/5 stars

The Runaway Found is the Veils debut album, released on 16 February 2004. The record was preceded by several singles, from "More Heat Than Light" (November 2002) to "The Wild Son" (January 2004). The last single "Lavinia" was released in November 2003, alongside a first promotional version of the album which featured a different running order and track list. In fact "...& One of Us Must Go" and "Wires to Flying Birds" did not make the final version and were later replaced by "The Wild Son" and "The Valleys of New Orleans". Because of its long gestation (the recording sessions started straight after the band's first deal with Blanco Y Negro in 2001) the record has three different producers: Matthew Ollivier (tracks 3, 4, 6, 9, 10), Bernard Butler (tracks 1, 2, 5, 8) and Ken Nelson (track 7). The fourth song on the set, "More Heat Than Light", gives credits to Finn's father Barry Andrews as co-author. According to the booklet notes the last song of the set, "The Nowhere Man", is taken from the 1954 novel by C.S. Lewis "The Horse and His Boy". The song "Vicious Traditions" was featured during the end credits of the 2007 film Mr. Brooks.

== Track list ==
All songs written by Finn Andrews, except where noted.

- CD/LP (RTRADECD135/RTRADELP135)
1. "The Wild Son" – 3:00
2. "Guiding Light" – 2:50
3. "Lavinia" – 5:31
4. "More Heat Than Light" – 4:06 (Andrews/Andrews/Marsh)
5. "The Tide That Left and Never Came Back" – 3:08
6. "The Leavers Dance" – 4:06
7. "Talk Down the Girl" – 4:10
8. "The Valleys of New Orleans" – 4:29
9. "Vicious Traditions" – 4:50
10. "The Nowhere Man" – 3:53
- Japanese edition CD (TOCP-66291)
1. "The Wild Son" – 3:00
2. "Guiding Light" – 2:50
3. "Lavinia" – 5:31
4. "More Heat Than Light" – 4:06 (Andrews/Andrews/Marsh)
5. "The Tide That Left and Never Came Back" – 3:08
6. "The Leavers Dance" – 4:06
7. "Talk Down the Girl" – 4:10
8. "The Valleys of New Orleans" – 4:29
9. "Vicious Traditions" – 4:50
10. "The Nowhere Man" – 3:53
11. "... & One of Us Must Go" – 3:44 [Bonus track]
12. "Wires to Flying Birds" – 3:41 [Bonus track]
- Promotional CD (RTRADEPR135)
1. "The Leavers Dance" – 4:05
2. "The Tide That Left and Never Came Back" – 3:07
3. "Lavinia" – 5:31
4. "More Heat Than Light" – 4:04 (Andrews/Andrews/Marsh)
5. "Talk Down the Girl" – 4:08
6. "Guiding Light" – 2:49
7. "The Nowhere Man" – 3:48
8. "...& One of Us Must Go" – 3:44
9. "Vicious Traditions" – 4:49
10. "Wires to Flying Birds" – 3:41

== Personnel ==
- Finn Andrews – voice and guitar
- Oli Drake – guitar
- Adam Kinsella – bass guitar
- Ben Woollacott – drums
- Dina Beamish – cello, strings arrangement
- Claire Orsler – viola
- Anne Stevenson – violin
- Gina Ball – violin
- Brian Wright – violin
- Jackie Norrie – violin
- Sally Herbert – strings arrangement on "The Wild Son"
- Ellie Gray – backing vocals
- Iron John – handclaps
