= Care (Shriekback album) =

Studio album by Shriekback
- Released: 1983
- Studio: KPM Studios, Denmark Street, London; some overdubs at Berry Street, London
- Genre: New wave
- Label: Y Records; Warner Bros.
- Producer: Shriekback, Ian Caple

Shriekback chronology
| Tench (1982) | Care (1983) | Jam Science (1984) |

Singles from Care
- 1. "Lined Up" Released: 1983; 2. "Lined Up (Remix)" Released: 1983

Professional ratings
Review scores
| Source | Rating |
|---|---|
| AllMusic | 4/5 stars |
| The Encyclopedia of Popular Music | 4/5 stars |
| MusicHound Rock: The Essential Album Guide | 3/5 stars |

Care is the first full-length Shriekback album (and their second studio album after Tench), released in 1983.

The single "Lined Up" was a minor club hit and reached number 39 on the Australian ARIA charts. "Lined Up" was released twice in the UK (the second time as a remix), peaking at number 89 initially and number 78 for the remix. The album spent 3 weeks on the Billboard album chart, peaking at number 188.

== Critical reception ==
Trouser Press called the album "an intelligent, well-produced, spirited debut, demonstrating what every XTC fan knew all along — [Barry] Andrews is one of rock’s most original and musical keyboard players."

== Track listing ==
All tracks written and composed by Dave Allen, Barry Andrews, Carl Marsh, except where noted.

=== UK version ===
1. "Lined Up" (Andrews) – 3:48
2. "Clear Trails" – 3:41
3. "Hapax Legomena" - 3:58
4. "Petulant" – 3:53
5. "Lines from the Library" – 3:38
6. "Brink of Collapse" – 4:08
7. "Sway" – 3:58
8. "Into Method" (Allen, Andrews, Caple, Marsh ) – 4:27
9. "Evaporation" (Andrews, Marsh) – 3:21
10. "In: Amongst" - 2:12

=== US version ===
1. "Lined Up" – 3:50
2. "Clear Trails" – 3:45
3. "Accretions" – 4:12
4. "My Spine (Is the Bassline)" – 4:01
5. "Into Method" (Allen, Andrews, Caple, Marsh) – 4:26
6. "Brink of Collapse" – 4:05
7. "Petulant" – 3:58
8. "Sway" – 3:55
9. "Lines from the Library" – 3:42
10. "Evaporation" – 3:20

=== Remastered edition, released by the band in 2014 in extremely limited quantities ===
1. "Lined Up"
2. "Clear Trails"
3. "Hapax Legomena"
4. "Petulant"
5. "Lines from the Library"
6. "Brink of Collapse"
7. "Sway"
8. "Into Method"
9. "Evaporation"
10. "In: Amongst"
11. "My Spine (Is the Bassline)"
12. "Speed of Clocks"
13. "Despite Dense Weed"
14. "Gated Joy"
15. "Working on the Ground"
16. "Tiny Birds"
17. "Feelers"
18. "Lined Up (Disco Mix)"

== Personnel ==
Shriekback

- Barry Andrews - keyboards, synthesizers, vocals
- Carl Marsh - guitars, vocals
- Dave Allen - bass

with:

- Kirsty MacColl - backing vocals on "Lined Up"

Technical

- Ian Caple - engineer, co-production
