= Barry Andrews (musician) =

English singer, songwriter, and keyboardist

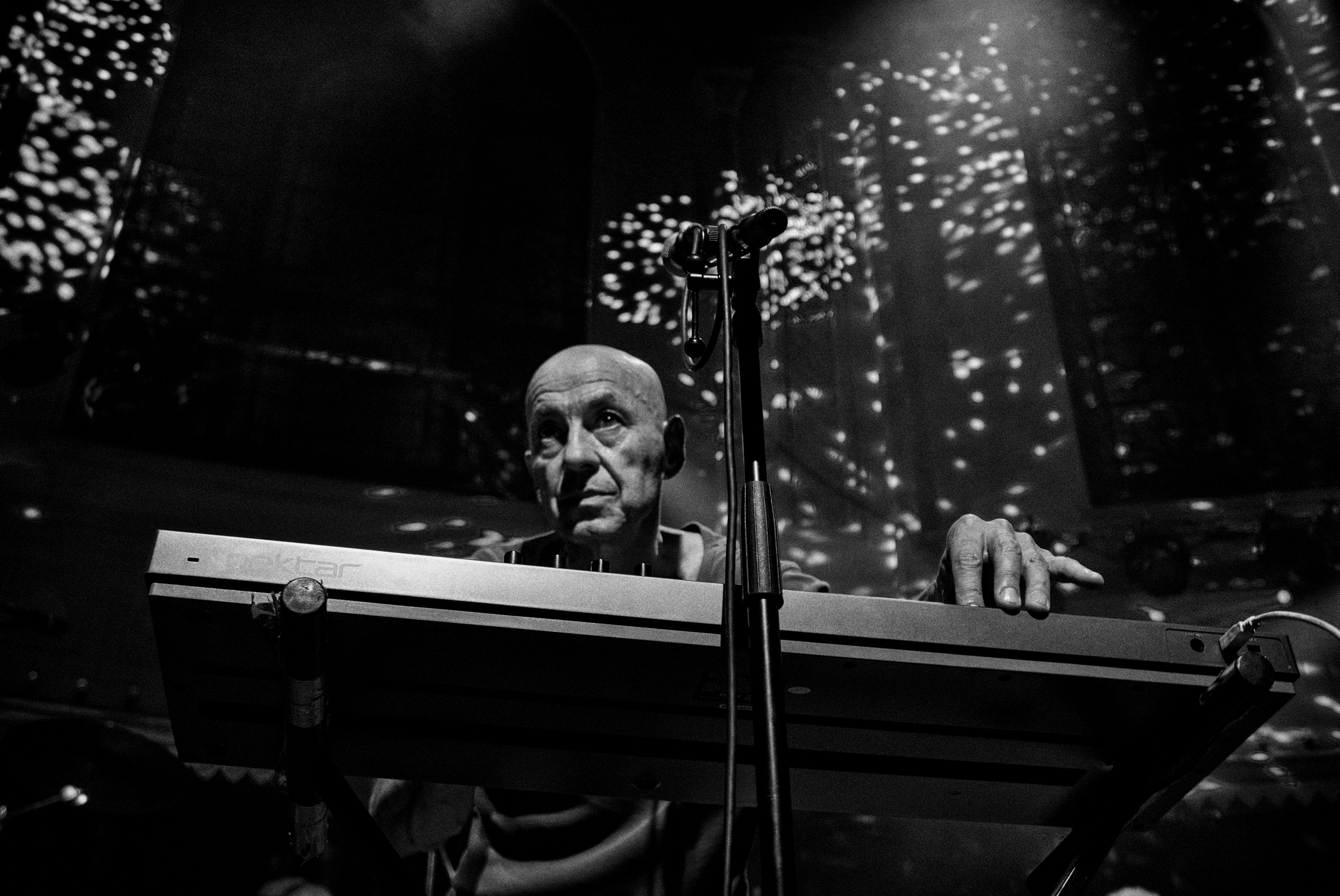
- Andrews performing with Shriekback in 2017

Background information
- Born: 12 September 1956 (age 70)
- Origin: West Norwood, London, England
- Genres: Funk rock; new wave; art rock; experimental rock
- Occupations: Songwriter; singer; musician
- Instruments: Vocals; keyboards; guitar
- Years active: 1976–present
- Labels: Virgin; Y Records; Arista, Island; World Domination; Malicious Damage
- Member of: Shriekback
- Formerly of: XTC; The League of Gentlemen

Barry Andrews (born 12 September 1956) is an English songwriter, singer and keyboard player who is frontman of the English rock band Shriekback. Before forming the band with Dave Allen in 1981, Andrews was a member of XTC (1976–78) and the League of Gentlemen, a band led by Robert Fripp in 1980.

== Early life ==
Barry William Andrews was born in West Norwood, London, on 12 September, 1956, the only child of bricklayer William Andrews and Minnie, a housewife. Andrews attended Hitherfield Primary School in South-East London before moving with his family to Park North, Swindon, at the age of seven. He attended Park North Junior School, Richard Jefferies Secondary School and Park Senior High School, leaving full-time education in 1976.

== Career ==
On leaving school, Andrews played keyboards in covers bands in Swindon and Exeter before joining XTC in 1978. He played on the band’s first two albums, White Music and Go 2, before leaving in 1979. That same year, he recorded the solo EP Town and Country (Virgin) and played on Iggy Pop’s Soldier (Arista) with David Bowie, Ivan Král, Glen Matlock, Klaus Krüger and Steve New.

In 1980 he recorded the single Rossmore Road/Win a Night Out with a Well-Known Paranoiac on Virgin. Also in 1980, Andrews joined Robert Fripp's The League of Gentlemen with Sara Lee and Jonny TooBad. They recorded one album for E.G. Records before Fripp dismissed the band. Andrews then formed Restaurant for Dogs with Kevin Wilkinson, Dave Marx and Bruce McRae. Latterly Clare Hirst, Sara Lee and Carlo Asciutti joined the band.

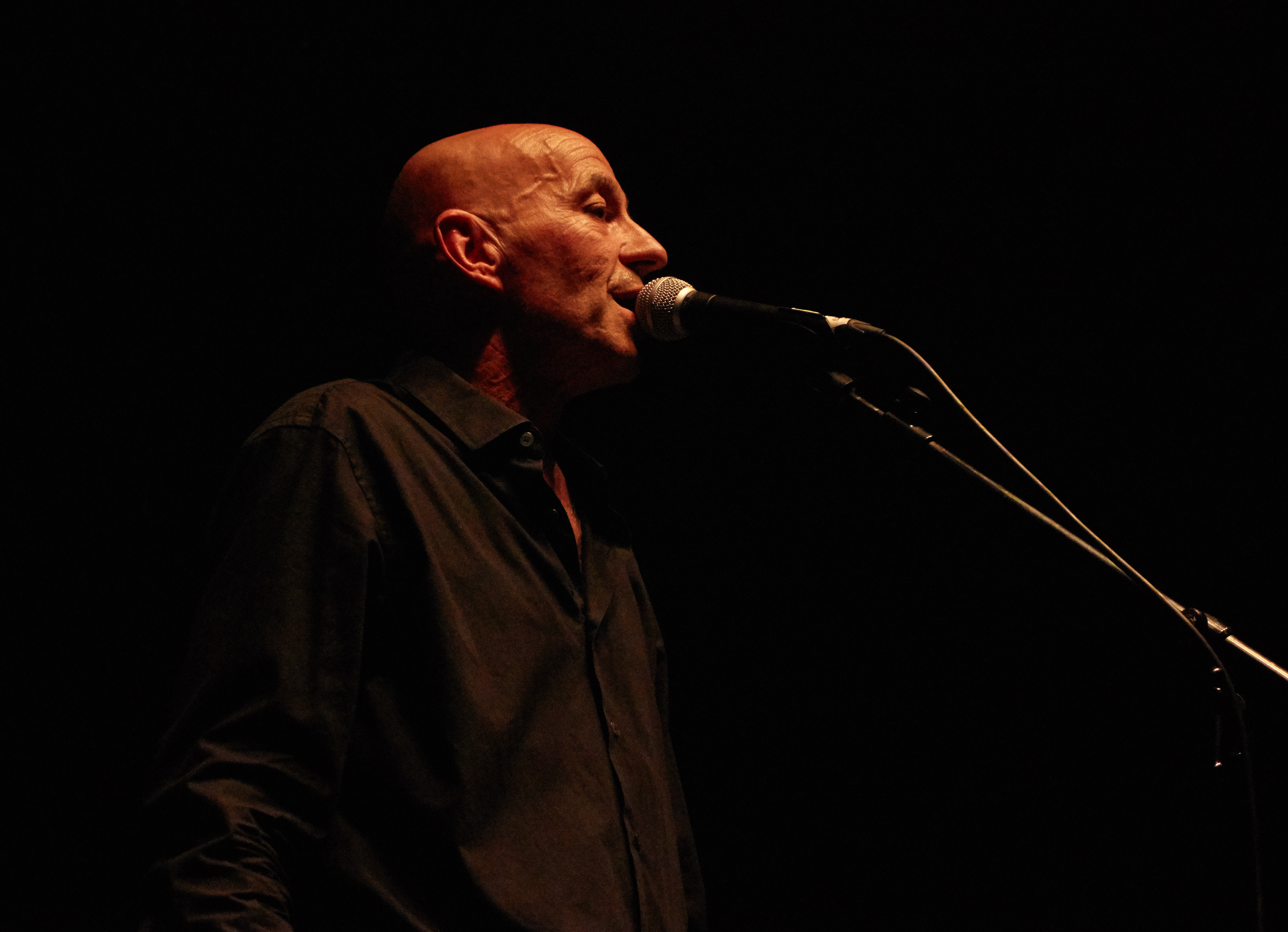
Barry Andrews performing live with Shriekback

In 1981, Andrews met up with bassist Dave Allen who had recently left Gang of Four and the pair, along with guitarist/vocalist Carl Marsh, formed Shriekback. Shriekback have been active for 45 years, recording 18 studio albums.

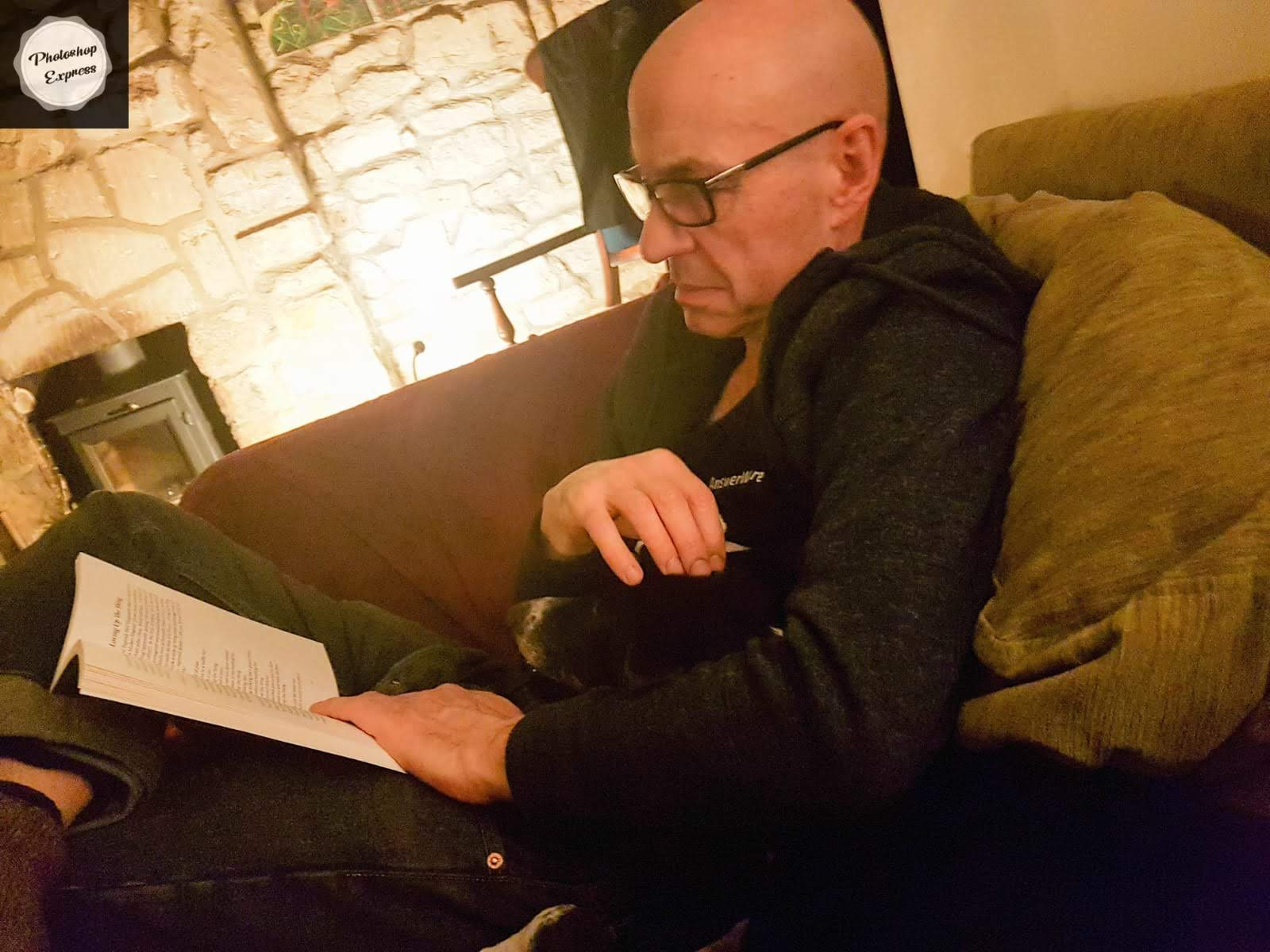
Barry at home with his dog, Wolsey

In 2003, Andrews began releasing solo projects through his own Shriekprods label. These form two main strands: the Haunted Box of Switches series of piano and voice albums which feature original material alongside minimalist reimaginings of Shriekback songs; and the Stic Basin series of albums of experimental electronica, of which there are now three volumes.

In 2005, Andrews played keyboards on Brian Eno’s album Another Day on Earth. 2007 saw Andrews reunite with former XTC bandmate Andy Partridge alongside Shriekback drummer Martyn Barker on Monstrance, a double album of instrumental improvisations. In 2015, Andrews recorded a six-track EP called Juju Grid with Mike Tournier from Fluke, under the name of Anaxaton6. Contaminated Pop in 2019 was Andrews’ first solo album released under his own name.

During a six-year break from music from 1996 to 2001, Andrews began to design furniture and sculpture and studied for a degree in 3D Design in Metals at Camberwell and Middlesex universities. He also ran The Hoxton Gift Shop with Régine de la Hey in 2001, a gallery which sold original artworks.

== Personal life ==
Andrews lives in London and Stroud, Gloucestershire. He has a son, Finn Andrews, the lead singer/songwriter of The Veils, from his marriage to Vivienne Kent in the early 1980s.

== Discography ==
XTC

- 3D EP (EP, 1977)
- White Music (album, 1977)
- Go 2 (album, 1978)

Shriekback

- Tench (EP, 1982)
- Care (album, 1983)
- Jam Science (album, 1984)
- Oil and Gold (album, 1985)
- Big Night Music (album, 1986)
- Go Bang! (album, 1988)
- Sacred City (album, 1992)
- Naked Apes and Pond Life (album, 2000)
- Having a Moment (album, 2003)
- Cormorant (album, 2005)
- Glory Bumps (album, 2007)
- Life in the Loading Bay (album, 2010)
- Without Real String or Fish (album, 2015)
- Why Anything? Why This? (album, 2018)
- Some Kinds of Light (album, 2019)
- 1000 Books (album, 2021)
- Bowlahoola (album, 2022)
- Monument (album, 2025)

Solo

- Town and Country (EP, 1979)
- Rossmore Road (single, 1980)
- Stic Basin 1 (album, 2003)
- Haunted Box of Switches 1 (album, 2003)
- Contaminated Pop (album, 2019)
- Haunted Box of Switches vols 1&2 (album, 2019)
- Stic Basin 2 (album, 2020)
- Stic Basin 3 (album, 2022)

Collaborations/Guest Keyboards

- Robert Fripp: Exposure (album, 1979)
- Iggy Pop: Soldier (album, 1980)
- Robert Fripp: League of Gentlemen (album, 1981)
- Restaurant for Dogs: Live at the 101 Club (album, 1981)
- Brian Eno: Another Day on Earth (album, 2005)
- Monstrance (album, 2007)
- Anaxaton6: JuJu Grid (EP, 2013)
