= Tench (EP) =

EP by Shriekback
- Released: 1982
- Recorded: K.P.M. Studios by Ian Caple, Berry St. Studios by Brad Grisdale
- Genre: Post-punk
- Length: 25:12
- Label: Y, Virgin
- Producer: David Allen, Barry Andrews, Carl Marsh, Linda Neville, Ian Caple

Shriekback chronology
Tench (1982)	Care (1983)

Professional ratings
Review scores
Source	Rating
AllMusic	3/5 stars

Tench is the debut EP by Shriekback, released in 1982. It spawned one single: "Sexthinkone".

== Track listing ==
1. "Accretions"
2. "Moth Loop"
3. "Here Comes My Hand-Clap"
4. "Sexthinkone"
5. "A Kind of Fascination"
6. "All the Greek Boys (Do the Handwalk)"

This album was released on vinyl only. On some releases, the first three tracks listed here appear on Side A of the record whereas, on others, they appear on Side B.

== 2015 remastered edition ==
CD 1

1. "Sexthinkone" (3:39)
2. "A Kind of Fascination" (4:34)
3. "All the Greek Boys (Do the Handwalk)" (4:13)
4. "Accretions" (4:28)
5. "Mothloop" (4:39)
6. "Here Comes My Hand:Clap" (3:17)
7. "Mount Pleasant Thrash" (2:42)
8. "So Hard So Hard" (3:05)
9. "Something Else" (featuring Danny Crilly) (3:05)
10. "Who's on Top" (featuring Emma Burnham) (2:48)
11. "Bricks and Whistles" (2:28)
12. "Floral Police Van" (3:41)
13. "Plunging into Homes" (2:46)
14. "Regret No Dogs" (3:05)
15. "Feelers" (Remix) (4:56)
16. "Accretions" (Remix) (4:29)

CD 2

1. "Sexthinkone" (Live in Detroit '83) (6:13)
2. "Sway" (Live in Detroit '83) (6:29)
3. "Brink of Collapse" (Live in Detroit '83) (5:02)
4. "Grapes into Lettuce" (Live in Detroit '83) (4:31)
5. "Considerable" (Live in Detroit '83) (4:43)
6. "Mothloop" (Live in Detroit '83) (3:57)
7. "A Kind of Fascination" (Live in Detroit '83) (4:45)
8. "Despite Dense Weed" (Live in Detroit '83) (7:14)
9. "My Spine (Is the Bassline)" (Live in Detroit '83) (5:04)
10. "Lined Up" (Live in Detroit '83) (6:24)

== Personnel ==
Shriekback

- Barry Andrews - keyboards, synthesizers, vocals
- Carl Marsh - guitars, vocals
- Dave Allen - bass

Technical

- Ian Caple - engineer, co-production
