= Nux Vomica =

Studio album by The Veils
- Released: 18 September 2006
- Recorded: Seedy Underbelly Studios, Laurel Canyon, California and Everest Street, Devonport, Auckland, New Zealand in spring 2006
- Genre: Gothic rock, indie rock, pop
- Length: 43:32
- Label: Rough Trade
- Producer: Nick Launay

The Veils chronology
The Runaway Found (2004)	Nux Vomica (2006)	Sun Gangs (2009)

Professional ratings
Review scores
Source	Rating
AllMusic	link
The Guardian	4/5 stars
Pitchfork	7.6/10

Nux Vomica is the second album by the Veils, released on 18 September 2006. It was recorded in Laurel Canyon (Los Angeles) and produced by Nick Launay, during spring of 2006. A far heavier and darker sound characterises Nux Vomica, very different from the indie sound of the previous record. Most notable are "Jesus for the Jugular", "Not Yet", "Pan" and the title track itself, while more accessible numbers are the singles "Advice for Young Mothers to Be" and "One Night on Earth". A distinctive contribution to this new sound was given by the string arrangements of Jane Scarpantoni, ex member of The Lounge Lizards and long-time Lou Reed collaborator.

== Track list ==
All songs written by Finn Andrews, except where noted.

- CD/LP (RTRADCD235/RTRADLP235)
1. "Not Yet" – 4:54
2. "Calliope!" – 3:35 (Andrews/Gerrard)
3. "Advice for Young Mothers to Be" – 3:25
4. "Jesus for the Jugular" – 4:46
5. "Pan" – 4:58
6. "A Birthday Present" – 3:43
7. "Under the Folding Branches" – 3:23
8. "Nux Vomica" – 5:30
9. "One Night on Earth" – 4:08
10. "House Where We All Live" – 5:06
- Enhanced CD (RTD002)
1. "Not Yet" – 4:54
2. "Calliope!" – 3:35 (Andrews/Gerrard)
3. "Advice for Young Mothers to Be" – 3:25
4. "Jesus for the Jugular" – 4:46
5. "Pan" – 4:58
6. "A Birthday Present" – 3:43
7. "Under the Folding Branches" – 3:23
8. "Nux Vomica" – 5:30
9. "One Night on Earth" – 4:08
10. "House Where We All Live" – 5:06
11. "Night Thoughts of a Tired Surgeon" – 2:51
12. "Advice for Young Mothers to Be" (Video)
- Japan Edition (POCE-15001/4988005453860)
1. "Not Yet" – 4:54
2. "Calliope!" – 3:35 (Andrews/Gerrard)
3. "Advice for Young Mothers to Be" – 3:25
4. "Night Thoughts of a Tired Surgeon" – 2:51
5. "Jesus for the Jugular" – 4:46
6. "Pan" – 4:58
7. "A Birthday Present" – 3:43
8. "Under the Folding Branches" – 3:23
9. "Nux Vomica" – 5:30
10. "One Night on Earth" – 4:08
11. "House Where We All Live" – 5:06

== Personnel ==
- Finn Andrews – vocals, guitar
- Sophia Burn – bass
- Liam Gerrard – piano, organ, harmonium
- Henning Dietz – drums, percussion
- Dan Raishbrook – guitar
- Eric Gorfain – violin
- Jane Scarpantoni – cello
- Janubia and Natalie Wilde – backing vocals
