= Total Depravity =

Studio album by The Veils
- Released: 26 August 2016
- Studio: Estúdios Sá da Bandeira, Porto; Konk Studios, London; Pantherkill, New York
- Genre: Alternative rock; blues; gothic rock; post-punk; soul; Southern Gothic
- Length: 48:00
- Label: Nettwerk Productions
- Producer: El-P; Adam "Atom" Greenspan; Dean Hurley

The Veils chronology
Time Stays, We Go (2013)	Total Depravity (2016)	...And Out of the Void Came Love (2023)

Professional ratings
Aggregate scores
Source	Rating
Metacritic	69/100
Review scores
Source	Rating
AllMusic	3.5/5 stars
The Skinny	4/5 stars

Total Depravity is the fifth studio album by London-based band the Veils. It was released by Nettwerk Productions on 26 August 2016.

== Track listing ==
No.	Title	Length
1.	"Axolotl"	3:03
2.	"A Bit on the Side"	3:55
3.	"Low Lays the Devil"	3:17
4.	"King of Chrome"	4:05
5.	"Swimming with the Crocodiles"	4:33
6.	"Here Come the Dead"	3:15
7.	"In the Blood"	3:22
8.	"Iodine & Iron"	4:36
9.	"House of Spirits"	4:15
10.	"Do Your Bones Glow at Night?"	4:34
11.	"In the Nightfall"	4:06
12.	"Total Depravity"	5:04

== Charts ==
Chart (2016)	Peak position
Belgian Albums (Ultratop Flanders)	27
Belgian Albums (Ultratop Wallonia)	19
Dutch Albums (Album Top 100)	7
New Zealand Albums (RMNZ)	4
