= Time Stays, We Go =

Studio album by the Veils
- Released: 26 April 2013
- Recorded: 2012
- Studio: Seedy Underbelly Studios, Los Angeles
- Genre: Post-punk, Southern Gothic
- Length: 40:05
- Label: Pitch Beast Records
- Producer: Finn Andrews, Adam Greenspan

The Veils chronology
Sun Gangs (2009)	Time Stays, We Go (2013)	Total Depravity (2016)

Professional ratings
Aggregate scores
Source	Rating
Metacritic	61/100
Review scores
Source	Rating
AllMusic	3.5/5 stars
PopMatters	9/10 stars

Time Stays, We Go is the fourth studio album by London-based band the Veils. It was released by Pitch Beast Records on 26 April 2013.

== Track listing ==
All tracks are written by Finn Andrews.

No.	Title	Length
1.	"Through the Deep, Dark Wood"	3:06
2.	"Train with No Name"	4:37
3.	"Candy Apple Red"	4:09
4.	"Dancing with the Tornado"	3:44
5.	"The Pearl"	3:56
6.	"Sign of Your Love"	4:28
7.	"Turn from the Rain"	3:33
8.	"Birds"	4:29
9.	"Another Night on Earth"	3:54
10.	"Out from the Valley & Into the Stars"	4:24

Limited edition bonus disc
No.	Title	Length
1.	"Out from the Valley & Into the Stars"	4:39
2.	"Turn from the Rain"	4:19
3.	"Birds"	4:29
4.	"The Pearl"	4:12
5.	"Summer and Smoke"	2:04

== Personnel ==
Credits adapted from liner notes.

- Finn Andrews – vocals, guitar, piano
- Sophia Burn – bass guitar
- Henning Dietz – drums
- Dan Raishbrook – guitar
- Uberto Rapisardi – guitar (8)
- Chelsea Jade – backing vocals (8, 9)
- Matt Appleton – trumpet
- Tony Beliveau – hammond organ
- Iron John – handclaps

== Charts ==
Chart (2013)	Peak position
Dutch Albums (Album Top 100)	63
New Zealand Albums (RMNZ)	21
