= Big Night Music =

Studio album by Shriekback
- Released: 1986
- Recorded: 1 May – 23 July 1986
- Studios: The Point, London; The Fallout Shelter, London
- Genre: Pop
- Label: Island
- Producer: Gavin MacKillop

Shriekback chronology
Oil & Gold (1985)	Big Night Music (1986)	Go Bang! (1988)

Singles from Big Night Music
- 1. "Gunning for the Buddha" Released: 1986; 2. "Running on the Rocks" Released: 1986

Big Night Music is a studio album by the English band Shriekback, released in 1986. It spent six weeks on the Billboard album chart, peaking at number 145. With the departure of Carl Marsh, Barry Andrews took over as the band's frontman. Remaining original member Dave Allen left the band following the release of the album.

== Track listing ==
All songs by Dave Allen, Barry Andrews and Martyn Barker.

1. "Black Light Trap" - 5:09
2. "Gunning for the Buddha" - 4:37
3. "Running on the Rocks" - 4:58
4. "The Shining Path" - 4:37
5. "Pretty Little Things" - 3:50
6. "Underwaterboys" - 4:51
7. "Exquisite" - 4:30
8. "The Reptiles and I" - 4:32
9. "Sticky Jazz" - 4:28
10. "Cradle Song" - 4:16

== Charts ==
Chart (1986)	Peak position
Australia (Kent Music Report)	68
Canada Top Albums/CDs (RPM)	89

== Personnel ==
- Barry Andrews - keyboards, synthesizers, lead vocals
- Dave Allen - bass
- Martyn Barker - drums
- Sarah Partridge - backing vocals (tracks 1, 3 to 7 and 9)
- Wendy Partridge - backing vocals (tracks 1, 3 to 7 and 9)
- Steve Halliwell - keyboards, Hammond organ and electric piano (tracks 1, 4 to 6, 9 and 10)
- Mike Cozzi - electric and acoustic guitar (tracks 1 to 4 and 6 to 10)
- Mark Chandler - trumpet (tracks 1 and 3)
- Ian Fraser - tenor saxophone (tracks 1 and 3)
- Richard Edwards - trombone (tracks 1 and 3)
