= Sun Gangs =

Studio album by the Veils
- Released: 6 April 2009
- Recorded: West Point and West Heath studios, London 2008
- Length: 41:05
- Label: Rough Trade
- Producer: Graham Sutton, Bernard Butler

The Veils chronology
Nux Vomica (2006)	Sun Gangs (2009)	Time Stays, We Go (2013)

Professional ratings
Review scores
Source	Rating
A Distorted Reality	4/5 stars
Dusted	4/5 stars
InYourSpeakers	(Positive)
UNCUT	4/5 stars

Sun Gangs is the third album by the Veils, released on 6 April 2009 in both CD and LP formats. Finn Andrews has described it as "a very modern mixture of prayers, love letters and personal record keeping". Sun Gangs was produced by Graham Sutton, with the exception of the opening track "Sit Down by the Fire", produced by Bernard Butler. No official singles were released to promote the album though 1-track promos of "Three Sisters" and "The Letter" were sent out to radio stations in late February, 2009.

== Track list ==
All songs written by Finn Andrews.

- CD/LP (RTRADCD382/RTRADLP382)
1. "Sit Down by the Fire" – 3:51
2. "Sun Gangs" – 3:43
3. "The Letter" – 3:31
4. "Killed by the Boom" – 2:49
5. "It Hits Deep" – 5:27
6. "Three Sisters" – 2:32
7. "The House She Lived In" – 3:48
8. "Scarecrow" – 3:31
9. "Larkspur" – 8:33
10. "Begin Again" – 3:15

== Personnel ==
- Finn Andrews – vocals, guitar, piano
- Sophia Burn – bass
- Henning Dietz – drums, percussion
- Dan Raishbrook – guitar, screeches, drone
- Basia Bulat – backing vocals on "Scarecrow" and "The House She Lived in"
- Edward Harcourt – hammond on "Three Sisters", "It Hits Deep" and "Killed by the Boom"
- Catherine A.D. – backing vocals on "Sit Down by the Fire"
- James Duncan – scattered ohms
- Dina Beamish – cello
- Kristen Kilingel – viola
- Brian Wright – violin
- Margot Chassagne – violin
