= Shriekback =

English rock band

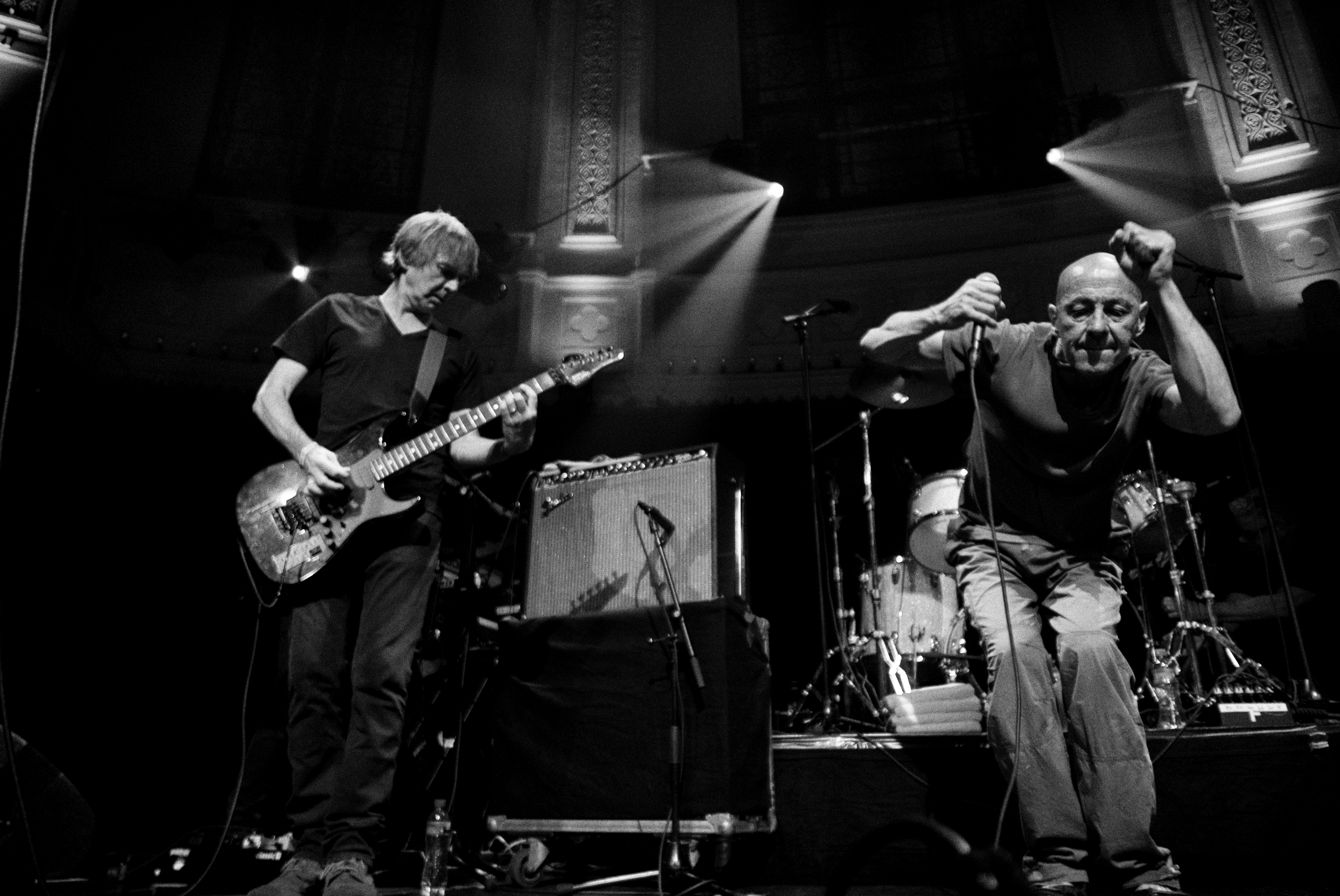
- Shriekback performing in 2017

Background information
- Origin: Kentish Town, London, England
- Genres: Post-punk; new wave
- Years active: 1981–1989; 1992; 1999–present
- Labels: Y; Arista; Island; Capitol
- Members: Barry Andrews; Carl Marsh; Martyn Barker
- Past members: Dave Allen; Mike Cozzi; Wendy Partridge; Sarah Partridge; Lu Edmonds; Mark Raudva; Kevin 'Doc' Sullivan
- Website: shriekback.com

Shriekback are an English rock band formed in 1981 in Kentish Town by Barry Andrews, formerly of XTC and the League of Gentlemen (keyboards/synthesizers/vocals), and Dave Allen, formerly of Gang of Four (bass guitar), with Carl Marsh, formerly of Out on Blue Six (guitars/vocals) soon added to the line-up. The band's early music was a funk-influenced version of new wave and post-punk, later moving towards art rock and always featuring "insidiously weird vocals".

== History ==
The band enjoyed some success on the dance chart on its original Y Records label and had a string of hits on the UK Indie Chart, while its first album, Care (1983), was picked up by Warner in the United States. The band left Y for Arista Records for Jam Science (1984), also recruiting the drummer Martyn Barker. The album reached number 85 on the UK Albums Chart and "Hand on my Heart" was a number 52 UK single. The 1985 album Oil and Gold was recorded on Arista (released by Island Records in the US). Marsh left Shriekback during the recording of Oil and Gold and was replaced on guitar by Mike Cozzi, with Andrews taking over lead vocals. Shriekback also left Arista and signed to Island Records for whom they recorded Big Night Music (1986), after which Allen left to rejoin Gang of Four, and Shriekback remained a collaborative centred on Andrews. Allen also went on to play in King Swamp and The Elastic Purejoy. Marsh was also in the band Happyhead.

After another album in 1988, Go Bang!, the band split up. Andrews continued working on other projects before re-forming Shriekback in 1992, although after the single "The Bastard Sons of Enoch" and album Sacred City, there were no further releases until Naked Apes and Pond Life (2000). Both Allen and Marsh returned to the studio to contribute to the recording of the 2003 release Having a Moment. After Having a Moment, Andrews recorded three albums for Malicious Damage (Killing Joke's original label) under the Shriekback name.

Shriekback are still actively producing music and released the studio album, Why Anything? Why This?, in May 2018. The same line-up of Andrews, Barker and Marsh self-released a 15th studio album, Some Kinds of Light, on 6 December 2019. 1000 Books, Bowlahoola, and MONUMENT followed in 2021, 2022, and 2025 respectively.

== Members ==
Other than those listed above, Shriekback members or contributors have included Luc van Acker, Linda Nevill, Emma Burnham, Brian Nevill, Pedro Ortiz, Clare Hirst, Lu Edmonds, Wendy and Sarah Partridge (from Electric Guitars), Steve Halliwell, Eve Moon, Ivan Julian, Mike Cozzi and Jessica Palin/Jose Fina Cupido.

== In other media ==
Several Shriekback songs appear in producer Michael Mann's television series Miami Vice and his film Manhunter. They are also featured in Vice director Paul Michael Glaser's film Band of the Hand. Music composed by Shriekback is used as the theme song for the Squaring the Strange podcast hosted by Benjamin Radford and Pascual Romero. They selected it because of their fondness for music from the 1980s.

== Discography ==
=== Studio albums ===
- Tench (1982)
- Care (1983), Y (UK Indie No. 7)
- Jam Science (1984), Arista (UK No. 85)
- Oil and Gold (1985), Arista
- Big Night Music (1986), Island
- Go Bang! (1988), Island
- Sacred City (1992), World Domination/Capitol
- Naked Apes and Pond Life (2000), Mauve/Mushroom
- Having a Moment (2003)
- Cormorant (2005)
- Glory Bumps (2007)
- Life in the Loading Bay (December 2010)
- Without Real String or Fish (March 2015)
- Why Anything? Why This? (May 2018)
- Some Kinds of Light (December 2019)
- 1000 Books (December 2021)
- Bowlahoola (November 2022)
- MONUMENT (March 2025)

=== Compilations and live albums ===
- The Infinite (The Best of Shriekback) (1984), Kaz
- Evolution – Best of Shriekback Vol. 2 (1988), Kaz
- The Dancing Years (1990), Island
- Natural History – The Very Best of Shriekback (1994), Essential
- Priests and Kannibals: The Best of Shriekback (1994), Arista
- The Y Records Years (2000), Sanctuary
- Aberrations 81–84 (2001), Weatherbox
- Vicissitudes (2002) (Shriekback.com Internet-only release)
- 2 Live Shows (2002)
- Live at Hatfield (2002)
- Secrets of the City (2002) (Shriekback.com Internet-only release)
- Island of the Hopeful Monsters (2015)
- Live at Park West, Chicago '87 (2016)
- Peel Sessions and Singularities (2016)
- Big Live Band 2017 (2017)
- The Elated World (2017) (album of commissioned songs)

=== Singles and EPs ===
Year	Title	Chart positions						Album
Year	Title	UK Indie Chart	UK Singles Chart	U.S. Dance/Club	U.S. Modern Rock	AUS	New Zealand	Album
1982	Tench	9	-	-	-	-	-	
1982	"Sexthinkone"	-	-	-	-	-	-	Tench (EP)
1982	"My Spine Is the Bassline"	15	-	-	-	-	-	-
1983	"Lined Up"	3	89	35	-	42	-	Care
1983	"Lined Up (Remix)"	7	113	-	-	-	-	Care
1983	"Working on the Ground"	5	107	-	-	-	-	-
1984	"Hand on My Heart"	-	52	22	-	-	-	Jam Science
1984	"Mercy Dash"	-	107	-	-	-	-	Jam Science
1984	Knowledge, Power, Truth and Sex EP	-	-	-	-	-	-	Jam Science
1985	"Nemesis"	-	94	-	-	-	18	Oil and Gold
1985	"Fish Below the Ice"	-	88	-	-	-	-	Oil and Gold
1986	"Gunning for the Buddha"	-	-	-	-	-	-	Big Night Music
1986	Running on the Rocks	-	-	-	-	-	30	Big Night Music
1988	"Intoxication"	-	-	-	6	-	-	Go Bang!
1988	"Shark Walk"	-	-	-	19	-	-	Go Bang!
1988	"Get Down Tonight"	-	132	20	-	-	19	Go Bang!
1988	The Peel Sessions EP	-	-	-	-	-	-	-
1992	"The Bastard Sons of Enoch"	-	-	-	-	-	-	Sacred City

=== Video albums ===
- Jungle of the Senses (1987) Island Visual Arts
