= Martyn Barker =

British musician (born 1959)

Martyn Barker (born 14 September 1959) is an English drummer, percussionist, composer and producer, best known as the drummer for Shriekback. He has also been a member of King Swamp.

Barker was born in Ellesmere Port, Merseyside.

He has worked and performed with Robert Plant, Ray Davies, Mick Ronson, Goldfrapp, Marianne Faithfull, Sarah Jane Morris, Billy Bragg, Beth Gibbons, Rustin Man, Alain Bashung, Juliette Gréco, and Justin Adams. He co-wrote 14 Shriekback albums as well as many songs on the Billy Bragg and the Blokes album England, Half-English and has produced and drummed for acts worldwide. He has recently been performing music with the Royal Shakespeare Company on productions of As You Like It and A Midsummer Night's Dream.

The track "Sacred Waters", which was taken from Barker's collaborative album with Emily Burridge, was used as incidental music on Critical Role for the first episode of season 3.

== Discography ==
- Water & Stone, 2020 (with Emily Burridge)
