= Table of divisors =

Plot of the number of divisors of integers from 1 to 1000. Highly composite numbers are labelled in bold and superior highly composite numbers are starred. In the SVG file, hover over a bar to see its statistics.

The tables below list all of the divisors of the numbers 1 to 1000.

A divisor of an integer n is an integer m, for which n/m is again an integer (which is necessarily also a divisor of n). For example, 3 is a divisor of 21, since 21/7 = 3 (and therefore 7 is also a divisor of 21).

If m is a divisor of n, then so is −m. The tables below only list positive divisors.

0 is excluded, given that since every number a can divide into it for a result of 0, it technically has infinitely many divisors.

== Key to the tables ==
- d(n) is the number of the positive divisors of n, including 1 and n itself
- σ(n) is the sum of the positive divisors of n, including 1 and n itself
- s(n) is the sum of the proper divisors of n, including 1 but not n itself; that is, s(n) = σ(n) − n
- a deficient number is greater than the sum of its proper divisors; that is, s(n) < n
- a perfect number equals the sum of its proper divisors; that is, s(n) = n
- an abundant number is lesser than the sum of its proper divisors; that is, s(n) > n
- a highly abundant number has a sum of positive divisors that is greater than any lesser number; that is, σ(n) > σ(m) for every positive integer m < n. Counterintuitively, the first seven highly abundant numbers (as well as the ninth) are not abundant numbers.
- a prime number has only 1 and itself as divisors; that is, d(n) = 2
- a composite number has more than just 1 and itself as divisors; that is, d(n) > 2
- a highly composite number has a number of positive divisors that is greater than any lesser number; that is, d(n) > d(m) for every positive integer m < n. Counterintuitively, the first two highly composite numbers are not composite numbers.
- a superior highly composite number has a ratio between its number of divisors and itself raised to some positive power that equals or is greater than the ratio of any other number; that is, there exists some ε such that $\frac{d(n)}{n^\varepsilon}\geq\frac{d(m)}{m^\varepsilon}$ for every other positive integer m
- a primitive abundant number is an abundant number whose proper divisors are all deficient numbers
- a weird number is a number that is abundant but not semiperfect; that is, no subset of the proper divisors of n sum to n

== 1 to 100 ==
| n | Divisors | d(n) | σ(n) | s(n) | Notes |
|---|---|---|---|---|---|
| 1 | 1 | 1 | 1 | 0 | deficient, highly abundant, highly composite |
| 2 | 1, 2 | 2 | 3 | 1 | deficient, highly abundant, prime, highly composite, superior highly composite |
| 3 | 1, 3 | 2 | 4 | 1 | deficient, highly abundant, prime |
| 4 | 1, 2, 4 | 3 | 7 | 3 | deficient, highly abundant, composite, highly composite |
| 5 | 1, 5 | 2 | 6 | 1 | deficient, prime |
| 6 | 1, 2, 3, 6 | 4 | 12 | 6 | perfect, highly abundant, composite, highly composite, superior highly composite |
| 7 | 1, 7 | 2 | 8 | 1 | deficient, prime |
| 8 | 1, 2, 4, 8 | 4 | 15 | 7 | deficient, highly abundant, composite |
| 9 | 1, 3, 9 | 3 | 13 | 4 | deficient, composite |
| 10 | 1, 2, 5, 10 | 4 | 18 | 8 | deficient, highly abundant, composite |
| 11 | 1, 11 | 2 | 12 | 1 | deficient, prime |
| 12 | 1, 2, 3, 4, 6, 12 | 6 | 28 | 16 | abundant, highly abundant, composite, highly composite, superior highly composite |
| 13 | 1, 13 | 2 | 14 | 1 | deficient, prime |
| 14 | 1, 2, 7, 14 | 4 | 24 | 10 | deficient, composite |
| 15 | 1, 3, 5, 15 | 4 | 24 | 9 | deficient, composite |
| 16 | 1, 2, 4, 8, 16 | 5 | 31 | 15 | deficient, highly abundant, composite |
| 17 | 1, 17 | 2 | 18 | 1 | deficient, prime |
| 18 | 1, 2, 3, 6, 9, 18 | 6 | 39 | 21 | abundant, highly abundant, composite |
| 19 | 1, 19 | 2 | 20 | 1 | deficient, prime |
| 20 | 1, 2, 4, 5, 10, 20 | 6 | 42 | 22 | abundant, highly abundant, composite, primitive abundant |
| n | Divisors | d(n) | σ(n) | s(n) | Notes |
| 21 | 1, 3, 7, 21 | 4 | 32 | 11 | deficient, composite |
| 22 | 1, 2, 11, 22 | 4 | 36 | 14 | deficient, composite |
| 23 | 1, 23 | 2 | 24 | 1 | deficient, prime |
| 24 | 1, 2, 3, 4, 6, 8, 12, 24 | 8 | 60 | 36 | abundant, highly abundant, composite, highly composite |
| 25 | 1, 5, 25 | 3 | 31 | 6 | deficient, composite |
| 26 | 1, 2, 13, 26 | 4 | 42 | 16 | deficient, composite |
| 27 | 1, 3, 9, 27 | 4 | 40 | 13 | deficient, composite |
| 28 | 1, 2, 4, 7, 14, 28 | 6 | 56 | 28 | perfect, composite |
| 29 | 1, 29 | 2 | 30 | 1 | deficient, prime |
| 30 | 1, 2, 3, 5, 6, 10, 15, 30 | 8 | 72 | 42 | abundant, highly abundant, composite |
| 31 | 1, 31 | 2 | 32 | 1 | deficient, prime |
| 32 | 1, 2, 4, 8, 16, 32 | 6 | 63 | 31 | deficient, composite |
| 33 | 1, 3, 11, 33 | 4 | 48 | 15 | deficient, composite |
| 34 | 1, 2, 17, 34 | 4 | 54 | 20 | deficient, composite |
| 35 | 1, 5, 7, 35 | 4 | 48 | 13 | deficient, composite |
| 36 | 1, 2, 3, 4, 6, 9, 12, 18, 36 | 9 | 91 | 55 | abundant, highly abundant, composite, highly composite |
| 37 | 1, 37 | 2 | 38 | 1 | deficient, prime |
| 38 | 1, 2, 19, 38 | 4 | 60 | 22 | deficient, composite |
| 39 | 1, 3, 13, 39 | 4 | 56 | 17 | deficient, composite |
| 40 | 1, 2, 4, 5, 8, 10, 20, 40 | 8 | 90 | 50 | abundant, composite |
| n | Divisors | d(n) | σ(n) | s(n) | Notes |
| 41 | 1, 41 | 2 | 42 | 1 | deficient, prime |
| 42 | 1, 2, 3, 6, 7, 14, 21, 42 | 8 | 96 | 54 | abundant, highly abundant, composite |
| 43 | 1, 43 | 2 | 44 | 1 | deficient, prime |
| 44 | 1, 2, 4, 11, 22, 44 | 6 | 84 | 40 | deficient, composite |
| 45 | 1, 3, 5, 9, 15, 45 | 6 | 78 | 33 | deficient, composite |
| 46 | 1, 2, 23, 46 | 4 | 72 | 26 | deficient, composite |
| 47 | 1, 47 | 2 | 48 | 1 | deficient, prime |
| 48 | 1, 2, 3, 4, 6, 8, 12, 16, 24, 48 | 10 | 124 | 76 | abundant, highly abundant, composite, highly composite |
| 49 | 1, 7, 49 | 3 | 57 | 8 | deficient, composite |
| 50 | 1, 2, 5, 10, 25, 50 | 6 | 93 | 43 | deficient, composite |
| 51 | 1, 3, 17, 51 | 4 | 72 | 21 | deficient, composite |
| 52 | 1, 2, 4, 13, 26, 52 | 6 | 98 | 46 | deficient, composite |
| 53 | 1, 53 | 2 | 54 | 1 | deficient, prime |
| 54 | 1, 2, 3, 6, 9, 18, 27, 54 | 8 | 120 | 66 | abundant, composite |
| 55 | 1, 5, 11, 55 | 4 | 72 | 17 | deficient, composite |
| 56 | 1, 2, 4, 7, 8, 14, 28, 56 | 8 | 120 | 64 | abundant, composite |
| 57 | 1, 3, 19, 57 | 4 | 80 | 23 | deficient, composite |
| 58 | 1, 2, 29, 58 | 4 | 90 | 32 | deficient, composite |
| 59 | 1, 59 | 2 | 60 | 1 | deficient, prime |
| 60 | 1, 2, 3, 4, 5, 6, 10, 12, 15, 20, 30, 60 | 12 | 168 | 108 | abundant, highly abundant, composite, highly composite, superior highly composite |
| n | Divisors | d(n) | σ(n) | s(n) | Notes |
| 61 | 1, 61 | 2 | 62 | 1 | deficient, prime |
| 62 | 1, 2, 31, 62 | 4 | 96 | 34 | deficient, composite |
| 63 | 1, 3, 7, 9, 21, 63 | 6 | 104 | 41 | deficient, composite |
| 64 | 1, 2, 4, 8, 16, 32, 64 | 7 | 127 | 63 | deficient, composite |
| 65 | 1, 5, 13, 65 | 4 | 84 | 19 | deficient, composite |
| 66 | 1, 2, 3, 6, 11, 22, 33, 66 | 8 | 144 | 78 | abundant, composite |
| 67 | 1, 67 | 2 | 68 | 1 | deficient, prime |
| 68 | 1, 2, 4, 17, 34, 68 | 6 | 126 | 58 | deficient, composite |
| 69 | 1, 3, 23, 69 | 4 | 96 | 27 | deficient, composite |
| 70 | 1, 2, 5, 7, 10, 14, 35, 70 | 8 | 144 | 74 | abundant, composite, primitive abundant, weird |
| 71 | 1, 71 | 2 | 72 | 1 | deficient, prime |
| 72 | 1, 2, 3, 4, 6, 8, 9, 12, 18, 24, 36, 72 | 12 | 195 | 123 | abundant, highly abundant, composite |
| 73 | 1, 73 | 2 | 74 | 1 | deficient, prime |
| 74 | 1, 2, 37, 74 | 4 | 114 | 40 | deficient, composite |
| 75 | 1, 3, 5, 15, 25, 75 | 6 | 124 | 49 | deficient, composite |
| 76 | 1, 2, 4, 19, 38, 76 | 6 | 140 | 64 | deficient, composite |
| 77 | 1, 7, 11, 77 | 4 | 96 | 19 | deficient, composite |
| 78 | 1, 2, 3, 6, 13, 26, 39, 78 | 8 | 168 | 90 | abundant, composite |
| 79 | 1, 79 | 2 | 80 | 1 | deficient, prime |
| 80 | 1, 2, 4, 5, 8, 10, 16, 20, 40, 80 | 10 | 186 | 106 | abundant, composite |
| n | Divisors | d(n) | σ(n) | s(n) | Notes |
| 81 | 1, 3, 9, 27, 81 | 5 | 121 | 40 | deficient, composite |
| 82 | 1, 2, 41, 82 | 4 | 126 | 44 | deficient, composite |
| 83 | 1, 83 | 2 | 84 | 1 | deficient, prime |
| 84 | 1, 2, 3, 4, 6, 7, 12, 14, 21, 28, 42, 84 | 12 | 224 | 140 | abundant, highly abundant, composite |
| 85 | 1, 5, 17, 85 | 4 | 108 | 23 | deficient, composite |
| 86 | 1, 2, 43, 86 | 4 | 132 | 46 | deficient, composite |
| 87 | 1, 3, 29, 87 | 4 | 120 | 33 | deficient, composite |
| 88 | 1, 2, 4, 8, 11, 22, 44, 88 | 8 | 180 | 92 | abundant, composite, primitive abundant |
| 89 | 1, 89 | 2 | 90 | 1 | deficient, prime |
| 90 | 1, 2, 3, 5, 6, 9, 10, 15, 18, 30, 45, 90 | 12 | 234 | 144 | abundant, highly abundant, composite |
| 91 | 1, 7, 13, 91 | 4 | 112 | 21 | deficient, composite |
| 92 | 1, 2, 4, 23, 46, 92 | 6 | 168 | 76 | deficient, composite |
| 93 | 1, 3, 31, 93 | 4 | 128 | 35 | deficient, composite |
| 94 | 1, 2, 47, 94 | 4 | 144 | 50 | deficient, composite |
| 95 | 1, 5, 19, 95 | 4 | 120 | 25 | deficient, composite |
| 96 | 1, 2, 3, 4, 6, 8, 12, 16, 24, 32, 48, 96 | 12 | 252 | 156 | abundant, highly abundant, composite |
| 97 | 1, 97 | 2 | 98 | 1 | deficient, prime |
| 98 | 1, 2, 7, 14, 49, 98 | 6 | 171 | 73 | deficient, composite |
| 99 | 1, 3, 9, 11, 33, 99 | 6 | 156 | 57 | deficient, composite |
| 100 | 1, 2, 4, 5, 10, 20, 25, 50, 100 | 9 | 217 | 117 | abundant, composite |

== 101 to 200 ==
| n | Divisors | d(n) | σ(n) | s(n) | Notes |
|---|---|---|---|---|---|
| 101 | 1, 101 | 2 | 102 | 1 | deficient, prime |
| 102 | 1, 2, 3, 6, 17, 34, 51, 102 | 8 | 216 | 114 | abundant, composite |
| 103 | 1, 103 | 2 | 104 | 1 | deficient, prime |
| 104 | 1, 2, 4, 8, 13, 26, 52, 104 | 8 | 210 | 106 | abundant, composite, primitive abundant |
| 105 | 1, 3, 5, 7, 15, 21, 35, 105 | 8 | 192 | 87 | deficient, composite |
| 106 | 1, 2, 53, 106 | 4 | 162 | 56 | deficient, composite |
| 107 | 1, 107 | 2 | 108 | 1 | deficient, prime |
| 108 | 1, 2, 3, 4, 6, 9, 12, 18, 27, 36, 54, 108 | 12 | 280 | 172 | abundant, highly abundant, composite |
| 109 | 1, 109 | 2 | 110 | 1 | deficient, prime |
| 110 | 1, 2, 5, 10, 11, 22, 55, 110 | 8 | 216 | 106 | deficient, composite |
| 111 | 1, 3, 37, 111 | 4 | 152 | 41 | deficient, composite |
| 112 | 1, 2, 4, 7, 8, 14, 16, 28, 56, 112 | 10 | 248 | 136 | abundant, composite |
| 113 | 1, 113 | 2 | 114 | 1 | deficient, prime |
| 114 | 1, 2, 3, 6, 19, 38, 57, 114 | 8 | 240 | 126 | abundant, composite |
| 115 | 1, 5, 23, 115 | 4 | 144 | 29 | deficient, composite |
| 116 | 1, 2, 4, 29, 58, 116 | 6 | 210 | 94 | deficient, composite |
| 117 | 1, 3, 9, 13, 39, 117 | 6 | 182 | 65 | deficient, composite |
| 118 | 1, 2, 59, 118 | 4 | 180 | 62 | deficient, composite |
| 119 | 1, 7, 17, 119 | 4 | 144 | 25 | deficient, composite |
| 120 | 1, 2, 3, 4, 5, 6, 8, 10, 12, 15, 20, 24, 30, 40, 60, 120 | 16 | 360 | 240 | abundant, highly abundant, composite, highly composite, superior highly composite |
| n | Divisors | d(n) | σ(n) | s(n) | Notes |
| 121 | 1, 11, 121 | 3 | 133 | 12 | deficient, composite |
| 122 | 1, 2, 61, 122 | 4 | 186 | 64 | deficient, composite |
| 123 | 1, 3, 41, 123 | 4 | 168 | 45 | deficient, composite |
| 124 | 1, 2, 4, 31, 62, 124 | 6 | 224 | 100 | deficient, composite |
| 125 | 1, 5, 25, 125 | 4 | 156 | 31 | deficient, composite |
| 126 | 1, 2, 3, 6, 7, 9, 14, 18, 21, 42, 63, 126 | 12 | 312 | 186 | abundant, composite |
| 127 | 1, 127 | 2 | 128 | 1 | deficient, prime |
| 128 | 1, 2, 4, 8, 16, 32, 64, 128 | 8 | 255 | 127 | deficient, composite |
| 129 | 1, 3, 43, 129 | 4 | 176 | 47 | deficient, composite |
| 130 | 1, 2, 5, 10, 13, 26, 65, 130 | 8 | 252 | 122 | deficient, composite |
| 131 | 1, 131 | 2 | 132 | 1 | deficient, prime |
| 132 | 1, 2, 3, 4, 6, 11, 12, 22, 33, 44, 66, 132 | 12 | 336 | 204 | abundant, composite |
| 133 | 1, 7, 19, 133 | 4 | 160 | 27 | deficient, composite |
| 134 | 1, 2, 67, 134 | 4 | 204 | 70 | deficient, composite |
| 135 | 1, 3, 5, 9, 15, 27, 45, 135 | 8 | 240 | 105 | deficient, composite |
| 136 | 1, 2, 4, 8, 17, 34, 68, 136 | 8 | 270 | 134 | deficient, composite |
| 137 | 1, 137 | 2 | 138 | 1 | deficient, prime |
| 138 | 1, 2, 3, 6, 23, 46, 69, 138 | 8 | 288 | 150 | abundant, composite |
| 139 | 1, 139 | 2 | 140 | 1 | deficient, prime |
| 140 | 1, 2, 4, 5, 7, 10, 14, 20, 28, 35, 70, 140 | 12 | 336 | 196 | abundant, composite |
| n | Divisors | d(n) | σ(n) | s(n) | Notes |
| 141 | 1, 3, 47, 141 | 4 | 192 | 51 | deficient, composite |
| 142 | 1, 2, 71, 142 | 4 | 216 | 74 | deficient, composite |
| 143 | 1, 11, 13, 143 | 4 | 168 | 25 | deficient, composite |
| 144 | 1, 2, 3, 4, 6, 8, 9, 12, 16, 18, 24, 36, 48, 72, 144 | 15 | 403 | 259 | abundant, highly abundant, composite |
| 145 | 1, 5, 29, 145 | 4 | 180 | 35 | deficient, composite |
| 146 | 1, 2, 73, 146 | 4 | 222 | 76 | deficient, composite |
| 147 | 1, 3, 7, 21, 49, 147 | 6 | 228 | 81 | deficient, composite |
| 148 | 1, 2, 4, 37, 74, 148 | 6 | 266 | 118 | deficient, composite |
| 149 | 1, 149 | 2 | 150 | 1 | deficient, prime |
| 150 | 1, 2, 3, 5, 6, 10, 15, 25, 30, 50, 75, 150 | 12 | 372 | 222 | abundant, composite |
| 151 | 1, 151 | 2 | 152 | 1 | deficient, prime |
| 152 | 1, 2, 4, 8, 19, 38, 76, 152 | 8 | 300 | 148 | deficient, composite |
| 153 | 1, 3, 9, 17, 51, 153 | 6 | 234 | 81 | deficient, composite |
| 154 | 1, 2, 7, 11, 14, 22, 77, 154 | 8 | 288 | 134 | deficient, composite |
| 155 | 1, 5, 31, 155 | 4 | 192 | 37 | deficient, composite |
| 156 | 1, 2, 3, 4, 6, 12, 13, 26, 39, 52, 78, 156 | 12 | 392 | 236 | abundant, composite |
| 157 | 1, 157 | 2 | 158 | 1 | deficient, prime |
| 158 | 1, 2, 79, 158 | 4 | 240 | 82 | deficient, composite |
| 159 | 1, 3, 53, 159 | 4 | 216 | 57 | deficient, composite |
| 160 | 1, 2, 4, 5, 8, 10, 16, 20, 32, 40, 80, 160 | 12 | 378 | 218 | abundant, composite |
| n | Divisors | d(n) | σ(n) | s(n) | Notes |
| 161 | 1, 7, 23, 161 | 4 | 192 | 31 | deficient, composite |
| 162 | 1, 2, 3, 6, 9, 18, 27, 54, 81, 162 | 10 | 363 | 201 | abundant, composite |
| 163 | 1, 163 | 2 | 164 | 1 | deficient, prime |
| 164 | 1, 2, 4, 41, 82, 164 | 6 | 294 | 130 | deficient, composite |
| 165 | 1, 3, 5, 11, 15, 33, 55, 165 | 8 | 288 | 123 | deficient, composite |
| 166 | 1, 2, 83, 166 | 4 | 252 | 86 | deficient, composite |
| 167 | 1, 167 | 2 | 168 | 1 | deficient, prime |
| 168 | 1, 2, 3, 4, 6, 7, 8, 12, 14, 21, 24, 28, 42, 56, 84, 168 | 16 | 480 | 312 | abundant, highly abundant, composite |
| 169 | 1, 13, 169 | 3 | 183 | 14 | deficient, composite |
| 170 | 1, 2, 5, 10, 17, 34, 85, 170 | 8 | 324 | 154 | deficient, composite |
| 171 | 1, 3, 9, 19, 57, 171 | 6 | 260 | 89 | deficient, composite |
| 172 | 1, 2, 4, 43, 86, 172 | 6 | 308 | 136 | deficient, composite |
| 173 | 1, 173 | 2 | 174 | 1 | deficient, prime |
| 174 | 1, 2, 3, 6, 29, 58, 87, 174 | 8 | 360 | 186 | abundant, composite |
| 175 | 1, 5, 7, 25, 35, 175 | 6 | 248 | 73 | deficient, composite |
| 176 | 1, 2, 4, 8, 11, 16, 22, 44, 88, 176 | 10 | 372 | 196 | abundant, composite |
| 177 | 1, 3, 59, 177 | 4 | 240 | 63 | deficient, composite |
| 178 | 1, 2, 89, 178 | 4 | 270 | 92 | deficient, composite |
| 179 | 1, 179 | 2 | 180 | 1 | deficient, prime |
| 180 | 1, 2, 3, 4, 5, 6, 9, 10, 12, 15, 18, 20, 30, 36, 45, 60, 90, 180 | 18 | 546 | 366 | abundant, highly abundant, composite, highly composite |
| n | Divisors | d(n) | σ(n) | s(n) | Notes |
| 181 | 1, 181 | 2 | 182 | 1 | deficient, prime |
| 182 | 1, 2, 7, 13, 14, 26, 91, 182 | 8 | 336 | 154 | deficient, composite |
| 183 | 1, 3, 61, 183 | 4 | 248 | 65 | deficient, composite |
| 184 | 1, 2, 4, 8, 23, 46, 92, 184 | 8 | 360 | 176 | deficient, composite |
| 185 | 1, 5, 37, 185 | 4 | 228 | 43 | deficient, composite |
| 186 | 1, 2, 3, 6, 31, 62, 93, 186 | 8 | 384 | 198 | abundant, composite |
| 187 | 1, 11, 17, 187 | 4 | 216 | 29 | deficient, composite |
| 188 | 1, 2, 4, 47, 94, 188 | 6 | 336 | 148 | deficient, composite |
| 189 | 1, 3, 7, 9, 21, 27, 63, 189 | 8 | 320 | 131 | deficient, composite |
| 190 | 1, 2, 5, 10, 19, 38, 95, 190 | 8 | 360 | 170 | deficient, composite |
| 191 | 1, 191 | 2 | 192 | 1 | deficient, prime |
| 192 | 1, 2, 3, 4, 6, 8, 12, 16, 24, 32, 48, 64, 96, 192 | 14 | 508 | 316 | abundant, composite |
| 193 | 1, 193 | 2 | 194 | 1 | deficient, prime |
| 194 | 1, 2, 97, 194 | 4 | 294 | 100 | deficient, composite |
| 195 | 1, 3, 5, 13, 15, 39, 65, 195 | 8 | 336 | 141 | deficient, composite |
| 196 | 1, 2, 4, 7, 14, 28, 49, 98, 196 | 9 | 399 | 203 | abundant, composite |
| 197 | 1, 197 | 2 | 198 | 1 | deficient, prime |
| 198 | 1, 2, 3, 6, 9, 11, 18, 22, 33, 66, 99, 198 | 12 | 468 | 270 | abundant, composite |
| 199 | 1, 199 | 2 | 200 | 1 | deficient, prime |
| 200 | 1, 2, 4, 5, 8, 10, 20, 25, 40, 50, 100, 200 | 12 | 465 | 265 | abundant, composite |

== 201 to 300 ==
| n | Divisors | d(n) | σ(n) | s(n) | Notes |
|---|---|---|---|---|---|
| 201 | 1, 3, 67, 201 | 4 | 272 | 71 | deficient, composite |
| 202 | 1, 2, 101, 202 | 4 | 306 | 104 | deficient, composite |
| 203 | 1, 7, 29, 203 | 4 | 240 | 37 | deficient, composite |
| 204 | 1, 2, 3, 4, 6, 12, 17, 34, 51, 68, 102, 204 | 12 | 504 | 300 | abundant, composite |
| 205 | 1, 5, 41, 205 | 4 | 252 | 47 | deficient, composite |
| 206 | 1, 2, 103, 206 | 4 | 312 | 106 | deficient, composite |
| 207 | 1, 3, 9, 23, 69, 207 | 6 | 312 | 105 | deficient, composite |
| 208 | 1, 2, 4, 8, 13, 16, 26, 52, 104, 208 | 10 | 434 | 226 | abundant, composite |
| 209 | 1, 11, 19, 209 | 4 | 240 | 31 | deficient, composite |
| 210 | 1, 2, 3, 5, 6, 7, 10, 14, 15, 21, 30, 35, 42, 70, 105, 210 | 16 | 576 | 366 | abundant, highly abundant, composite |
| 211 | 1, 211 | 2 | 212 | 1 | deficient, prime |
| 212 | 1, 2, 4, 53, 106, 212 | 6 | 378 | 166 | deficient, composite |
| 213 | 1, 3, 71, 213 | 4 | 288 | 75 | deficient, composite |
| 214 | 1, 2, 107, 214 | 4 | 324 | 110 | deficient, composite |
| 215 | 1, 5, 43, 215 | 4 | 264 | 49 | deficient, composite |
| 216 | 1, 2, 3, 4, 6, 8, 9, 12, 18, 24, 27, 36, 54, 72, 108, 216 | 16 | 600 | 384 | abundant, highly abundant, composite |
| 217 | 1, 7, 31, 217 | 4 | 256 | 39 | deficient, composite |
| 218 | 1, 2, 109, 218 | 4 | 330 | 112 | deficient, composite |
| 219 | 1, 3, 73, 219 | 4 | 296 | 77 | deficient, composite |
| 220 | 1, 2, 4, 5, 10, 11, 20, 22, 44, 55, 110, 220 | 12 | 504 | 284 | abundant, composite |
| n | Divisors | d(n) | σ(n) | s(n) | Notes |
| 221 | 1, 13, 17, 221 | 4 | 252 | 31 | deficient, composite |
| 222 | 1, 2, 3, 6, 37, 74, 111, 222 | 8 | 456 | 234 | abundant, composite |
| 223 | 1, 223 | 2 | 224 | 1 | deficient, prime |
| 224 | 1, 2, 4, 7, 8, 14, 16, 28, 32, 56, 112, 224 | 12 | 504 | 280 | abundant, composite |
| 225 | 1, 3, 5, 9, 15, 25, 45, 75, 225 | 9 | 403 | 178 | deficient, composite |
| 226 | 1, 2, 113, 226 | 4 | 342 | 116 | deficient, composite |
| 227 | 1, 227 | 2 | 228 | 1 | deficient, prime |
| 228 | 1, 2, 3, 4, 6, 12, 19, 38, 57, 76, 114, 228 | 12 | 560 | 332 | abundant, composite |
| 229 | 1, 229 | 2 | 230 | 1 | deficient, prime |
| 230 | 1, 2, 5, 10, 23, 46, 115, 230 | 8 | 432 | 202 | deficient, composite |
| 231 | 1, 3, 7, 11, 21, 33, 77, 231 | 8 | 384 | 153 | deficient, composite |
| 232 | 1, 2, 4, 8, 29, 58, 116, 232 | 8 | 450 | 218 | deficient, composite |
| 233 | 1, 233 | 2 | 234 | 1 | deficient, prime |
| 234 | 1, 2, 3, 6, 9, 13, 18, 26, 39, 78, 117, 234 | 12 | 546 | 312 | abundant, composite |
| 235 | 1, 5, 47, 235 | 4 | 288 | 53 | deficient, composite |
| 236 | 1, 2, 4, 59, 118, 236 | 6 | 420 | 184 | deficient, composite |
| 237 | 1, 3, 79, 237 | 4 | 320 | 83 | deficient, composite |
| 238 | 1, 2, 7, 14, 17, 34, 119, 238 | 8 | 432 | 194 | deficient, composite |
| 239 | 1, 239 | 2 | 240 | 1 | deficient, prime |
| 240 | 1, 2, 3, 4, 5, 6, 8, 10, 12, 15, 16, 20, 24, 30, 40, 48, 60, 80, 120, 240 | 20 | 744 | 504 | abundant, highly abundant, composite, highly composite |
| n | Divisors | d(n) | σ(n) | s(n) | Notes |
| 241 | 1, 241 | 2 | 242 | 1 | deficient, prime |
| 242 | 1, 2, 11, 22, 121, 242 | 6 | 399 | 157 | deficient, composite |
| 243 | 1, 3, 9, 27, 81, 243 | 6 | 364 | 121 | deficient, composite |
| 244 | 1, 2, 4, 61, 122, 244 | 6 | 434 | 190 | deficient, composite |
| 245 | 1, 5, 7, 35, 49, 245 | 6 | 342 | 97 | deficient, composite |
| 246 | 1, 2, 3, 6, 41, 82, 123, 246 | 8 | 504 | 258 | abundant, composite |
| 247 | 1, 13, 19, 247 | 4 | 280 | 33 | deficient, composite |
| 248 | 1, 2, 4, 8, 31, 62, 124, 248 | 8 | 480 | 232 | deficient, composite |
| 249 | 1, 3, 83, 249 | 4 | 336 | 87 | deficient, composite |
| 250 | 1, 2, 5, 10, 25, 50, 125, 250 | 8 | 468 | 218 | deficient, composite |
| 251 | 1, 251 | 2 | 252 | 1 | deficient, prime |
| 252 | 1, 2, 3, 4, 6, 7, 9, 12, 14, 18, 21, 28, 36, 42, 63, 84, 126, 252 | 18 | 728 | 476 | abundant, composite |
| 253 | 1, 11, 23, 253 | 4 | 288 | 35 | deficient, composite |
| 254 | 1, 2, 127, 254 | 4 | 384 | 130 | deficient, composite |
| 255 | 1, 3, 5, 15, 17, 51, 85, 255 | 8 | 432 | 177 | deficient, composite |
| 256 | 1, 2, 4, 8, 16, 32, 64, 128, 256 | 9 | 511 | 255 | deficient, composite |
| 257 | 1, 257 | 2 | 258 | 1 | deficient, prime |
| 258 | 1, 2, 3, 6, 43, 86, 129, 258 | 8 | 528 | 270 | abundant, composite |
| 259 | 1, 7, 37, 259 | 4 | 304 | 45 | deficient, composite |
| 260 | 1, 2, 4, 5, 10, 13, 20, 26, 52, 65, 130, 260 | 12 | 588 | 328 | abundant, composite |
| n | Divisors | d(n) | σ(n) | s(n) | Notes |
| 261 | 1, 3, 9, 29, 87, 261 | 6 | 390 | 129 | deficient, composite |
| 262 | 1, 2, 131, 262 | 4 | 396 | 134 | deficient, composite |
| 263 | 1, 263 | 2 | 264 | 1 | deficient, prime |
| 264 | 1, 2, 3, 4, 6, 8, 11, 12, 22, 24, 33, 44, 66, 88, 132, 264 | 16 | 720 | 456 | abundant, composite |
| 265 | 1, 5, 53, 265 | 4 | 324 | 59 | deficient, composite |
| 266 | 1, 2, 7, 14, 19, 38, 133, 266 | 8 | 480 | 214 | deficient, composite |
| 267 | 1, 3, 89, 267 | 4 | 360 | 93 | deficient, composite |
| 268 | 1, 2, 4, 67, 134, 268 | 6 | 476 | 208 | deficient, composite |
| 269 | 1, 269 | 2 | 270 | 1 | deficient, prime |
| 270 | 1, 2, 3, 5, 6, 9, 10, 15, 18, 27, 30, 45, 54, 90, 135, 270 | 16 | 720 | 450 | abundant, composite |
| 271 | 1, 271 | 2 | 272 | 1 | deficient, prime |
| 272 | 1, 2, 4, 8, 16, 17, 34, 68, 136, 272 | 10 | 558 | 286 | abundant, composite, primitive abundant |
| 273 | 1, 3, 7, 13, 21, 39, 91, 273 | 8 | 448 | 175 | deficient, composite |
| 274 | 1, 2, 137, 274 | 4 | 414 | 140 | deficient, composite |
| 275 | 1, 5, 11, 25, 55, 275 | 6 | 372 | 97 | deficient, composite |
| 276 | 1, 2, 3, 4, 6, 12, 23, 46, 69, 92, 138, 276 | 12 | 672 | 396 | abundant, composite |
| 277 | 1, 277 | 2 | 278 | 1 | deficient, prime |
| 278 | 1, 2, 139, 278 | 4 | 420 | 142 | deficient, composite |
| 279 | 1, 3, 9, 31, 93, 279 | 6 | 416 | 137 | deficient, composite |
| 280 | 1, 2, 4, 5, 7, 8, 10, 14, 20, 28, 35, 40, 56, 70, 140, 280 | 16 | 720 | 440 | abundant, composite |
| n | Divisors | d(n) | σ(n) | s(n) | Notes |
| 281 | 1, 281 | 2 | 282 | 1 | deficient, prime |
| 282 | 1, 2, 3, 6, 47, 94, 141, 282 | 8 | 576 | 294 | abundant, composite |
| 283 | 1, 283 | 2 | 284 | 1 | deficient, prime |
| 284 | 1, 2, 4, 71, 142, 284 | 6 | 504 | 220 | deficient, composite |
| 285 | 1, 3, 5, 15, 19, 57, 95, 285 | 8 | 480 | 195 | deficient, composite |
| 286 | 1, 2, 11, 13, 22, 26, 143, 286 | 8 | 504 | 218 | deficient, composite |
| 287 | 1, 7, 41, 287 | 4 | 336 | 49 | deficient, composite |
| 288 | 1, 2, 3, 4, 6, 8, 9, 12, 16, 18, 24, 32, 36, 48, 72, 96, 144, 288 | 18 | 819 | 531 | abundant, highly abundant, composite |
| 289 | 1, 17, 289 | 3 | 307 | 18 | deficient, composite |
| 290 | 1, 2, 5, 10, 29, 58, 145, 290 | 8 | 540 | 250 | deficient, composite |
| 291 | 1, 3, 97, 291 | 4 | 392 | 101 | deficient, composite |
| 292 | 1, 2, 4, 73, 146, 292 | 6 | 518 | 226 | deficient, composite |
| 293 | 1, 293 | 2 | 294 | 1 | deficient, prime |
| 294 | 1, 2, 3, 6, 7, 14, 21, 42, 49, 98, 147, 294 | 12 | 684 | 390 | abundant, composite |
| 295 | 1, 5, 59, 295 | 4 | 360 | 65 | deficient, composite |
| 296 | 1, 2, 4, 8, 37, 74, 148, 296 | 8 | 570 | 274 | deficient, composite |
| 297 | 1, 3, 9, 11, 27, 33, 99, 297 | 8 | 480 | 183 | deficient, composite |
| 298 | 1, 2, 149, 298 | 4 | 450 | 152 | deficient, composite |
| 299 | 1, 13, 23, 299 | 4 | 336 | 37 | deficient, composite |
| 300 | 1, 2, 3, 4, 5, 6, 10, 12, 15, 20, 25, 30, 50, 60, 75, 100, 150, 300 | 18 | 868 | 568 | abundant, highly abundant, composite |

== 301 to 400 ==
| n | Divisors | d(n) | σ(n) | s(n) | Notes |
|---|---|---|---|---|---|
| 301 | 1, 7, 43, 301 | 4 | 352 | 51 | deficient, composite |
| 302 | 1, 2, 151, 302 | 4 | 456 | 154 | deficient, composite |
| 303 | 1, 3, 101, 303 | 4 | 408 | 105 | deficient, composite |
| 304 | 1, 2, 4, 8, 16, 19, 38, 76, 152, 304 | 10 | 620 | 316 | abundant, composite, primitive abundant |
| 305 | 1, 5, 61, 305 | 4 | 372 | 67 | deficient, composite |
| 306 | 1, 2, 3, 6, 9, 17, 18, 34, 51, 102, 153, 306 | 12 | 702 | 396 | abundant, composite |
| 307 | 1, 307 | 2 | 308 | 1 | deficient, prime |
| 308 | 1, 2, 4, 7, 11, 14, 22, 28, 44, 77, 154, 308 | 12 | 672 | 364 | abundant, composite |
| 309 | 1, 3, 103, 309 | 4 | 416 | 107 | deficient, composite |
| 310 | 1, 2, 5, 10, 31, 62, 155, 310 | 8 | 576 | 266 | deficient, composite |
| 311 | 1, 311 | 2 | 312 | 1 | deficient, prime |
| 312 | 1, 2, 3, 4, 6, 8, 12, 13, 24, 26, 39, 52, 78, 104, 156, 312 | 16 | 840 | 528 | abundant, composite |
| 313 | 1, 313 | 2 | 314 | 1 | deficient, prime |
| 314 | 1, 2, 157, 314 | 4 | 474 | 160 | deficient, composite |
| 315 | 1, 3, 5, 7, 9, 15, 21, 35, 45, 63, 105, 315 | 12 | 624 | 309 | deficient, composite |
| 316 | 1, 2, 4, 79, 158, 316 | 6 | 560 | 244 | deficient, composite |
| 317 | 1, 317 | 2 | 318 | 1 | deficient, prime |
| 318 | 1, 2, 3, 6, 53, 106, 159, 318 | 8 | 648 | 330 | abundant, composite |
| 319 | 1, 11, 29, 319 | 4 | 360 | 41 | deficient, composite |
| 320 | 1, 2, 4, 5, 8, 10, 16, 20, 32, 40, 64, 80, 160, 320 | 14 | 762 | 442 | abundant, composite |
| n | Divisors | d(n) | σ(n) | s(n) | Notes |
| 321 | 1, 3, 107, 321 | 4 | 432 | 111 | deficient, composite |
| 322 | 1, 2, 7, 14, 23, 46, 161, 322 | 8 | 576 | 254 | deficient, composite |
| 323 | 1, 17, 19, 323 | 4 | 360 | 37 | deficient, composite |
| 324 | 1, 2, 3, 4, 6, 9, 12, 18, 27, 36, 54, 81, 108, 162, 324 | 15 | 847 | 523 | abundant, composite |
| 325 | 1, 5, 13, 25, 65, 325 | 6 | 434 | 109 | deficient, composite |
| 326 | 1, 2, 163, 326 | 4 | 492 | 166 | deficient, composite |
| 327 | 1, 3, 109, 327 | 4 | 440 | 113 | deficient, composite |
| 328 | 1, 2, 4, 8, 41, 82, 164, 328 | 8 | 630 | 302 | deficient, composite |
| 329 | 1, 7, 47, 329 | 4 | 384 | 55 | deficient, composite |
| 330 | 1, 2, 3, 5, 6, 10, 11, 15, 22, 30, 33, 55, 66, 110, 165, 330 | 16 | 864 | 534 | abundant, composite |
| 331 | 1, 331 | 2 | 332 | 1 | deficient, prime |
| 332 | 1, 2, 4, 83, 166, 332 | 6 | 588 | 256 | deficient, composite |
| 333 | 1, 3, 9, 37, 111, 333 | 6 | 494 | 161 | deficient, composite |
| 334 | 1, 2, 167, 334 | 4 | 504 | 170 | deficient, composite |
| 335 | 1, 5, 67, 335 | 4 | 408 | 73 | deficient, composite |
| 336 | 1, 2, 3, 4, 6, 7, 8, 12, 14, 16, 21, 24, 28, 42, 48, 56, 84, 112, 168, 336 | 20 | 992 | 656 | abundant, highly abundant, composite |
| 337 | 1, 337 | 2 | 338 | 1 | deficient, prime |
| 338 | 1, 2, 13, 26, 169, 338 | 6 | 549 | 211 | deficient, composite |
| 339 | 1, 3, 113, 339 | 4 | 456 | 117 | deficient, composite |
| 340 | 1, 2, 4, 5, 10, 17, 20, 34, 68, 85, 170, 340 | 12 | 756 | 416 | abundant, composite |
| n | Divisors | d(n) | σ(n) | s(n) | Notes |
| 341 | 1, 11, 31, 341 | 4 | 384 | 43 | deficient, composite |
| 342 | 1, 2, 3, 6, 9, 18, 19, 38, 57, 114, 171, 342 | 12 | 780 | 438 | abundant, composite |
| 343 | 1, 7, 49, 343 | 4 | 400 | 57 | deficient, composite |
| 344 | 1, 2, 4, 8, 43, 86, 172, 344 | 8 | 660 | 316 | deficient, composite |
| 345 | 1, 3, 5, 15, 23, 69, 115, 345 | 8 | 576 | 231 | deficient, composite |
| 346 | 1, 2, 173, 346 | 4 | 522 | 176 | deficient, composite |
| 347 | 1, 347 | 2 | 348 | 1 | deficient, prime |
| 348 | 1, 2, 3, 4, 6, 12, 29, 58, 87, 116, 174, 348 | 12 | 840 | 492 | abundant, composite |
| 349 | 1, 349 | 2 | 350 | 1 | deficient, prime |
| 350 | 1, 2, 5, 7, 10, 14, 25, 35, 50, 70, 175, 350 | 12 | 744 | 394 | abundant, composite |
| 351 | 1, 3, 9, 13, 27, 39, 117, 351 | 8 | 560 | 209 | deficient, composite |
| 352 | 1, 2, 4, 8, 11, 16, 22, 32, 44, 88, 176, 352 | 12 | 756 | 404 | abundant, composite |
| 353 | 1, 353 | 2 | 354 | 1 | deficient, prime |
| 354 | 1, 2, 3, 6, 59, 118, 177, 354 | 8 | 720 | 366 | abundant, composite |
| 355 | 1, 5, 71, 355 | 4 | 432 | 77 | deficient, composite |
| 356 | 1, 2, 4, 89, 178, 356 | 6 | 630 | 274 | deficient, composite |
| 357 | 1, 3, 7, 17, 21, 51, 119, 357 | 8 | 576 | 219 | deficient, composite |
| 358 | 1, 2, 179, 358 | 4 | 540 | 182 | deficient, composite |
| 359 | 1, 359 | 2 | 360 | 1 | deficient, prime |
| 360 | 1, 2, 3, 4, 5, 6, 8, 9, 10, 12, 15, 18, 20, 24, 30, 36, 40, 45, 60, 72, 90, 120, 180, 360 | 24 | 1170 | 810 | abundant, highly abundant, composite, highly composite, superior highly composite |
| n | Divisors | d(n) | σ(n) | s(n) | Notes |
| 361 | 1, 19, 361 | 3 | 381 | 20 | deficient, composite |
| 362 | 1, 2, 181, 362 | 4 | 546 | 184 | deficient, composite |
| 363 | 1, 3, 11, 33, 121, 363 | 6 | 532 | 169 | deficient, composite |
| 364 | 1, 2, 4, 7, 13, 14, 26, 28, 52, 91, 182, 364 | 12 | 784 | 420 | abundant, composite |
| 365 | 1, 5, 73, 365 | 4 | 444 | 79 | deficient, composite |
| 366 | 1, 2, 3, 6, 61, 122, 183, 366 | 8 | 744 | 378 | abundant, composite |
| 367 | 1, 367 | 2 | 368 | 1 | deficient, prime |
| 368 | 1, 2, 4, 8, 16, 23, 46, 92, 184, 368 | 10 | 744 | 376 | abundant, composite, primitive abundant |
| 369 | 1, 3, 9, 41, 123, 369 | 6 | 546 | 177 | deficient, composite |
| 370 | 1, 2, 5, 10, 37, 74, 185, 370 | 8 | 684 | 314 | deficient, composite |
| 371 | 1, 7, 53, 371 | 4 | 432 | 61 | deficient, composite |
| 372 | 1, 2, 3, 4, 6, 12, 31, 62, 93, 124, 186, 372 | 12 | 896 | 524 | abundant, composite |
| 373 | 1, 373 | 2 | 374 | 1 | deficient, prime |
| 374 | 1, 2, 11, 17, 22, 34, 187, 374 | 8 | 648 | 274 | deficient, composite |
| 375 | 1, 3, 5, 15, 25, 75, 125, 375 | 8 | 624 | 249 | deficient, composite |
| 376 | 1, 2, 4, 8, 47, 94, 188, 376 | 8 | 720 | 344 | deficient, composite |
| 377 | 1, 13, 29, 377 | 4 | 420 | 43 | deficient, composite |
| 378 | 1, 2, 3, 6, 7, 9, 14, 18, 21, 27, 42, 54, 63, 126, 189, 378 | 16 | 960 | 582 | abundant, composite |
| 379 | 1, 379 | 2 | 380 | 1 | deficient, prime |
| 380 | 1, 2, 4, 5, 10, 19, 20, 38, 76, 95, 190, 380 | 12 | 840 | 460 | abundant, composite |
| n | Divisors | d(n) | σ(n) | s(n) | Notes |
| 381 | 1, 3, 127, 381 | 4 | 512 | 131 | deficient, composite |
| 382 | 1, 2, 191, 382 | 4 | 576 | 194 | deficient, composite |
| 383 | 1, 383 | 2 | 384 | 1 | deficient, prime |
| 384 | 1, 2, 3, 4, 6, 8, 12, 16, 24, 32, 48, 64, 96, 128, 192, 384 | 16 | 1020 | 636 | abundant, composite |
| 385 | 1, 5, 7, 11, 35, 55, 77, 385 | 8 | 576 | 191 | deficient, composite |
| 386 | 1, 2, 193, 386 | 4 | 582 | 196 | deficient, composite |
| 387 | 1, 3, 9, 43, 129, 387 | 6 | 572 | 185 | deficient, composite |
| 388 | 1, 2, 4, 97, 194, 388 | 6 | 686 | 298 | deficient, composite |
| 389 | 1, 389 | 2 | 390 | 1 | deficient, prime |
| 390 | 1, 2, 3, 5, 6, 10, 13, 15, 26, 30, 39, 65, 78, 130, 195, 390 | 16 | 1008 | 618 | abundant, composite |
| 391 | 1, 17, 23, 391 | 4 | 432 | 41 | deficient, composite |
| 392 | 1, 2, 4, 7, 8, 14, 28, 49, 56, 98, 196, 392 | 12 | 855 | 463 | abundant, composite |
| 393 | 1, 3, 131, 393 | 4 | 528 | 135 | deficient, composite |
| 394 | 1, 2, 197, 394 | 4 | 594 | 200 | deficient, composite |
| 395 | 1, 5, 79, 395 | 4 | 480 | 85 | deficient, composite |
| 396 | 1, 2, 3, 4, 6, 9, 11, 12, 18, 22, 33, 36, 44, 66, 99, 132, 198, 396 | 18 | 1092 | 696 | abundant, composite |
| 397 | 1, 397 | 2 | 398 | 1 | deficient, prime |
| 398 | 1, 2, 199, 398 | 4 | 600 | 202 | deficient, composite |
| 399 | 1, 3, 7, 19, 21, 57, 133, 399 | 8 | 640 | 241 | deficient, composite |
| 400 | 1, 2, 4, 5, 8, 10, 16, 20, 25, 40, 50, 80, 100, 200, 400 | 15 | 961 | 561 | abundant, composite |

== 401 to 500 ==
| n | Divisors | d(n) | σ(n) | s(n) | Notes |
|---|---|---|---|---|---|
| 401 | 1, 401 | 2 | 402 | 1 | deficient, prime |
| 402 | 1, 2, 3, 6, 67, 134, 201, 402 | 8 | 816 | 414 | abundant, composite |
| 403 | 1, 13, 31, 403 | 4 | 448 | 45 | deficient, composite |
| 404 | 1, 2, 4, 101, 202, 404 | 6 | 714 | 310 | deficient, composite |
| 405 | 1, 3, 5, 9, 15, 27, 45, 81, 135, 405 | 10 | 726 | 321 | deficient, composite |
| 406 | 1, 2, 7, 14, 29, 58, 203, 406 | 8 | 720 | 314 | deficient, composite |
| 407 | 1, 11, 37, 407 | 4 | 456 | 49 | deficient, composite |
| 408 | 1, 2, 3, 4, 6, 8, 12, 17, 24, 34, 51, 68, 102, 136, 204, 408 | 16 | 1080 | 672 | abundant, composite |
| 409 | 1, 409 | 2 | 410 | 1 | deficient, prime |
| 410 | 1, 2, 5, 10, 41, 82, 205, 410 | 8 | 756 | 346 | deficient, composite |
| 411 | 1, 3, 137, 411 | 4 | 552 | 141 | deficient, composite |
| 412 | 1, 2, 4, 103, 206, 412 | 6 | 728 | 316 | deficient, composite |
| 413 | 1, 7, 59, 413 | 4 | 480 | 67 | deficient, composite |
| 414 | 1, 2, 3, 6, 9, 18, 23, 46, 69, 138, 207, 414 | 12 | 936 | 522 | abundant, composite |
| 415 | 1, 5, 83, 415 | 4 | 504 | 89 | deficient, composite |
| 416 | 1, 2, 4, 8, 13, 16, 26, 32, 52, 104, 208, 416 | 12 | 882 | 466 | abundant, composite |
| 417 | 1, 3, 139, 417 | 4 | 560 | 143 | deficient, composite |
| 418 | 1, 2, 11, 19, 22, 38, 209, 418 | 8 | 720 | 302 | deficient, composite |
| 419 | 1, 419 | 2 | 420 | 1 | deficient, prime |
| 420 | 1, 2, 3, 4, 5, 6, 7, 10, 12, 14, 15, 20, 21, 28, 30, 35, 42, 60, 70, 84, 105, 140, 210, 420 | 24 | 1344 | 924 | abundant, highly abundant, composite |
| n | Divisors | d(n) | σ(n) | s(n) | Notes |
| 421 | 1, 421 | 2 | 422 | 1 | deficient, prime |
| 422 | 1, 2, 211, 422 | 4 | 636 | 214 | deficient, composite |
| 423 | 1, 3, 9, 47, 141, 423 | 6 | 624 | 201 | deficient, composite |
| 424 | 1, 2, 4, 8, 53, 106, 212, 424 | 8 | 810 | 386 | deficient, composite |
| 425 | 1, 5, 17, 25, 85, 425 | 6 | 558 | 133 | deficient, composite |
| 426 | 1, 2, 3, 6, 71, 142, 213, 426 | 8 | 864 | 438 | abundant, composite |
| 427 | 1, 7, 61, 427 | 4 | 496 | 69 | deficient, composite |
| 428 | 1, 2, 4, 107, 214, 428 | 6 | 756 | 328 | deficient, composite |
| 429 | 1, 3, 11, 13, 33, 39, 143, 429 | 8 | 672 | 243 | deficient, composite |
| 430 | 1, 2, 5, 10, 43, 86, 215, 430 | 8 | 792 | 362 | deficient, composite |
| 431 | 1, 431 | 2 | 432 | 1 | deficient, prime |
| 432 | 1, 2, 3, 4, 6, 8, 9, 12, 16, 18, 24, 27, 36, 48, 54, 72, 108, 144, 216, 432 | 20 | 1240 | 808 | abundant, composite |
| 433 | 1, 433 | 2 | 434 | 1 | deficient, prime |
| 434 | 1, 2, 7, 14, 31, 62, 217, 434 | 8 | 768 | 334 | deficient, composite |
| 435 | 1, 3, 5, 15, 29, 87, 145, 435 | 8 | 720 | 285 | deficient, composite |
| 436 | 1, 2, 4, 109, 218, 436 | 6 | 770 | 334 | deficient, composite |
| 437 | 1, 19, 23, 437 | 4 | 480 | 43 | deficient, composite |
| 438 | 1, 2, 3, 6, 73, 146, 219, 438 | 8 | 888 | 450 | abundant, composite |
| 439 | 1, 439 | 2 | 440 | 1 | deficient, prime |
| 440 | 1, 2, 4, 5, 8, 10, 11, 20, 22, 40, 44, 55, 88, 110, 220, 440 | 16 | 1080 | 640 | abundant, composite |
| n | Divisors | d(n) | σ(n) | s(n) | Notes |
| 441 | 1, 3, 7, 9, 21, 49, 63, 147, 441 | 9 | 741 | 300 | deficient, composite |
| 442 | 1, 2, 13, 17, 26, 34, 221, 442 | 8 | 756 | 314 | deficient, composite |
| 443 | 1, 443 | 2 | 444 | 1 | deficient, prime |
| 444 | 1, 2, 3, 4, 6, 12, 37, 74, 111, 148, 222, 444 | 12 | 1064 | 620 | abundant, composite |
| 445 | 1, 5, 89, 445 | 4 | 540 | 95 | deficient, composite |
| 446 | 1, 2, 223, 446 | 4 | 672 | 226 | deficient, composite |
| 447 | 1, 3, 149, 447 | 4 | 600 | 153 | deficient, composite |
| 448 | 1, 2, 4, 7, 8, 14, 16, 28, 32, 56, 64, 112, 224, 448 | 14 | 1016 | 568 | abundant, composite |
| 449 | 1, 449 | 2 | 450 | 1 | deficient, prime |
| 450 | 1, 2, 3, 5, 6, 9, 10, 15, 18, 25, 30, 45, 50, 75, 90, 150, 225, 450 | 18 | 1209 | 759 | abundant, composite |
| 451 | 1, 11, 41, 451 | 4 | 504 | 53 | deficient, composite |
| 452 | 1, 2, 4, 113, 226, 452 | 6 | 798 | 346 | deficient, composite |
| 453 | 1, 3, 151, 453 | 4 | 608 | 155 | deficient, composite |
| 454 | 1, 2, 227, 454 | 4 | 684 | 230 | deficient, composite |
| 455 | 1, 5, 7, 13, 35, 65, 91, 455 | 8 | 672 | 217 | deficient, composite |
| 456 | 1, 2, 3, 4, 6, 8, 12, 19, 24, 38, 57, 76, 114, 152, 228, 456 | 16 | 1200 | 744 | abundant, composite |
| 457 | 1, 457 | 2 | 458 | 1 | deficient, prime |
| 458 | 1, 2, 229, 458 | 4 | 690 | 232 | deficient, composite |
| 459 | 1, 3, 9, 17, 27, 51, 153, 459 | 8 | 720 | 261 | deficient, composite |
| 460 | 1, 2, 4, 5, 10, 20, 23, 46, 92, 115, 230, 460 | 12 | 1008 | 548 | abundant, composite |
| n | Divisors | d(n) | σ(n) | s(n) | Notes |
| 461 | 1, 461 | 2 | 462 | 1 | deficient, prime |
| 462 | 1, 2, 3, 6, 7, 11, 14, 21, 22, 33, 42, 66, 77, 154, 231, 462 | 16 | 1152 | 690 | abundant, composite |
| 463 | 1, 463 | 2 | 464 | 1 | deficient, prime |
| 464 | 1, 2, 4, 8, 16, 29, 58, 116, 232, 464 | 10 | 930 | 466 | abundant, composite, primitive abundant |
| 465 | 1, 3, 5, 15, 31, 93, 155, 465 | 8 | 768 | 303 | deficient, composite |
| 466 | 1, 2, 233, 466 | 4 | 702 | 236 | deficient, composite |
| 467 | 1, 467 | 2 | 468 | 1 | deficient, prime |
| 468 | 1, 2, 3, 4, 6, 9, 12, 13, 18, 26, 36, 39, 52, 78, 117, 156, 234, 468 | 18 | 1274 | 806 | abundant, composite |
| 469 | 1, 7, 67, 469 | 4 | 544 | 75 | deficient, composite |
| 470 | 1, 2, 5, 10, 47, 94, 235, 470 | 8 | 864 | 394 | deficient, composite |
| 471 | 1, 3, 157, 471 | 4 | 632 | 161 | deficient, composite |
| 472 | 1, 2, 4, 8, 59, 118, 236, 472 | 8 | 900 | 428 | deficient, composite |
| 473 | 1, 11, 43, 473 | 4 | 528 | 55 | deficient, composite |
| 474 | 1, 2, 3, 6, 79, 158, 237, 474 | 8 | 960 | 486 | abundant, composite |
| 475 | 1, 5, 19, 25, 95, 475 | 6 | 620 | 145 | deficient, composite |
| 476 | 1, 2, 4, 7, 14, 17, 28, 34, 68, 119, 238, 476 | 12 | 1008 | 532 | abundant, composite |
| 477 | 1, 3, 9, 53, 159, 477 | 6 | 702 | 225 | deficient, composite |
| 478 | 1, 2, 239, 478 | 4 | 720 | 242 | deficient, composite |
| 479 | 1, 479 | 2 | 480 | 1 | deficient, prime |
| 480 | 1, 2, 3, 4, 5, 6, 8, 10, 12, 15, 16, 20, 24, 30, 32, 40, 48, 60, 80, 96, 120, 160, 240, 480 | 24 | 1512 | 1032 | abundant, highly abundant, composite |
| n | Divisors | d(n) | σ(n) | s(n) | Notes |
| 481 | 1, 13, 37, 481 | 4 | 532 | 51 | deficient, composite |
| 482 | 1, 2, 241, 482 | 4 | 726 | 244 | deficient, composite |
| 483 | 1, 3, 7, 21, 23, 69, 161, 483 | 8 | 768 | 285 | deficient, composite |
| 484 | 1, 2, 4, 11, 22, 44, 121, 242, 484 | 9 | 931 | 447 | deficient, composite |
| 485 | 1, 5, 97, 485 | 4 | 588 | 103 | deficient, composite |
| 486 | 1, 2, 3, 6, 9, 18, 27, 54, 81, 162, 243, 486 | 12 | 1092 | 606 | abundant, composite |
| 487 | 1, 487 | 2 | 488 | 1 | deficient, prime |
| 488 | 1, 2, 4, 8, 61, 122, 244, 488 | 8 | 930 | 442 | deficient, composite |
| 489 | 1, 3, 163, 489 | 4 | 656 | 167 | deficient, composite |
| 490 | 1, 2, 5, 7, 10, 14, 35, 49, 70, 98, 245, 490 | 12 | 1026 | 536 | abundant, composite |
| 491 | 1, 491 | 2 | 492 | 1 | deficient, prime |
| 492 | 1, 2, 3, 4, 6, 12, 41, 82, 123, 164, 246, 492 | 12 | 1176 | 684 | abundant, composite |
| 493 | 1, 17, 29, 493 | 4 | 540 | 47 | deficient, composite |
| 494 | 1, 2, 13, 19, 26, 38, 247, 494 | 8 | 840 | 346 | deficient, composite |
| 495 | 1, 3, 5, 9, 11, 15, 33, 45, 55, 99, 165, 495 | 12 | 936 | 441 | deficient, composite |
| 496 | 1, 2, 4, 8, 16, 31, 62, 124, 248, 496 | 10 | 992 | 496 | perfect, composite |
| 497 | 1, 7, 71, 497 | 4 | 576 | 79 | deficient, composite |
| 498 | 1, 2, 3, 6, 83, 166, 249, 498 | 8 | 1008 | 510 | abundant, composite |
| 499 | 1, 499 | 2 | 500 | 1 | deficient, prime |
| 500 | 1, 2, 4, 5, 10, 20, 25, 50, 100, 125, 250, 500 | 12 | 1092 | 592 | abundant, composite |

== 501 to 600 ==
| n | Divisors | d(n) | σ(n) | s(n) | Notes |
|---|---|---|---|---|---|
| 501 | 1, 3, 167, 501 | 4 | 672 | 171 | deficient, composite |
| 502 | 1, 2, 251, 502 | 4 | 756 | 254 | deficient, composite |
| 503 | 1, 503 | 2 | 504 | 1 | deficient, prime |
| 504 | 1, 2, 3, 4, 6, 7, 8, 9, 12, 14, 18, 21, 24, 28, 36, 42, 56, 63, 72, 84, 126, 168, 252, 504 | 24 | 1560 | 1056 | abundant, highly abundant, composite |
| 505 | 1, 5, 101, 505 | 4 | 612 | 107 | deficient, composite |
| 506 | 1, 2, 11, 22, 23, 46, 253, 506 | 8 | 864 | 358 | deficient, composite |
| 507 | 1, 3, 13, 39, 169, 507 | 6 | 732 | 225 | deficient, composite |
| 508 | 1, 2, 4, 127, 254, 508 | 6 | 896 | 388 | deficient, composite |
| 509 | 1, 509 | 2 | 510 | 1 | deficient, prime |
| 510 | 1, 2, 3, 5, 6, 10, 15, 17, 30, 34, 51, 85, 102, 170, 255, 510 | 16 | 1296 | 786 | abundant, composite |
| 511 | 1, 7, 73, 511 | 4 | 592 | 81 | deficient, composite |
| 512 | 1, 2, 4, 8, 16, 32, 64, 128, 256, 512 | 10 | 1023 | 511 | deficient, composite |
| 513 | 1, 3, 9, 19, 27, 57, 171, 513 | 8 | 800 | 287 | deficient, composite |
| 514 | 1, 2, 257, 514 | 4 | 774 | 260 | deficient, composite |
| 515 | 1, 5, 103, 515 | 4 | 624 | 109 | deficient, composite |
| 516 | 1, 2, 3, 4, 6, 12, 43, 86, 129, 172, 258, 516 | 12 | 1232 | 716 | abundant, composite |
| 517 | 1, 11, 47, 517 | 4 | 576 | 59 | deficient, composite |
| 518 | 1, 2, 7, 14, 37, 74, 259, 518 | 8 | 912 | 394 | deficient, composite |
| 519 | 1, 3, 173, 519 | 4 | 696 | 177 | deficient, composite |
| 520 | 1, 2, 4, 5, 8, 10, 13, 20, 26, 40, 52, 65, 104, 130, 260, 520 | 16 | 1260 | 740 | abundant, composite |
| n | Divisors | d(n) | σ(n) | s(n) | Notes |
| 521 | 1, 521 | 2 | 522 | 1 | deficient, prime |
| 522 | 1, 2, 3, 6, 9, 18, 29, 58, 87, 174, 261, 522 | 12 | 1170 | 648 | abundant, composite |
| 523 | 1, 523 | 2 | 524 | 1 | deficient, prime |
| 524 | 1, 2, 4, 131, 262, 524 | 6 | 924 | 400 | deficient, composite |
| 525 | 1, 3, 5, 7, 15, 21, 25, 35, 75, 105, 175, 525 | 12 | 992 | 467 | deficient, composite |
| 526 | 1, 2, 263, 526 | 4 | 792 | 266 | deficient, composite |
| 527 | 1, 17, 31, 527 | 4 | 576 | 49 | deficient, composite |
| 528 | 1, 2, 3, 4, 6, 8, 11, 12, 16, 22, 24, 33, 44, 48, 66, 88, 132, 176, 264, 528 | 20 | 1488 | 960 | abundant, composite |
| 529 | 1, 23, 529 | 3 | 553 | 24 | deficient, composite |
| 530 | 1, 2, 5, 10, 53, 106, 265, 530 | 8 | 972 | 442 | deficient, composite |
| 531 | 1, 3, 9, 59, 177, 531 | 6 | 780 | 249 | deficient, composite |
| 532 | 1, 2, 4, 7, 14, 19, 28, 38, 76, 133, 266, 532 | 12 | 1120 | 588 | abundant, composite |
| 533 | 1, 13, 41, 533 | 4 | 588 | 55 | deficient, composite |
| 534 | 1, 2, 3, 6, 89, 178, 267, 534 | 8 | 1080 | 546 | abundant, composite |
| 535 | 1, 5, 107, 535 | 4 | 648 | 113 | deficient, composite |
| 536 | 1, 2, 4, 8, 67, 134, 268, 536 | 8 | 1020 | 484 | deficient, composite |
| 537 | 1, 3, 179, 537 | 4 | 720 | 183 | deficient, composite |
| 538 | 1, 2, 269, 538 | 4 | 810 | 272 | deficient, composite |
| 539 | 1, 7, 11, 49, 77, 539 | 6 | 684 | 145 | deficient, composite |
| 540 | 1, 2, 3, 4, 5, 6, 9, 10, 12, 15, 18, 20, 27, 30, 36, 45, 54, 60, 90, 108, 135, 180, 270, 540 | 24 | 1680 | 1140 | abundant, highly abundant, composite |
| n | Divisors | d(n) | σ(n) | s(n) | Notes |
| 541 | 1, 541 | 2 | 542 | 1 | deficient, prime |
| 542 | 1, 2, 271, 542 | 4 | 816 | 274 | deficient, composite |
| 543 | 1, 3, 181, 543 | 4 | 728 | 185 | deficient, composite |
| 544 | 1, 2, 4, 8, 16, 17, 32, 34, 68, 136, 272, 544 | 12 | 1134 | 590 | abundant, composite |
| 545 | 1, 5, 109, 545 | 4 | 660 | 115 | deficient, composite |
| 546 | 1, 2, 3, 6, 7, 13, 14, 21, 26, 39, 42, 78, 91, 182, 273, 546 | 16 | 1344 | 798 | abundant, composite |
| 547 | 1, 547 | 2 | 548 | 1 | deficient, prime |
| 548 | 1, 2, 4, 137, 274, 548 | 6 | 966 | 418 | deficient, composite |
| 549 | 1, 3, 9, 61, 183, 549 | 6 | 806 | 257 | deficient, composite |
| 550 | 1, 2, 5, 10, 11, 22, 25, 50, 55, 110, 275, 550 | 12 | 1116 | 566 | abundant, composite, primitive abundant |
| 551 | 1, 19, 29, 551 | 4 | 600 | 49 | deficient, composite |
| 552 | 1, 2, 3, 4, 6, 8, 12, 23, 24, 46, 69, 92, 138, 184, 276, 552 | 16 | 1440 | 888 | abundant, composite |
| 553 | 1, 7, 79, 553 | 4 | 640 | 87 | deficient, composite |
| 554 | 1, 2, 277, 554 | 4 | 834 | 280 | deficient, composite |
| 555 | 1, 3, 5, 15, 37, 111, 185, 555 | 8 | 912 | 357 | deficient, composite |
| 556 | 1, 2, 4, 139, 278, 556 | 6 | 980 | 424 | deficient, composite |
| 557 | 1, 557 | 2 | 558 | 1 | deficient, prime |
| 558 | 1, 2, 3, 6, 9, 18, 31, 62, 93, 186, 279, 558 | 12 | 1248 | 690 | abundant, composite |
| 559 | 1, 13, 43, 559 | 4 | 616 | 57 | deficient, composite |
| 560 | 1, 2, 4, 5, 7, 8, 10, 14, 16, 20, 28, 35, 40, 56, 70, 80, 112, 140, 280, 560 | 20 | 1488 | 928 | abundant, composite |
| n | Divisors | d(n) | σ(n) | s(n) | Notes |
| 561 | 1, 3, 11, 17, 33, 51, 187, 561 | 8 | 864 | 303 | deficient, composite |
| 562 | 1, 2, 281, 562 | 4 | 846 | 284 | deficient, composite |
| 563 | 1, 563 | 2 | 564 | 1 | deficient, prime |
| 564 | 1, 2, 3, 4, 6, 12, 47, 94, 141, 188, 282, 564 | 12 | 1344 | 780 | abundant, composite |
| 565 | 1, 5, 113, 565 | 4 | 684 | 119 | deficient, composite |
| 566 | 1, 2, 283, 566 | 4 | 852 | 286 | deficient, composite |
| 567 | 1, 3, 7, 9, 21, 27, 63, 81, 189, 567 | 10 | 968 | 401 | deficient, composite |
| 568 | 1, 2, 4, 8, 71, 142, 284, 568 | 8 | 1080 | 512 | deficient, composite |
| 569 | 1, 569 | 2 | 570 | 1 | deficient, prime |
| 570 | 1, 2, 3, 5, 6, 10, 15, 19, 30, 38, 57, 95, 114, 190, 285, 570 | 16 | 1440 | 870 | abundant, composite |
| 571 | 1, 571 | 2 | 572 | 1 | deficient, prime |
| 572 | 1, 2, 4, 11, 13, 22, 26, 44, 52, 143, 286, 572 | 12 | 1176 | 604 | abundant, composite, primitive abundant |
| 573 | 1, 3, 191, 573 | 4 | 768 | 195 | deficient, composite |
| 574 | 1, 2, 7, 14, 41, 82, 287, 574 | 8 | 1008 | 434 | deficient, composite |
| 575 | 1, 5, 23, 25, 115, 575 | 6 | 744 | 169 | deficient, composite |
| 576 | 1, 2, 3, 4, 6, 8, 9, 12, 16, 18, 24, 32, 36, 48, 64, 72, 96, 144, 192, 288, 576 | 21 | 1651 | 1075 | abundant, composite |
| 577 | 1, 577 | 2 | 578 | 1 | deficient, prime |
| 578 | 1, 2, 17, 34, 289, 578 | 6 | 921 | 343 | deficient, composite |
| 579 | 1, 3, 193, 579 | 4 | 776 | 197 | deficient, composite |
| 580 | 1, 2, 4, 5, 10, 20, 29, 58, 116, 145, 290, 580 | 12 | 1260 | 680 | abundant, composite |
| n | Divisors | d(n) | σ(n) | s(n) | Notes |
| 581 | 1, 7, 83, 581 | 4 | 672 | 91 | deficient, composite |
| 582 | 1, 2, 3, 6, 97, 194, 291, 582 | 8 | 1176 | 594 | abundant, composite |
| 583 | 1, 11, 53, 583 | 4 | 648 | 65 | deficient, composite |
| 584 | 1, 2, 4, 8, 73, 146, 292, 584 | 8 | 1110 | 526 | deficient, composite |
| 585 | 1, 3, 5, 9, 13, 15, 39, 45, 65, 117, 195, 585 | 12 | 1092 | 507 | deficient, composite |
| 586 | 1, 2, 293, 586 | 4 | 882 | 296 | deficient, composite |
| 587 | 1, 587 | 2 | 588 | 1 | deficient, prime |
| 588 | 1, 2, 3, 4, 6, 7, 12, 14, 21, 28, 42, 49, 84, 98, 147, 196, 294, 588 | 18 | 1596 | 1008 | abundant, composite |
| 589 | 1, 19, 31, 589 | 4 | 640 | 51 | deficient, composite |
| 590 | 1, 2, 5, 10, 59, 118, 295, 590 | 8 | 1080 | 490 | deficient, composite |
| 591 | 1, 3, 197, 591 | 4 | 792 | 201 | deficient, composite |
| 592 | 1, 2, 4, 8, 16, 37, 74, 148, 296, 592 | 10 | 1178 | 586 | deficient, composite |
| 593 | 1, 593 | 2 | 594 | 1 | deficient, prime |
| 594 | 1, 2, 3, 6, 9, 11, 18, 22, 27, 33, 54, 66, 99, 198, 297, 594 | 16 | 1440 | 846 | abundant, composite |
| 595 | 1, 5, 7, 17, 35, 85, 119, 595 | 8 | 864 | 269 | deficient, composite |
| 596 | 1, 2, 4, 149, 298, 596 | 6 | 1050 | 454 | deficient, composite |
| 597 | 1, 3, 199, 597 | 4 | 800 | 203 | deficient, composite |
| 598 | 1, 2, 13, 23, 26, 46, 299, 598 | 8 | 1008 | 410 | deficient, composite |
| 599 | 1, 599 | 2 | 600 | 1 | deficient, prime |
| 600 | 1, 2, 3, 4, 5, 6, 8, 10, 12, 15, 20, 24, 25, 30, 40, 50, 60, 75, 100, 120, 150, 200, 300, 600 | 24 | 1860 | 1260 | abundant, highly abundant, composite |

== 601 to 700 ==
| n | Divisors | d(n) | σ(n) | s(n) | Notes |
|---|---|---|---|---|---|
| 601 | 1, 601 | 2 | 602 | 1 | deficient, prime |
| 602 | 1, 2, 7, 14, 43, 86, 301, 602 | 8 | 1056 | 454 | deficient, composite |
| 603 | 1, 3, 9, 67, 201, 603 | 6 | 884 | 281 | deficient, composite |
| 604 | 1, 2, 4, 151, 302, 604 | 6 | 1064 | 460 | deficient, composite |
| 605 | 1, 5, 11, 55, 121, 605 | 6 | 798 | 193 | deficient, composite |
| 606 | 1, 2, 3, 6, 101, 202, 303, 606 | 8 | 1224 | 618 | abundant, composite |
| 607 | 1, 607 | 2 | 608 | 1 | deficient, prime |
| 608 | 1, 2, 4, 8, 16, 19, 32, 38, 76, 152, 304, 608 | 12 | 1260 | 652 | abundant, composite |
| 609 | 1, 3, 7, 21, 29, 87, 203, 609 | 8 | 960 | 351 | deficient, composite |
| 610 | 1, 2, 5, 10, 61, 122, 305, 610 | 8 | 1116 | 506 | deficient, composite |
| 611 | 1, 13, 47, 611 | 4 | 672 | 61 | deficient, composite |
| 612 | 1, 2, 3, 4, 6, 9, 12, 17, 18, 34, 36, 51, 68, 102, 153, 204, 306, 612 | 18 | 1638 | 1026 | abundant, composite |
| 613 | 1, 613 | 2 | 614 | 1 | deficient, prime |
| 614 | 1, 2, 307, 614 | 4 | 924 | 310 | deficient, composite |
| 615 | 1, 3, 5, 15, 41, 123, 205, 615 | 8 | 1008 | 393 | deficient, composite |
| 616 | 1, 2, 4, 7, 8, 11, 14, 22, 28, 44, 56, 77, 88, 154, 308, 616 | 16 | 1440 | 824 | abundant, composite |
| 617 | 1, 617 | 2 | 618 | 1 | deficient, prime |
| 618 | 1, 2, 3, 6, 103, 206, 309, 618 | 8 | 1248 | 630 | abundant, composite |
| 619 | 1, 619 | 2 | 620 | 1 | deficient, prime |
| 620 | 1, 2, 4, 5, 10, 20, 31, 62, 124, 155, 310, 620 | 12 | 1344 | 724 | abundant, composite |
| n | Divisors | d(n) | σ(n) | s(n) | Notes |
| 621 | 1, 3, 9, 23, 27, 69, 207, 621 | 8 | 960 | 339 | deficient, composite |
| 622 | 1, 2, 311, 622 | 4 | 936 | 314 | deficient, composite |
| 623 | 1, 7, 89, 623 | 4 | 720 | 97 | deficient, composite |
| 624 | 1, 2, 3, 4, 6, 8, 12, 13, 16, 24, 26, 39, 48, 52, 78, 104, 156, 208, 312, 624 | 20 | 1736 | 1112 | abundant, composite |
| 625 | 1, 5, 25, 125, 625 | 5 | 781 | 156 | deficient, composite |
| 626 | 1, 2, 313, 626 | 4 | 942 | 316 | deficient, composite |
| 627 | 1, 3, 11, 19, 33, 57, 209, 627 | 8 | 960 | 333 | deficient, composite |
| 628 | 1, 2, 4, 157, 314, 628 | 6 | 1106 | 478 | deficient, composite |
| 629 | 1, 17, 37, 629 | 4 | 684 | 55 | deficient, composite |
| 630 | 1, 2, 3, 5, 6, 7, 9, 10, 14, 15, 18, 21, 30, 35, 42, 45, 63, 70, 90, 105, 126, 210, 315, 630 | 24 | 1872 | 1242 | abundant, highly abundant, composite |
| 631 | 1, 631 | 2 | 632 | 1 | deficient, prime |
| 632 | 1, 2, 4, 8, 79, 158, 316, 632 | 8 | 1200 | 568 | deficient, composite |
| 633 | 1, 3, 211, 633 | 4 | 848 | 215 | deficient, composite |
| 634 | 1, 2, 317, 634 | 4 | 954 | 320 | deficient, composite |
| 635 | 1, 5, 127, 635 | 4 | 768 | 133 | deficient, composite |
| 636 | 1, 2, 3, 4, 6, 12, 53, 106, 159, 212, 318, 636 | 12 | 1512 | 876 | abundant, composite |
| 637 | 1, 7, 13, 49, 91, 637 | 6 | 798 | 161 | deficient, composite |
| 638 | 1, 2, 11, 22, 29, 58, 319, 638 | 8 | 1080 | 442 | deficient, composite |
| 639 | 1, 3, 9, 71, 213, 639 | 6 | 936 | 297 | deficient, composite |
| 640 | 1, 2, 4, 5, 8, 10, 16, 20, 32, 40, 64, 80, 128, 160, 320, 640 | 16 | 1530 | 890 | abundant, composite |
| n | Divisors | d(n) | σ(n) | s(n) | Notes |
| 641 | 1, 641 | 2 | 642 | 1 | deficient, prime |
| 642 | 1, 2, 3, 6, 107, 214, 321, 642 | 8 | 1296 | 654 | abundant, composite |
| 643 | 1, 643 | 2 | 644 | 1 | deficient, prime |
| 644 | 1, 2, 4, 7, 14, 23, 28, 46, 92, 161, 322, 644 | 12 | 1344 | 700 | abundant, composite |
| 645 | 1, 3, 5, 15, 43, 129, 215, 645 | 8 | 1056 | 411 | deficient, composite |
| 646 | 1, 2, 17, 19, 34, 38, 323, 646 | 8 | 1080 | 434 | deficient, composite |
| 647 | 1, 647 | 2 | 648 | 1 | deficient, prime |
| 648 | 1, 2, 3, 4, 6, 8, 9, 12, 18, 24, 27, 36, 54, 72, 81, 108, 162, 216, 324, 648 | 20 | 1815 | 1167 | abundant, composite |
| 649 | 1, 11, 59, 649 | 4 | 720 | 71 | deficient, composite |
| 650 | 1, 2, 5, 10, 13, 25, 26, 50, 65, 130, 325, 650 | 12 | 1302 | 652 | abundant, composite, primitive abundant |
| 651 | 1, 3, 7, 21, 31, 93, 217, 651 | 8 | 1024 | 373 | deficient, composite |
| 652 | 1, 2, 4, 163, 326, 652 | 6 | 1148 | 496 | deficient, composite |
| 653 | 1, 653 | 2 | 654 | 1 | deficient, prime |
| 654 | 1, 2, 3, 6, 109, 218, 327, 654 | 8 | 1320 | 666 | abundant, composite |
| 655 | 1, 5, 131, 655 | 4 | 792 | 137 | deficient, composite |
| 656 | 1, 2, 4, 8, 16, 41, 82, 164, 328, 656 | 10 | 1302 | 646 | deficient, composite |
| 657 | 1, 3, 9, 73, 219, 657 | 6 | 962 | 305 | deficient, composite |
| 658 | 1, 2, 7, 14, 47, 94, 329, 658 | 8 | 1152 | 494 | deficient, composite |
| 659 | 1, 659 | 2 | 660 | 1 | deficient, prime |
| 660 | 1, 2, 3, 4, 5, 6, 10, 11, 12, 15, 20, 22, 30, 33, 44, 55, 60, 66, 110, 132, 165, 220, 330, 660 | 24 | 2016 | 1356 | abundant, highly abundant, composite |
| n | Divisors | d(n) | σ(n) | s(n) | Notes |
| 661 | 1, 661 | 2 | 662 | 1 | deficient, prime |
| 662 | 1, 2, 331, 662 | 4 | 996 | 334 | deficient, composite |
| 663 | 1, 3, 13, 17, 39, 51, 221, 663 | 8 | 1008 | 345 | deficient, composite |
| 664 | 1, 2, 4, 8, 83, 166, 332, 664 | 8 | 1260 | 596 | deficient, composite |
| 665 | 1, 5, 7, 19, 35, 95, 133, 665 | 8 | 960 | 295 | deficient, composite |
| 666 | 1, 2, 3, 6, 9, 18, 37, 74, 111, 222, 333, 666 | 12 | 1482 | 816 | abundant, composite |
| 667 | 1, 23, 29, 667 | 4 | 720 | 53 | deficient, composite |
| 668 | 1, 2, 4, 167, 334, 668 | 6 | 1176 | 508 | deficient, composite |
| 669 | 1, 3, 223, 669 | 4 | 896 | 227 | deficient, composite |
| 670 | 1, 2, 5, 10, 67, 134, 335, 670 | 8 | 1224 | 554 | deficient, composite |
| 671 | 1, 11, 61, 671 | 4 | 744 | 73 | deficient, composite |
| 672 | 1, 2, 3, 4, 6, 7, 8, 12, 14, 16, 21, 24, 28, 32, 42, 48, 56, 84, 96, 112, 168, 224, 336, 672 | 24 | 2016 | 1344 | abundant, composite |
| 673 | 1, 673 | 2 | 674 | 1 | deficient, prime |
| 674 | 1, 2, 337, 674 | 4 | 1014 | 340 | deficient, composite |
| 675 | 1, 3, 5, 9, 15, 25, 27, 45, 75, 135, 225, 675 | 12 | 1240 | 565 | deficient, composite |
| 676 | 1, 2, 4, 13, 26, 52, 169, 338, 676 | 9 | 1281 | 605 | deficient, composite |
| 677 | 1, 677 | 2 | 678 | 1 | deficient, prime |
| 678 | 1, 2, 3, 6, 113, 226, 339, 678 | 8 | 1368 | 690 | abundant, composite |
| 679 | 1, 7, 97, 679 | 4 | 784 | 105 | deficient, composite |
| 680 | 1, 2, 4, 5, 8, 10, 17, 20, 34, 40, 68, 85, 136, 170, 340, 680 | 16 | 1620 | 940 | abundant, composite |
| n | Divisors | d(n) | σ(n) | s(n) | Notes |
| 681 | 1, 3, 227, 681 | 4 | 912 | 231 | deficient, composite |
| 682 | 1, 2, 11, 22, 31, 62, 341, 682 | 8 | 1152 | 470 | deficient, composite |
| 683 | 1, 683 | 2 | 684 | 1 | deficient, prime |
| 684 | 1, 2, 3, 4, 6, 9, 12, 18, 19, 36, 38, 57, 76, 114, 171, 228, 342, 684 | 18 | 1820 | 1136 | abundant, composite |
| 685 | 1, 5, 137, 685 | 4 | 828 | 143 | deficient, composite |
| 686 | 1, 2, 7, 14, 49, 98, 343, 686 | 8 | 1200 | 514 | deficient, composite |
| 687 | 1, 3, 229, 687 | 4 | 920 | 233 | deficient, composite |
| 688 | 1, 2, 4, 8, 16, 43, 86, 172, 344, 688 | 10 | 1364 | 676 | deficient, composite |
| 689 | 1, 13, 53, 689 | 4 | 756 | 67 | deficient, composite |
| 690 | 1, 2, 3, 5, 6, 10, 15, 23, 30, 46, 69, 115, 138, 230, 345, 690 | 16 | 1728 | 1038 | abundant, composite |
| 691 | 1, 691 | 2 | 692 | 1 | deficient, prime |
| 692 | 1, 2, 4, 173, 346, 692 | 6 | 1218 | 526 | deficient, composite |
| 693 | 1, 3, 7, 9, 11, 21, 33, 63, 77, 99, 231, 693 | 12 | 1248 | 555 | deficient, composite |
| 694 | 1, 2, 347, 694 | 4 | 1044 | 350 | deficient, composite |
| 695 | 1, 5, 139, 695 | 4 | 840 | 145 | deficient, composite |
| 696 | 1, 2, 3, 4, 6, 8, 12, 24, 29, 58, 87, 116, 174, 232, 348, 696 | 16 | 1800 | 1104 | abundant, composite |
| 697 | 1, 17, 41, 697 | 4 | 756 | 59 | deficient, composite |
| 698 | 1, 2, 349, 698 | 4 | 1050 | 352 | deficient, composite |
| 699 | 1, 3, 233, 699 | 4 | 936 | 237 | deficient, composite |
| 700 | 1, 2, 4, 5, 7, 10, 14, 20, 25, 28, 35, 50, 70, 100, 140, 175, 350, 700 | 18 | 1736 | 1036 | abundant, composite |

== 701 to 800 ==
| n | Divisors | d(n) | σ(n) | s(n) | Notes |
|---|---|---|---|---|---|
| 701 | 1, 701 | 2 | 702 | 1 | deficient, prime |
| 702 | 1, 2, 3, 6, 9, 13, 18, 26, 27, 39, 54, 78, 117, 234, 351, 702 | 16 | 1680 | 978 | abundant, composite |
| 703 | 1, 19, 37, 703 | 4 | 760 | 57 | deficient, composite |
| 704 | 1, 2, 4, 8, 11, 16, 22, 32, 44, 64, 88, 176, 352, 704 | 14 | 1524 | 820 | abundant, composite |
| 705 | 1, 3, 5, 15, 47, 141, 235, 705 | 8 | 1152 | 447 | deficient, composite |
| 706 | 1, 2, 353, 706 | 4 | 1062 | 356 | deficient, composite |
| 707 | 1, 7, 101, 707 | 4 | 816 | 109 | deficient, composite |
| 708 | 1, 2, 3, 4, 6, 12, 59, 118, 177, 236, 354, 708 | 12 | 1680 | 972 | abundant, composite |
| 709 | 1, 709 | 2 | 710 | 1 | deficient, prime |
| 710 | 1, 2, 5, 10, 71, 142, 355, 710 | 8 | 1296 | 586 | deficient, composite |
| 711 | 1, 3, 9, 79, 237, 711 | 6 | 1040 | 329 | deficient, composite |
| 712 | 1, 2, 4, 8, 89, 178, 356, 712 | 8 | 1350 | 638 | deficient, composite |
| 713 | 1, 23, 31, 713 | 4 | 768 | 55 | deficient, composite |
| 714 | 1, 2, 3, 6, 7, 14, 17, 21, 34, 42, 51, 102, 119, 238, 357, 714 | 16 | 1728 | 1014 | abundant, composite |
| 715 | 1, 5, 11, 13, 55, 65, 143, 715 | 8 | 1008 | 293 | deficient, composite |
| 716 | 1, 2, 4, 179, 358, 716 | 6 | 1260 | 544 | deficient, composite |
| 717 | 1, 3, 239, 717 | 4 | 960 | 243 | deficient, composite |
| 718 | 1, 2, 359, 718 | 4 | 1080 | 362 | deficient, composite |
| 719 | 1, 719 | 2 | 720 | 1 | deficient, prime |
| 720 | 1, 2, 3, 4, 5, 6, 8, 9, 10, 12, 15, 16, 18, 20, 24, 30, 36, 40, 45, 48, 60, 72, 80, 90, 120, 144, 180, 240, 360, 720 | 30 | 2418 | 1698 | abundant, highly abundant, composite, highly composite |
| n | Divisors | d(n) | σ(n) | s(n) | Notes |
| 721 | 1, 7, 103, 721 | 4 | 832 | 111 | deficient, composite |
| 722 | 1, 2, 19, 38, 361, 722 | 6 | 1143 | 421 | deficient, composite |
| 723 | 1, 3, 241, 723 | 4 | 968 | 245 | deficient, composite |
| 724 | 1, 2, 4, 181, 362, 724 | 6 | 1274 | 550 | deficient, composite |
| 725 | 1, 5, 25, 29, 145, 725 | 6 | 930 | 205 | deficient, composite |
| 726 | 1, 2, 3, 6, 11, 22, 33, 66, 121, 242, 363, 726 | 12 | 1596 | 870 | abundant, composite |
| 727 | 1, 727 | 2 | 728 | 1 | deficient, prime |
| 728 | 1, 2, 4, 7, 8, 13, 14, 26, 28, 52, 56, 91, 104, 182, 364, 728 | 16 | 1680 | 952 | abundant, composite |
| 729 | 1, 3, 9, 27, 81, 243, 729 | 7 | 1093 | 364 | deficient, composite |
| 730 | 1, 2, 5, 10, 73, 146, 365, 730 | 8 | 1332 | 602 | deficient, composite |
| 731 | 1, 17, 43, 731 | 4 | 792 | 61 | deficient, composite |
| 732 | 1, 2, 3, 4, 6, 12, 61, 122, 183, 244, 366, 732 | 12 | 1736 | 1004 | abundant, composite |
| 733 | 1, 733 | 2 | 734 | 1 | deficient, prime |
| 734 | 1, 2, 367, 734 | 4 | 1104 | 370 | deficient, composite |
| 735 | 1, 3, 5, 7, 15, 21, 35, 49, 105, 147, 245, 735 | 12 | 1368 | 633 | deficient, composite |
| 736 | 1, 2, 4, 8, 16, 23, 32, 46, 92, 184, 368, 736 | 12 | 1512 | 776 | abundant, composite |
| 737 | 1, 11, 67, 737 | 4 | 816 | 79 | deficient, composite |
| 738 | 1, 2, 3, 6, 9, 18, 41, 82, 123, 246, 369, 738 | 12 | 1638 | 900 | abundant, composite |
| 739 | 1, 739 | 2 | 740 | 1 | deficient, prime |
| 740 | 1, 2, 4, 5, 10, 20, 37, 74, 148, 185, 370, 740 | 12 | 1596 | 856 | abundant, composite |
| n | Divisors | d(n) | σ(n) | s(n) | Notes |
| 741 | 1, 3, 13, 19, 39, 57, 247, 741 | 8 | 1120 | 379 | deficient, composite |
| 742 | 1, 2, 7, 14, 53, 106, 371, 742 | 8 | 1296 | 554 | deficient, composite |
| 743 | 1, 743 | 2 | 744 | 1 | deficient, prime |
| 744 | 1, 2, 3, 4, 6, 8, 12, 24, 31, 62, 93, 124, 186, 248, 372, 744 | 16 | 1920 | 1176 | abundant, composite |
| 745 | 1, 5, 149, 745 | 4 | 900 | 155 | deficient, composite |
| 746 | 1, 2, 373, 746 | 4 | 1122 | 376 | deficient, composite |
| 747 | 1, 3, 9, 83, 249, 747 | 6 | 1092 | 345 | deficient, composite |
| 748 | 1, 2, 4, 11, 17, 22, 34, 44, 68, 187, 374, 748 | 12 | 1512 | 764 | abundant, composite, primitive abundant |
| 749 | 1, 7, 107, 749 | 4 | 864 | 115 | deficient, composite |
| 750 | 1, 2, 3, 5, 6, 10, 15, 25, 30, 50, 75, 125, 150, 250, 375, 750 | 16 | 1872 | 1122 | abundant, composite |
| 751 | 1, 751 | 2 | 752 | 1 | deficient, prime |
| 752 | 1, 2, 4, 8, 16, 47, 94, 188, 376, 752 | 10 | 1488 | 736 | deficient, composite |
| 753 | 1, 3, 251, 753 | 4 | 1008 | 255 | deficient, composite |
| 754 | 1, 2, 13, 26, 29, 58, 377, 754 | 8 | 1260 | 506 | deficient, composite |
| 755 | 1, 5, 151, 755 | 4 | 912 | 157 | deficient, composite |
| 756 | 1, 2, 3, 4, 6, 7, 9, 12, 14, 18, 21, 27, 28, 36, 42, 54, 63, 84, 108, 126, 189, 252, 378, 756 | 24 | 2240 | 1484 | abundant, composite |
| 757 | 1, 757 | 2 | 758 | 1 | deficient, prime |
| 758 | 1, 2, 379, 758 | 4 | 1140 | 382 | deficient, composite |
| 759 | 1, 3, 11, 23, 33, 69, 253, 759 | 8 | 1152 | 393 | deficient, composite |
| 760 | 1, 2, 4, 5, 8, 10, 19, 20, 38, 40, 76, 95, 152, 190, 380, 760 | 16 | 1800 | 1040 | abundant, composite |
| n | Divisors | d(n) | σ(n) | s(n) | Notes |
| 761 | 1, 761 | 2 | 762 | 1 | deficient, prime |
| 762 | 1, 2, 3, 6, 127, 254, 381, 762 | 8 | 1536 | 774 | abundant, composite |
| 763 | 1, 7, 109, 763 | 4 | 880 | 117 | deficient, composite |
| 764 | 1, 2, 4, 191, 382, 764 | 6 | 1344 | 580 | deficient, composite |
| 765 | 1, 3, 5, 9, 15, 17, 45, 51, 85, 153, 255, 765 | 12 | 1404 | 639 | deficient, composite |
| 766 | 1, 2, 383, 766 | 4 | 1152 | 386 | deficient, composite |
| 767 | 1, 13, 59, 767 | 4 | 840 | 73 | deficient, composite |
| 768 | 1, 2, 3, 4, 6, 8, 12, 16, 24, 32, 48, 64, 96, 128, 192, 256, 384, 768 | 18 | 2044 | 1276 | abundant, composite |
| 769 | 1, 769 | 2 | 770 | 1 | deficient, prime |
| 770 | 1, 2, 5, 7, 10, 11, 14, 22, 35, 55, 70, 77, 110, 154, 385, 770 | 16 | 1728 | 958 | abundant, composite |
| 771 | 1, 3, 257, 771 | 4 | 1032 | 261 | deficient, composite |
| 772 | 1, 2, 4, 193, 386, 772 | 6 | 1358 | 586 | deficient, composite |
| 773 | 1, 773 | 2 | 774 | 1 | deficient, prime |
| 774 | 1, 2, 3, 6, 9, 18, 43, 86, 129, 258, 387, 774 | 12 | 1716 | 942 | abundant, composite |
| 775 | 1, 5, 25, 31, 155, 775 | 6 | 992 | 217 | deficient, composite |
| 776 | 1, 2, 4, 8, 97, 194, 388, 776 | 8 | 1470 | 694 | deficient, composite |
| 777 | 1, 3, 7, 21, 37, 111, 259, 777 | 8 | 1216 | 439 | deficient, composite |
| 778 | 1, 2, 389, 778 | 4 | 1170 | 392 | deficient, composite |
| 779 | 1, 19, 41, 779 | 4 | 840 | 61 | deficient, composite |
| 780 | 1, 2, 3, 4, 5, 6, 10, 12, 13, 15, 20, 26, 30, 39, 52, 60, 65, 78, 130, 156, 195, 260, 390, 780 | 24 | 2352 | 1572 | abundant, composite |
| n | Divisors | d(n) | σ(n) | s(n) | Notes |
| 781 | 1, 11, 71, 781 | 4 | 864 | 83 | deficient, composite |
| 782 | 1, 2, 17, 23, 34, 46, 391, 782 | 8 | 1296 | 514 | deficient, composite |
| 783 | 1, 3, 9, 27, 29, 87, 261, 783 | 8 | 1200 | 417 | deficient, composite |
| 784 | 1, 2, 4, 7, 8, 14, 16, 28, 49, 56, 98, 112, 196, 392, 784 | 15 | 1767 | 983 | abundant, composite |
| 785 | 1, 5, 157, 785 | 4 | 948 | 163 | deficient, composite |
| 786 | 1, 2, 3, 6, 131, 262, 393, 786 | 8 | 1584 | 798 | abundant, composite |
| 787 | 1, 787 | 2 | 788 | 1 | deficient, prime |
| 788 | 1, 2, 4, 197, 394, 788 | 6 | 1386 | 598 | deficient, composite |
| 789 | 1, 3, 263, 789 | 4 | 1056 | 267 | deficient, composite |
| 790 | 1, 2, 5, 10, 79, 158, 395, 790 | 8 | 1440 | 650 | deficient, composite |
| 791 | 1, 7, 113, 791 | 4 | 912 | 121 | deficient, composite |
| 792 | 1, 2, 3, 4, 6, 8, 9, 11, 12, 18, 22, 24, 33, 36, 44, 66, 72, 88, 99, 132, 198, 264, 396, 792 | 24 | 2340 | 1548 | abundant, composite |
| 793 | 1, 13, 61, 793 | 4 | 868 | 75 | deficient, composite |
| 794 | 1, 2, 397, 794 | 4 | 1194 | 400 | deficient, composite |
| 795 | 1, 3, 5, 15, 53, 159, 265, 795 | 8 | 1296 | 501 | deficient, composite |
| 796 | 1, 2, 4, 199, 398, 796 | 6 | 1400 | 604 | deficient, composite |
| 797 | 1, 797 | 2 | 798 | 1 | deficient, prime |
| 798 | 1, 2, 3, 6, 7, 14, 19, 21, 38, 42, 57, 114, 133, 266, 399, 798 | 16 | 1920 | 1122 | abundant, composite |
| 799 | 1, 17, 47, 799 | 4 | 864 | 65 | deficient, composite |
| 800 | 1, 2, 4, 5, 8, 10, 16, 20, 25, 32, 40, 50, 80, 100, 160, 200, 400, 800 | 18 | 1953 | 1153 | abundant, composite |

== 801 to 900 ==
| n | Divisors | d(n) | σ(n) | s(n) | Notes |
|---|---|---|---|---|---|
| 801 | 1, 3, 9, 89, 267, 801 | 6 | 1170 | 369 | deficient, composite |
| 802 | 1, 2, 401, 802 | 4 | 1206 | 404 | deficient, composite |
| 803 | 1, 11, 73, 803 | 4 | 888 | 85 | deficient, composite |
| 804 | 1, 2, 3, 4, 6, 12, 67, 134, 201, 268, 402, 804 | 12 | 1904 | 1100 | abundant, composite |
| 805 | 1, 5, 7, 23, 35, 115, 161, 805 | 8 | 1152 | 347 | deficient, composite |
| 806 | 1, 2, 13, 26, 31, 62, 403, 806 | 8 | 1344 | 538 | deficient, composite |
| 807 | 1, 3, 269, 807 | 4 | 1080 | 273 | deficient, composite |
| 808 | 1, 2, 4, 8, 101, 202, 404, 808 | 8 | 1530 | 722 | deficient, composite |
| 809 | 1, 809 | 2 | 810 | 1 | deficient, prime |
| 810 | 1, 2, 3, 5, 6, 9, 10, 15, 18, 27, 30, 45, 54, 81, 90, 135, 162, 270, 405, 810 | 20 | 2178 | 1368 | abundant, composite |
| 811 | 1, 811 | 2 | 812 | 1 | deficient, prime |
| 812 | 1, 2, 4, 7, 14, 28, 29, 58, 116, 203, 406, 812 | 12 | 1680 | 868 | abundant, composite |
| 813 | 1, 3, 271, 813 | 4 | 1088 | 275 | deficient, composite |
| 814 | 1, 2, 11, 22, 37, 74, 407, 814 | 8 | 1368 | 554 | deficient, composite |
| 815 | 1, 5, 163, 815 | 4 | 984 | 169 | deficient, composite |
| 816 | 1, 2, 3, 4, 6, 8, 12, 16, 17, 24, 34, 48, 51, 68, 102, 136, 204, 272, 408, 816 | 20 | 2232 | 1416 | abundant, composite |
| 817 | 1, 19, 43, 817 | 4 | 880 | 63 | deficient, composite |
| 818 | 1, 2, 409, 818 | 4 | 1230 | 412 | deficient, composite |
| 819 | 1, 3, 7, 9, 13, 21, 39, 63, 91, 117, 273, 819 | 12 | 1456 | 637 | deficient, composite |
| 820 | 1, 2, 4, 5, 10, 20, 41, 82, 164, 205, 410, 820 | 12 | 1764 | 944 | abundant, composite |
| n | Divisors | d(n) | σ(n) | s(n) | Notes |
| 821 | 1, 821 | 2 | 822 | 1 | deficient, prime |
| 822 | 1, 2, 3, 6, 137, 274, 411, 822 | 8 | 1656 | 834 | abundant, composite |
| 823 | 1, 823 | 2 | 824 | 1 | deficient, prime |
| 824 | 1, 2, 4, 8, 103, 206, 412, 824 | 8 | 1560 | 736 | deficient, composite |
| 825 | 1, 3, 5, 11, 15, 25, 33, 55, 75, 165, 275, 825 | 12 | 1488 | 663 | deficient, composite |
| 826 | 1, 2, 7, 14, 59, 118, 413, 826 | 8 | 1440 | 614 | deficient, composite |
| 827 | 1, 827 | 2 | 828 | 1 | deficient, prime |
| 828 | 1, 2, 3, 4, 6, 9, 12, 18, 23, 36, 46, 69, 92, 138, 207, 276, 414, 828 | 18 | 2184 | 1356 | abundant, composite |
| 829 | 1, 829 | 2 | 830 | 1 | deficient, prime |
| 830 | 1, 2, 5, 10, 83, 166, 415, 830 | 8 | 1512 | 682 | deficient, composite |
| 831 | 1, 3, 277, 831 | 4 | 1112 | 281 | deficient, composite |
| 832 | 1, 2, 4, 8, 13, 16, 26, 32, 52, 64, 104, 208, 416, 832 | 14 | 1778 | 946 | abundant, composite |
| 833 | 1, 7, 17, 49, 119, 833 | 6 | 1026 | 193 | deficient, composite |
| 834 | 1, 2, 3, 6, 139, 278, 417, 834 | 8 | 1680 | 846 | abundant, composite |
| 835 | 1, 5, 167, 835 | 4 | 1008 | 173 | deficient, composite |
| 836 | 1, 2, 4, 11, 19, 22, 38, 44, 76, 209, 418, 836 | 12 | 1680 | 844 | abundant, composite, primitive abundant, weird |
| 837 | 1, 3, 9, 27, 31, 93, 279, 837 | 8 | 1280 | 443 | deficient, composite |
| 838 | 1, 2, 419, 838 | 4 | 1260 | 422 | deficient, composite |
| 839 | 1, 839 | 2 | 840 | 1 | deficient, prime |
| 840 | 1, 2, 3, 4, 5, 6, 7, 8, 10, 12, 14, 15, 20, 21, 24, 28, 30, 35, 40, 42, 56, 60, 70, 84, 105, 120, 140, 168, 210, 280, 420, 840 | 32 | 2880 | 2040 | abundant, highly abundant, composite, highly composite |
| n | Divisors | d(n) | σ(n) | s(n) | Notes |
| 841 | 1, 29, 841 | 3 | 871 | 30 | deficient, composite |
| 842 | 1, 2, 421, 842 | 4 | 1266 | 424 | deficient, composite |
| 843 | 1, 3, 281, 843 | 4 | 1128 | 285 | deficient, composite |
| 844 | 1, 2, 4, 211, 422, 844 | 6 | 1484 | 640 | deficient, composite |
| 845 | 1, 5, 13, 65, 169, 845 | 6 | 1098 | 253 | deficient, composite |
| 846 | 1, 2, 3, 6, 9, 18, 47, 94, 141, 282, 423, 846 | 12 | 1872 | 1026 | abundant, composite |
| 847 | 1, 7, 11, 77, 121, 847 | 6 | 1064 | 217 | deficient, composite |
| 848 | 1, 2, 4, 8, 16, 53, 106, 212, 424, 848 | 10 | 1674 | 826 | deficient, composite |
| 849 | 1, 3, 283, 849 | 4 | 1136 | 287 | deficient, composite |
| 850 | 1, 2, 5, 10, 17, 25, 34, 50, 85, 170, 425, 850 | 12 | 1674 | 824 | deficient, composite |
| 851 | 1, 23, 37, 851 | 4 | 912 | 61 | deficient, composite |
| 852 | 1, 2, 3, 4, 6, 12, 71, 142, 213, 284, 426, 852 | 12 | 2016 | 1164 | abundant, composite |
| 853 | 1, 853 | 2 | 854 | 1 | deficient, prime |
| 854 | 1, 2, 7, 14, 61, 122, 427, 854 | 8 | 1488 | 634 | deficient, composite |
| 855 | 1, 3, 5, 9, 15, 19, 45, 57, 95, 171, 285, 855 | 12 | 1560 | 705 | deficient, composite |
| 856 | 1, 2, 4, 8, 107, 214, 428, 856 | 8 | 1620 | 764 | deficient, composite |
| 857 | 1, 857 | 2 | 858 | 1 | deficient, prime |
| 858 | 1, 2, 3, 6, 11, 13, 22, 26, 33, 39, 66, 78, 143, 286, 429, 858 | 16 | 2016 | 1158 | abundant, composite |
| 859 | 1, 859 | 2 | 860 | 1 | deficient, prime |
| 860 | 1, 2, 4, 5, 10, 20, 43, 86, 172, 215, 430, 860 | 12 | 1848 | 988 | abundant, composite |
| n | Divisors | d(n) | σ(n) | s(n) | Notes |
| 861 | 1, 3, 7, 21, 41, 123, 287, 861 | 8 | 1344 | 483 | deficient, composite |
| 862 | 1, 2, 431, 862 | 4 | 1296 | 434 | deficient, composite |
| 863 | 1, 863 | 2 | 864 | 1 | deficient, prime |
| 864 | 1, 2, 3, 4, 6, 8, 9, 12, 16, 18, 24, 27, 32, 36, 48, 54, 72, 96, 108, 144, 216, 288, 432, 864 | 24 | 2520 | 1656 | abundant, composite |
| 865 | 1, 5, 173, 865 | 4 | 1044 | 179 | deficient, composite |
| 866 | 1, 2, 433, 866 | 4 | 1302 | 436 | deficient, composite |
| 867 | 1, 3, 17, 51, 289, 867 | 6 | 1228 | 361 | deficient, composite |
| 868 | 1, 2, 4, 7, 14, 28, 31, 62, 124, 217, 434, 868 | 12 | 1792 | 924 | abundant, composite |
| 869 | 1, 11, 79, 869 | 4 | 960 | 91 | deficient, composite |
| 870 | 1, 2, 3, 5, 6, 10, 15, 29, 30, 58, 87, 145, 174, 290, 435, 870 | 16 | 2160 | 1290 | abundant, composite |
| 871 | 1, 13, 67, 871 | 4 | 952 | 81 | deficient, composite |
| 872 | 1, 2, 4, 8, 109, 218, 436, 872 | 8 | 1650 | 778 | deficient, composite |
| 873 | 1, 3, 9, 97, 291, 873 | 6 | 1274 | 401 | deficient, composite |
| 874 | 1, 2, 19, 23, 38, 46, 437, 874 | 8 | 1440 | 566 | deficient, composite |
| 875 | 1, 5, 7, 25, 35, 125, 175, 875 | 8 | 1248 | 373 | deficient, composite |
| 876 | 1, 2, 3, 4, 6, 12, 73, 146, 219, 292, 438, 876 | 12 | 2072 | 1196 | abundant, composite |
| 877 | 1, 877 | 2 | 878 | 1 | deficient, prime |
| 878 | 1, 2, 439, 878 | 4 | 1320 | 442 | deficient, composite |
| 879 | 1, 3, 293, 879 | 4 | 1176 | 297 | deficient, composite |
| 880 | 1, 2, 4, 5, 8, 10, 11, 16, 20, 22, 40, 44, 55, 80, 88, 110, 176, 220, 440, 880 | 20 | 2232 | 1352 | abundant, composite |
| n | Divisors | d(n) | σ(n) | s(n) | Notes |
| 881 | 1, 881 | 2 | 882 | 1 | deficient, prime |
| 882 | 1, 2, 3, 6, 7, 9, 14, 18, 21, 42, 49, 63, 98, 126, 147, 294, 441, 882 | 18 | 2223 | 1341 | abundant, composite |
| 883 | 1, 883 | 2 | 884 | 1 | deficient, prime |
| 884 | 1, 2, 4, 13, 17, 26, 34, 52, 68, 221, 442, 884 | 12 | 1764 | 880 | deficient, composite |
| 885 | 1, 3, 5, 15, 59, 177, 295, 885 | 8 | 1440 | 555 | deficient, composite |
| 886 | 1, 2, 443, 886 | 4 | 1332 | 446 | deficient, composite |
| 887 | 1, 887 | 2 | 888 | 1 | deficient, prime |
| 888 | 1, 2, 3, 4, 6, 8, 12, 24, 37, 74, 111, 148, 222, 296, 444, 888 | 16 | 2280 | 1392 | abundant, composite |
| 889 | 1, 7, 127, 889 | 4 | 1024 | 135 | deficient, composite |
| 890 | 1, 2, 5, 10, 89, 178, 445, 890 | 8 | 1620 | 730 | deficient, composite |
| 891 | 1, 3, 9, 11, 27, 33, 81, 99, 297, 891 | 10 | 1452 | 561 | deficient, composite |
| 892 | 1, 2, 4, 223, 446, 892 | 6 | 1568 | 676 | deficient, composite |
| 893 | 1, 19, 47, 893 | 4 | 960 | 67 | deficient, composite |
| 894 | 1, 2, 3, 6, 149, 298, 447, 894 | 8 | 1800 | 906 | abundant, composite |
| 895 | 1, 5, 179, 895 | 4 | 1080 | 185 | deficient, composite |
| 896 | 1, 2, 4, 7, 8, 14, 16, 28, 32, 56, 64, 112, 128, 224, 448, 896 | 16 | 2040 | 1144 | abundant, composite |
| 897 | 1, 3, 13, 23, 39, 69, 299, 897 | 8 | 1344 | 447 | deficient, composite |
| 898 | 1, 2, 449, 898 | 4 | 1350 | 452 | deficient, composite |
| 899 | 1, 29, 31, 899 | 4 | 960 | 61 | deficient, composite |
| 900 | 1, 2, 3, 4, 5, 6, 9, 10, 12, 15, 18, 20, 25, 30, 36, 45, 50, 60, 75, 90, 100, 150, 180, 225, 300, 450, 900 | 27 | 2821 | 1921 | abundant, composite |

== 901 to 1000 ==
| n | Divisors | d(n) | σ(n) | s(n) | Notes |
|---|---|---|---|---|---|
| 901 | 1, 17, 53, 901 | 4 | 972 | 71 | deficient, composite |
| 902 | 1, 2, 11, 22, 41, 82, 451, 902 | 8 | 1512 | 610 | deficient, composite |
| 903 | 1, 3, 7, 21, 43, 129, 301, 903 | 8 | 1408 | 505 | deficient, composite |
| 904 | 1, 2, 4, 8, 113, 226, 452, 904 | 8 | 1710 | 806 | deficient, composite |
| 905 | 1, 5, 181, 905 | 4 | 1092 | 187 | deficient, composite |
| 906 | 1, 2, 3, 6, 151, 302, 453, 906 | 8 | 1824 | 918 | abundant, composite |
| 907 | 1, 907 | 2 | 908 | 1 | deficient, prime |
| 908 | 1, 2, 4, 227, 454, 908 | 6 | 1596 | 688 | deficient, composite |
| 909 | 1, 3, 9, 101, 303, 909 | 6 | 1326 | 417 | deficient, composite |
| 910 | 1, 2, 5, 7, 10, 13, 14, 26, 35, 65, 70, 91, 130, 182, 455, 910 | 16 | 2016 | 1106 | abundant, composite |
| 911 | 1, 911 | 2 | 912 | 1 | deficient, prime |
| 912 | 1, 2, 3, 4, 6, 8, 12, 16, 19, 24, 38, 48, 57, 76, 114, 152, 228, 304, 456, 912 | 20 | 2480 | 1568 | abundant, composite |
| 913 | 1, 11, 83, 913 | 4 | 1008 | 95 | deficient, composite |
| 914 | 1, 2, 457, 914 | 4 | 1374 | 460 | deficient, composite |
| 915 | 1, 3, 5, 15, 61, 183, 305, 915 | 8 | 1488 | 573 | deficient, composite |
| 916 | 1, 2, 4, 229, 458, 916 | 6 | 1610 | 694 | deficient, composite |
| 917 | 1, 7, 131, 917 | 4 | 1056 | 139 | deficient, composite |
| 918 | 1, 2, 3, 6, 9, 17, 18, 27, 34, 51, 54, 102, 153, 306, 459, 918 | 16 | 2160 | 1242 | abundant, composite |
| 919 | 1, 919 | 2 | 920 | 1 | deficient, prime |
| 920 | 1, 2, 4, 5, 8, 10, 20, 23, 40, 46, 92, 115, 184, 230, 460, 920 | 16 | 2160 | 1240 | abundant, composite |
| n | Divisors | d(n) | σ(n) | s(n) | Notes |
| 921 | 1, 3, 307, 921 | 4 | 1232 | 311 | deficient, composite |
| 922 | 1, 2, 461, 922 | 4 | 1386 | 464 | deficient, composite |
| 923 | 1, 13, 71, 923 | 4 | 1008 | 85 | deficient, composite |
| 924 | 1, 2, 3, 4, 6, 7, 11, 12, 14, 21, 22, 28, 33, 42, 44, 66, 77, 84, 132, 154, 231, 308, 462, 924 | 24 | 2688 | 1764 | abundant, composite |
| 925 | 1, 5, 25, 37, 185, 925 | 6 | 1178 | 253 | deficient, composite |
| 926 | 1, 2, 463, 926 | 4 | 1392 | 466 | deficient, composite |
| 927 | 1, 3, 9, 103, 309, 927 | 6 | 1352 | 425 | deficient, composite |
| 928 | 1, 2, 4, 8, 16, 29, 32, 58, 116, 232, 464, 928 | 12 | 1890 | 962 | abundant, composite |
| 929 | 1, 929 | 2 | 930 | 1 | deficient, prime |
| 930 | 1, 2, 3, 5, 6, 10, 15, 30, 31, 62, 93, 155, 186, 310, 465, 930 | 16 | 2304 | 1374 | abundant, composite |
| 931 | 1, 7, 19, 49, 133, 931 | 6 | 1140 | 209 | deficient, composite |
| 932 | 1, 2, 4, 233, 466, 932 | 6 | 1638 | 706 | deficient, composite |
| 933 | 1, 3, 311, 933 | 4 | 1248 | 315 | deficient, composite |
| 934 | 1, 2, 467, 934 | 4 | 1404 | 470 | deficient, composite |
| 935 | 1, 5, 11, 17, 55, 85, 187, 935 | 8 | 1296 | 361 | deficient, composite |
| 936 | 1, 2, 3, 4, 6, 8, 9, 12, 13, 18, 24, 26, 36, 39, 52, 72, 78, 104, 117, 156, 234, 312, 468, 936 | 24 | 2730 | 1794 | abundant, composite |
| 937 | 1, 937 | 2 | 938 | 1 | deficient, prime |
| 938 | 1, 2, 7, 14, 67, 134, 469, 938 | 8 | 1632 | 694 | deficient, composite |
| 939 | 1, 3, 313, 939 | 4 | 1256 | 317 | deficient, composite |
| 940 | 1, 2, 4, 5, 10, 20, 47, 94, 188, 235, 470, 940 | 12 | 2016 | 1076 | abundant, composite |
| n | Divisors | d(n) | σ(n) | s(n) | Notes |
| 941 | 1, 941 | 2 | 942 | 1 | deficient, prime |
| 942 | 1, 2, 3, 6, 157, 314, 471, 942 | 8 | 1896 | 954 | abundant, composite |
| 943 | 1, 23, 41, 943 | 4 | 1008 | 65 | deficient, composite |
| 944 | 1, 2, 4, 8, 16, 59, 118, 236, 472, 944 | 10 | 1860 | 916 | deficient, composite |
| 945 | 1, 3, 5, 7, 9, 15, 21, 27, 35, 45, 63, 105, 135, 189, 315, 945 | 16 | 1920 | 975 | abundant, composite, primitive abundant |
| 946 | 1, 2, 11, 22, 43, 86, 473, 946 | 8 | 1584 | 638 | deficient, composite |
| 947 | 1, 947 | 2 | 948 | 1 | deficient, prime |
| 948 | 1, 2, 3, 4, 6, 12, 79, 158, 237, 316, 474, 948 | 12 | 2240 | 1292 | abundant, composite |
| 949 | 1, 13, 73, 949 | 4 | 1036 | 87 | deficient, composite |
| 950 | 1, 2, 5, 10, 19, 25, 38, 50, 95, 190, 475, 950 | 12 | 1860 | 910 | deficient, composite |
| 951 | 1, 3, 317, 951 | 4 | 1272 | 321 | deficient, composite |
| 952 | 1, 2, 4, 7, 8, 14, 17, 28, 34, 56, 68, 119, 136, 238, 476, 952 | 16 | 2160 | 1208 | abundant, composite |
| 953 | 1, 953 | 2 | 954 | 1 | deficient, prime |
| 954 | 1, 2, 3, 6, 9, 18, 53, 106, 159, 318, 477, 954 | 12 | 2106 | 1152 | abundant, composite |
| 955 | 1, 5, 191, 955 | 4 | 1152 | 197 | deficient, composite |
| 956 | 1, 2, 4, 239, 478, 956 | 6 | 1680 | 724 | deficient, composite |
| 957 | 1, 3, 11, 29, 33, 87, 319, 957 | 8 | 1440 | 483 | deficient, composite |
| 958 | 1, 2, 479, 958 | 4 | 1440 | 482 | deficient, composite |
| 959 | 1, 7, 137, 959 | 4 | 1104 | 145 | deficient, composite |
| 960 | 1, 2, 3, 4, 5, 6, 8, 10, 12, 15, 16, 20, 24, 30, 32, 40, 48, 60, 64, 80, 96, 120, 160, 192, 240, 320, 480, 960 | 28 | 3048 | 2088 | abundant, highly abundant, composite |
| n | Divisors | d(n) | σ(n) | s(n) | Notes |
| 961 | 1, 31, 961 | 3 | 993 | 32 | deficient, composite |
| 962 | 1, 2, 13, 26, 37, 74, 481, 962 | 8 | 1596 | 634 | deficient, composite |
| 963 | 1, 3, 9, 107, 321, 963 | 6 | 1404 | 441 | deficient, composite |
| 964 | 1, 2, 4, 241, 482, 964 | 6 | 1694 | 730 | deficient, composite |
| 965 | 1, 5, 193, 965 | 4 | 1164 | 199 | deficient, composite |
| 966 | 1, 2, 3, 6, 7, 14, 21, 23, 42, 46, 69, 138, 161, 322, 483, 966 | 16 | 2304 | 1338 | abundant, composite |
| 967 | 1, 967 | 2 | 968 | 1 | deficient, prime |
| 968 | 1, 2, 4, 8, 11, 22, 44, 88, 121, 242, 484, 968 | 12 | 1995 | 1027 | abundant, composite |
| 969 | 1, 3, 17, 19, 51, 57, 323, 969 | 8 | 1440 | 471 | deficient, composite |
| 970 | 1, 2, 5, 10, 97, 194, 485, 970 | 8 | 1764 | 794 | deficient, composite |
| 971 | 1, 971 | 2 | 972 | 1 | deficient, prime |
| 972 | 1, 2, 3, 4, 6, 9, 12, 18, 27, 36, 54, 81, 108, 162, 243, 324, 486, 972 | 18 | 2548 | 1576 | abundant, composite |
| 973 | 1, 7, 139, 973 | 4 | 1120 | 147 | deficient, composite |
| 974 | 1, 2, 487, 974 | 4 | 1464 | 490 | deficient, composite |
| 975 | 1, 3, 5, 13, 15, 25, 39, 65, 75, 195, 325, 975 | 12 | 1736 | 761 | deficient, composite |
| 976 | 1, 2, 4, 8, 16, 61, 122, 244, 488, 976 | 10 | 1922 | 946 | deficient, composite |
| 977 | 1, 977 | 2 | 978 | 1 | deficient, prime |
| 978 | 1, 2, 3, 6, 163, 326, 489, 978 | 8 | 1968 | 990 | abundant, composite |
| 979 | 1, 11, 89, 979 | 4 | 1080 | 101 | deficient, composite |
| 980 | 1, 2, 4, 5, 7, 10, 14, 20, 28, 35, 49, 70, 98, 140, 196, 245, 490, 980 | 18 | 2394 | 1414 | abundant, composite |
| n | Divisors | d(n) | σ(n) | s(n) | Notes |
| 981 | 1, 3, 9, 109, 327, 981 | 6 | 1430 | 449 | deficient, composite |
| 982 | 1, 2, 491, 982 | 4 | 1476 | 494 | deficient, composite |
| 983 | 1, 983 | 2 | 984 | 1 | deficient, prime |
| 984 | 1, 2, 3, 4, 6, 8, 12, 24, 41, 82, 123, 164, 246, 328, 492, 984 | 16 | 2520 | 1536 | abundant, composite |
| 985 | 1, 5, 197, 985 | 4 | 1188 | 203 | deficient, composite |
| 986 | 1, 2, 17, 29, 34, 58, 493, 986 | 8 | 1620 | 634 | deficient, composite |
| 987 | 1, 3, 7, 21, 47, 141, 329, 987 | 8 | 1536 | 549 | deficient, composite |
| 988 | 1, 2, 4, 13, 19, 26, 38, 52, 76, 247, 494, 988 | 12 | 1960 | 972 | deficient, composite |
| 989 | 1, 23, 43, 989 | 4 | 1056 | 67 | deficient, composite |
| 990 | 1, 2, 3, 5, 6, 9, 10, 11, 15, 18, 22, 30, 33, 45, 55, 66, 90, 99, 110, 165, 198, 330, 495, 990 | 24 | 2808 | 1818 | abundant, composite |
| 991 | 1, 991 | 2 | 992 | 1 | deficient, prime |
| 992 | 1, 2, 4, 8, 16, 31, 32, 62, 124, 248, 496, 992 | 12 | 2016 | 1024 | abundant, composite |
| 993 | 1, 3, 331, 993 | 4 | 1328 | 335 | deficient, composite |
| 994 | 1, 2, 7, 14, 71, 142, 497, 994 | 8 | 1728 | 734 | deficient, composite |
| 995 | 1, 5, 199, 995 | 4 | 1200 | 205 | deficient, composite |
| 996 | 1, 2, 3, 4, 6, 12, 83, 166, 249, 332, 498, 996 | 12 | 2352 | 1356 | abundant, composite |
| 997 | 1, 997 | 2 | 998 | 1 | deficient, prime |
| 998 | 1, 2, 499, 998 | 4 | 1500 | 502 | deficient, composite |
| 999 | 1, 3, 9, 27, 37, 111, 333, 999 | 8 | 1520 | 521 | deficient, composite |
| 1000 | 1, 2, 4, 5, 8, 10, 20, 25, 40, 50, 100, 125, 200, 250, 500, 1000 | 16 | 2340 | 1340 | abundant, composite |

== Sortable 1-1000 ==
| n | Divisors | d(n) | σ(n) | s(n) | Notes |
|---|---|---|---|---|---|
| 1 | 1 | 1 | 1 | 0 | deficient, highly abundant, highly composite |
| 2 | 1, 2 | 2 | 3 | 1 | deficient, highly abundant, prime, highly composite, superior highly composite |
| 3 | 1, 3 | 2 | 4 | 1 | deficient, highly abundant, prime |
| 4 | 1, 2, 4 | 3 | 7 | 3 | deficient, highly abundant, composite, highly composite |
| 5 | 1, 5 | 2 | 6 | 1 | deficient, prime |
| 6 | 1, 2, 3, 6 | 4 | 12 | 6 | perfect, highly abundant, composite, highly composite, superior highly composite |
| 7 | 1, 7 | 2 | 8 | 1 | deficient, prime |
| 8 | 1, 2, 4, 8 | 4 | 15 | 7 | deficient, highly abundant, composite |
| 9 | 1, 3, 9 | 3 | 13 | 4 | deficient, composite |
| 10 | 1, 2, 5, 10 | 4 | 18 | 8 | deficient, highly abundant, composite |
| 11 | 1, 11 | 2 | 12 | 1 | deficient, prime |
| 12 | 1, 2, 3, 4, 6, 12 | 6 | 28 | 16 | abundant, highly abundant, composite, highly composite, superior highly composite |
| 13 | 1, 13 | 2 | 14 | 1 | deficient, prime |
| 14 | 1, 2, 7, 14 | 4 | 24 | 10 | deficient, composite |
| 15 | 1, 3, 5, 15 | 4 | 24 | 9 | deficient, composite |
| 16 | 1, 2, 4, 8, 16 | 5 | 31 | 15 | deficient, highly abundant, composite |
| 17 | 1, 17 | 2 | 18 | 1 | deficient, prime |
| 18 | 1, 2, 3, 6, 9, 18 | 6 | 39 | 21 | abundant, highly abundant, composite |
| 19 | 1, 19 | 2 | 20 | 1 | deficient, prime |
| 20 | 1, 2, 4, 5, 10, 20 | 6 | 42 | 22 | abundant, highly abundant, composite, primitive abundant |
| 21 | 1, 3, 7, 21 | 4 | 32 | 11 | deficient, composite |
| 22 | 1, 2, 11, 22 | 4 | 36 | 14 | deficient, composite |
| 23 | 1, 23 | 2 | 24 | 1 | deficient, prime |
| 24 | 1, 2, 3, 4, 6, 8, 12, 24 | 8 | 60 | 36 | abundant, highly abundant, composite, highly composite |
| 25 | 1, 5, 25 | 3 | 31 | 6 | deficient, composite |
| 26 | 1, 2, 13, 26 | 4 | 42 | 16 | deficient, composite |
| 27 | 1, 3, 9, 27 | 4 | 40 | 13 | deficient, composite |
| 28 | 1, 2, 4, 7, 14, 28 | 6 | 56 | 28 | perfect, composite |
| 29 | 1, 29 | 2 | 30 | 1 | deficient, prime |
| 30 | 1, 2, 3, 5, 6, 10, 15, 30 | 8 | 72 | 42 | abundant, highly abundant, composite |
| 31 | 1, 31 | 2 | 32 | 1 | deficient, prime |
| 32 | 1, 2, 4, 8, 16, 32 | 6 | 63 | 31 | deficient, composite |
| 33 | 1, 3, 11, 33 | 4 | 48 | 15 | deficient, composite |
| 34 | 1, 2, 17, 34 | 4 | 54 | 20 | deficient, composite |
| 35 | 1, 5, 7, 35 | 4 | 48 | 13 | deficient, composite |
| 36 | 1, 2, 3, 4, 6, 9, 12, 18, 36 | 9 | 91 | 55 | abundant, highly abundant, composite, highly composite |
| 37 | 1, 37 | 2 | 38 | 1 | deficient, prime |
| 38 | 1, 2, 19, 38 | 4 | 60 | 22 | deficient, composite |
| 39 | 1, 3, 13, 39 | 4 | 56 | 17 | deficient, composite |
| 40 | 1, 2, 4, 5, 8, 10, 20, 40 | 8 | 90 | 50 | abundant, composite |
| 41 | 1, 41 | 2 | 42 | 1 | deficient, prime |
| 42 | 1, 2, 3, 6, 7, 14, 21, 42 | 8 | 96 | 54 | abundant, highly abundant, composite |
| 43 | 1, 43 | 2 | 44 | 1 | deficient, prime |
| 44 | 1, 2, 4, 11, 22, 44 | 6 | 84 | 40 | deficient, composite |
| 45 | 1, 3, 5, 9, 15, 45 | 6 | 78 | 33 | deficient, composite |
| 46 | 1, 2, 23, 46 | 4 | 72 | 26 | deficient, composite |
| 47 | 1, 47 | 2 | 48 | 1 | deficient, prime |
| 48 | 1, 2, 3, 4, 6, 8, 12, 16, 24, 48 | 10 | 124 | 76 | abundant, highly abundant, composite, highly composite |
| 49 | 1, 7, 49 | 3 | 57 | 8 | deficient, composite |
| 50 | 1, 2, 5, 10, 25, 50 | 6 | 93 | 43 | deficient, composite |
| 51 | 1, 3, 17, 51 | 4 | 72 | 21 | deficient, composite |
| 52 | 1, 2, 4, 13, 26, 52 | 6 | 98 | 46 | deficient, composite |
| 53 | 1, 53 | 2 | 54 | 1 | deficient, prime |
| 54 | 1, 2, 3, 6, 9, 18, 27, 54 | 8 | 120 | 66 | abundant, composite |
| 55 | 1, 5, 11, 55 | 4 | 72 | 17 | deficient, composite |
| 56 | 1, 2, 4, 7, 8, 14, 28, 56 | 8 | 120 | 64 | abundant, composite |
| 57 | 1, 3, 19, 57 | 4 | 80 | 23 | deficient, composite |
| 58 | 1, 2, 29, 58 | 4 | 90 | 32 | deficient, composite |
| 59 | 1, 59 | 2 | 60 | 1 | deficient, prime |
| 60 | 1, 2, 3, 4, 5, 6, 10, 12, 15, 20, 30, 60 | 12 | 168 | 108 | abundant, highly abundant, composite, highly composite, superior highly composite |
| 61 | 1, 61 | 2 | 62 | 1 | deficient, prime |
| 62 | 1, 2, 31, 62 | 4 | 96 | 34 | deficient, composite |
| 63 | 1, 3, 7, 9, 21, 63 | 6 | 104 | 41 | deficient, composite |
| 64 | 1, 2, 4, 8, 16, 32, 64 | 7 | 127 | 63 | deficient, composite |
| 65 | 1, 5, 13, 65 | 4 | 84 | 19 | deficient, composite |
| 66 | 1, 2, 3, 6, 11, 22, 33, 66 | 8 | 144 | 78 | abundant, composite |
| 67 | 1, 67 | 2 | 68 | 1 | deficient, prime |
| 68 | 1, 2, 4, 17, 34, 68 | 6 | 126 | 58 | deficient, composite |
| 69 | 1, 3, 23, 69 | 4 | 96 | 27 | deficient, composite |
| 70 | 1, 2, 5, 7, 10, 14, 35, 70 | 8 | 144 | 74 | abundant, composite, primitive abundant, weird |
| 71 | 1, 71 | 2 | 72 | 1 | deficient, prime |
| 72 | 1, 2, 3, 4, 6, 8, 9, 12, 18, 24, 36, 72 | 12 | 195 | 123 | abundant, highly abundant, composite |
| 73 | 1, 73 | 2 | 74 | 1 | deficient, prime |
| 74 | 1, 2, 37, 74 | 4 | 114 | 40 | deficient, composite |
| 75 | 1, 3, 5, 15, 25, 75 | 6 | 124 | 49 | deficient, composite |
| 76 | 1, 2, 4, 19, 38, 76 | 6 | 140 | 64 | deficient, composite |
| 77 | 1, 7, 11, 77 | 4 | 96 | 19 | deficient, composite |
| 78 | 1, 2, 3, 6, 13, 26, 39, 78 | 8 | 168 | 90 | abundant, composite |
| 79 | 1, 79 | 2 | 80 | 1 | deficient, prime |
| 80 | 1, 2, 4, 5, 8, 10, 16, 20, 40, 80 | 10 | 186 | 106 | abundant, composite |
| 81 | 1, 3, 9, 27, 81 | 5 | 121 | 40 | deficient, composite |
| 82 | 1, 2, 41, 82 | 4 | 126 | 44 | deficient, composite |
| 83 | 1, 83 | 2 | 84 | 1 | deficient, prime |
| 84 | 1, 2, 3, 4, 6, 7, 12, 14, 21, 28, 42, 84 | 12 | 224 | 140 | abundant, highly abundant, composite |
| 85 | 1, 5, 17, 85 | 4 | 108 | 23 | deficient, composite |
| 86 | 1, 2, 43, 86 | 4 | 132 | 46 | deficient, composite |
| 87 | 1, 3, 29, 87 | 4 | 120 | 33 | deficient, composite |
| 88 | 1, 2, 4, 8, 11, 22, 44, 88 | 8 | 180 | 92 | abundant, composite, primitive abundant |
| 89 | 1, 89 | 2 | 90 | 1 | deficient, prime |
| 90 | 1, 2, 3, 5, 6, 9, 10, 15, 18, 30, 45, 90 | 12 | 234 | 144 | abundant, highly abundant, composite |
| 91 | 1, 7, 13, 91 | 4 | 112 | 21 | deficient, composite |
| 92 | 1, 2, 4, 23, 46, 92 | 6 | 168 | 76 | deficient, composite |
| 93 | 1, 3, 31, 93 | 4 | 128 | 35 | deficient, composite |
| 94 | 1, 2, 47, 94 | 4 | 144 | 50 | deficient, composite |
| 95 | 1, 5, 19, 95 | 4 | 120 | 25 | deficient, composite |
| 96 | 1, 2, 3, 4, 6, 8, 12, 16, 24, 32, 48, 96 | 12 | 252 | 156 | abundant, highly abundant, composite |
| 97 | 1, 97 | 2 | 98 | 1 | deficient, prime |
| 98 | 1, 2, 7, 14, 49, 98 | 6 | 171 | 73 | deficient, composite |
| 99 | 1, 3, 9, 11, 33, 99 | 6 | 156 | 57 | deficient, composite |
| 100 | 1, 2, 4, 5, 10, 20, 25, 50, 100 | 9 | 217 | 117 | abundant, composite |
| 101 | 1, 101 | 2 | 102 | 1 | deficient, prime |
| 102 | 1, 2, 3, 6, 17, 34, 51, 102 | 8 | 216 | 114 | abundant, composite |
| 103 | 1, 103 | 2 | 104 | 1 | deficient, prime |
| 104 | 1, 2, 4, 8, 13, 26, 52, 104 | 8 | 210 | 106 | abundant, composite, primitive abundant |
| 105 | 1, 3, 5, 7, 15, 21, 35, 105 | 8 | 192 | 87 | deficient, composite |
| 106 | 1, 2, 53, 106 | 4 | 162 | 56 | deficient, composite |
| 107 | 1, 107 | 2 | 108 | 1 | deficient, prime |
| 108 | 1, 2, 3, 4, 6, 9, 12, 18, 27, 36, 54, 108 | 12 | 280 | 172 | abundant, highly abundant, composite |
| 109 | 1, 109 | 2 | 110 | 1 | deficient, prime |
| 110 | 1, 2, 5, 10, 11, 22, 55, 110 | 8 | 216 | 106 | deficient, composite |
| 111 | 1, 3, 37, 111 | 4 | 152 | 41 | deficient, composite |
| 112 | 1, 2, 4, 7, 8, 14, 16, 28, 56, 112 | 10 | 248 | 136 | abundant, composite |
| 113 | 1, 113 | 2 | 114 | 1 | deficient, prime |
| 114 | 1, 2, 3, 6, 19, 38, 57, 114 | 8 | 240 | 126 | abundant, composite |
| 115 | 1, 5, 23, 115 | 4 | 144 | 29 | deficient, composite |
| 116 | 1, 2, 4, 29, 58, 116 | 6 | 210 | 94 | deficient, composite |
| 117 | 1, 3, 9, 13, 39, 117 | 6 | 182 | 65 | deficient, composite |
| 118 | 1, 2, 59, 118 | 4 | 180 | 62 | deficient, composite |
| 119 | 1, 7, 17, 119 | 4 | 144 | 25 | deficient, composite |
| 120 | 1, 2, 3, 4, 5, 6, 8, 10, 12, 15, 20, 24, 30, 40, 60, 120 | 16 | 360 | 240 | abundant, highly abundant, composite, highly composite, superior highly composite |
| 121 | 1, 11, 121 | 3 | 133 | 12 | deficient, composite |
| 122 | 1, 2, 61, 122 | 4 | 186 | 64 | deficient, composite |
| 123 | 1, 3, 41, 123 | 4 | 168 | 45 | deficient, composite |
| 124 | 1, 2, 4, 31, 62, 124 | 6 | 224 | 100 | deficient, composite |
| 125 | 1, 5, 25, 125 | 4 | 156 | 31 | deficient, composite |
| 126 | 1, 2, 3, 6, 7, 9, 14, 18, 21, 42, 63, 126 | 12 | 312 | 186 | abundant, composite |
| 127 | 1, 127 | 2 | 128 | 1 | deficient, prime |
| 128 | 1, 2, 4, 8, 16, 32, 64, 128 | 8 | 255 | 127 | deficient, composite |
| 129 | 1, 3, 43, 129 | 4 | 176 | 47 | deficient, composite |
| 130 | 1, 2, 5, 10, 13, 26, 65, 130 | 8 | 252 | 122 | deficient, composite |
| 131 | 1, 131 | 2 | 132 | 1 | deficient, prime |
| 132 | 1, 2, 3, 4, 6, 11, 12, 22, 33, 44, 66, 132 | 12 | 336 | 204 | abundant, composite |
| 133 | 1, 7, 19, 133 | 4 | 160 | 27 | deficient, composite |
| 134 | 1, 2, 67, 134 | 4 | 204 | 70 | deficient, composite |
| 135 | 1, 3, 5, 9, 15, 27, 45, 135 | 8 | 240 | 105 | deficient, composite |
| 136 | 1, 2, 4, 8, 17, 34, 68, 136 | 8 | 270 | 134 | deficient, composite |
| 137 | 1, 137 | 2 | 138 | 1 | deficient, prime |
| 138 | 1, 2, 3, 6, 23, 46, 69, 138 | 8 | 288 | 150 | abundant, composite |
| 139 | 1, 139 | 2 | 140 | 1 | deficient, prime |
| 140 | 1, 2, 4, 5, 7, 10, 14, 20, 28, 35, 70, 140 | 12 | 336 | 196 | abundant, composite |
| 141 | 1, 3, 47, 141 | 4 | 192 | 51 | deficient, composite |
| 142 | 1, 2, 71, 142 | 4 | 216 | 74 | deficient, composite |
| 143 | 1, 11, 13, 143 | 4 | 168 | 25 | deficient, composite |
| 144 | 1, 2, 3, 4, 6, 8, 9, 12, 16, 18, 24, 36, 48, 72, 144 | 15 | 403 | 259 | abundant, highly abundant, composite |
| 145 | 1, 5, 29, 145 | 4 | 180 | 35 | deficient, composite |
| 146 | 1, 2, 73, 146 | 4 | 222 | 76 | deficient, composite |
| 147 | 1, 3, 7, 21, 49, 147 | 6 | 228 | 81 | deficient, composite |
| 148 | 1, 2, 4, 37, 74, 148 | 6 | 266 | 118 | deficient, composite |
| 149 | 1, 149 | 2 | 150 | 1 | deficient, prime |
| 150 | 1, 2, 3, 5, 6, 10, 15, 25, 30, 50, 75, 150 | 12 | 372 | 222 | abundant, composite |
| 151 | 1, 151 | 2 | 152 | 1 | deficient, prime |
| 152 | 1, 2, 4, 8, 19, 38, 76, 152 | 8 | 300 | 148 | deficient, composite |
| 153 | 1, 3, 9, 17, 51, 153 | 6 | 234 | 81 | deficient, composite |
| 154 | 1, 2, 7, 11, 14, 22, 77, 154 | 8 | 288 | 134 | deficient, composite |
| 155 | 1, 5, 31, 155 | 4 | 192 | 37 | deficient, composite |
| 156 | 1, 2, 3, 4, 6, 12, 13, 26, 39, 52, 78, 156 | 12 | 392 | 236 | abundant, composite |
| 157 | 1, 157 | 2 | 158 | 1 | deficient, prime |
| 158 | 1, 2, 79, 158 | 4 | 240 | 82 | deficient, composite |
| 159 | 1, 3, 53, 159 | 4 | 216 | 57 | deficient, composite |
| 160 | 1, 2, 4, 5, 8, 10, 16, 20, 32, 40, 80, 160 | 12 | 378 | 218 | abundant, composite |
| 161 | 1, 7, 23, 161 | 4 | 192 | 31 | deficient, composite |
| 162 | 1, 2, 3, 6, 9, 18, 27, 54, 81, 162 | 10 | 363 | 201 | abundant, composite |
| 163 | 1, 163 | 2 | 164 | 1 | deficient, prime |
| 164 | 1, 2, 4, 41, 82, 164 | 6 | 294 | 130 | deficient, composite |
| 165 | 1, 3, 5, 11, 15, 33, 55, 165 | 8 | 288 | 123 | deficient, composite |
| 166 | 1, 2, 83, 166 | 4 | 252 | 86 | deficient, composite |
| 167 | 1, 167 | 2 | 168 | 1 | deficient, prime |
| 168 | 1, 2, 3, 4, 6, 7, 8, 12, 14, 21, 24, 28, 42, 56, 84, 168 | 16 | 480 | 312 | abundant, highly abundant, composite |
| 169 | 1, 13, 169 | 3 | 183 | 14 | deficient, composite |
| 170 | 1, 2, 5, 10, 17, 34, 85, 170 | 8 | 324 | 154 | deficient, composite |
| 171 | 1, 3, 9, 19, 57, 171 | 6 | 260 | 89 | deficient, composite |
| 172 | 1, 2, 4, 43, 86, 172 | 6 | 308 | 136 | deficient, composite |
| 173 | 1, 173 | 2 | 174 | 1 | deficient, prime |
| 174 | 1, 2, 3, 6, 29, 58, 87, 174 | 8 | 360 | 186 | abundant, composite |
| 175 | 1, 5, 7, 25, 35, 175 | 6 | 248 | 73 | deficient, composite |
| 176 | 1, 2, 4, 8, 11, 16, 22, 44, 88, 176 | 10 | 372 | 196 | abundant, composite |
| 177 | 1, 3, 59, 177 | 4 | 240 | 63 | deficient, composite |
| 178 | 1, 2, 89, 178 | 4 | 270 | 92 | deficient, composite |
| 179 | 1, 179 | 2 | 180 | 1 | deficient, prime |
| 180 | 1, 2, 3, 4, 5, 6, 9, 10, 12, 15, 18, 20, 30, 36, 45, 60, 90, 180 | 18 | 546 | 366 | abundant, highly abundant, composite, highly composite |
| 181 | 1, 181 | 2 | 182 | 1 | deficient, prime |
| 182 | 1, 2, 7, 13, 14, 26, 91, 182 | 8 | 336 | 154 | deficient, composite |
| 183 | 1, 3, 61, 183 | 4 | 248 | 65 | deficient, composite |
| 184 | 1, 2, 4, 8, 23, 46, 92, 184 | 8 | 360 | 176 | deficient, composite |
| 185 | 1, 5, 37, 185 | 4 | 228 | 43 | deficient, composite |
| 186 | 1, 2, 3, 6, 31, 62, 93, 186 | 8 | 384 | 198 | abundant, composite |
| 187 | 1, 11, 17, 187 | 4 | 216 | 29 | deficient, composite |
| 188 | 1, 2, 4, 47, 94, 188 | 6 | 336 | 148 | deficient, composite |
| 189 | 1, 3, 7, 9, 21, 27, 63, 189 | 8 | 320 | 131 | deficient, composite |
| 190 | 1, 2, 5, 10, 19, 38, 95, 190 | 8 | 360 | 170 | deficient, composite |
| 191 | 1, 191 | 2 | 192 | 1 | deficient, prime |
| 192 | 1, 2, 3, 4, 6, 8, 12, 16, 24, 32, 48, 64, 96, 192 | 14 | 508 | 316 | abundant, composite |
| 193 | 1, 193 | 2 | 194 | 1 | deficient, prime |
| 194 | 1, 2, 97, 194 | 4 | 294 | 100 | deficient, composite |
| 195 | 1, 3, 5, 13, 15, 39, 65, 195 | 8 | 336 | 141 | deficient, composite |
| 196 | 1, 2, 4, 7, 14, 28, 49, 98, 196 | 9 | 399 | 203 | abundant, composite |
| 197 | 1, 197 | 2 | 198 | 1 | deficient, prime |
| 198 | 1, 2, 3, 6, 9, 11, 18, 22, 33, 66, 99, 198 | 12 | 468 | 270 | abundant, composite |
| 199 | 1, 199 | 2 | 200 | 1 | deficient, prime |
| 200 | 1, 2, 4, 5, 8, 10, 20, 25, 40, 50, 100, 200 | 12 | 465 | 265 | abundant, composite |
| 201 | 1, 3, 67, 201 | 4 | 272 | 71 | deficient, composite |
| 202 | 1, 2, 101, 202 | 4 | 306 | 104 | deficient, composite |
| 203 | 1, 7, 29, 203 | 4 | 240 | 37 | deficient, composite |
| 204 | 1, 2, 3, 4, 6, 12, 17, 34, 51, 68, 102, 204 | 12 | 504 | 300 | abundant, composite |
| 205 | 1, 5, 41, 205 | 4 | 252 | 47 | deficient, composite |
| 206 | 1, 2, 103, 206 | 4 | 312 | 106 | deficient, composite |
| 207 | 1, 3, 9, 23, 69, 207 | 6 | 312 | 105 | deficient, composite |
| 208 | 1, 2, 4, 8, 13, 16, 26, 52, 104, 208 | 10 | 434 | 226 | abundant, composite |
| 209 | 1, 11, 19, 209 | 4 | 240 | 31 | deficient, composite |
| 210 | 1, 2, 3, 5, 6, 7, 10, 14, 15, 21, 30, 35, 42, 70, 105, 210 | 16 | 576 | 366 | abundant, highly abundant, composite |
| 211 | 1, 211 | 2 | 212 | 1 | deficient, prime |
| 212 | 1, 2, 4, 53, 106, 212 | 6 | 378 | 166 | deficient, composite |
| 213 | 1, 3, 71, 213 | 4 | 288 | 75 | deficient, composite |
| 214 | 1, 2, 107, 214 | 4 | 324 | 110 | deficient, composite |
| 215 | 1, 5, 43, 215 | 4 | 264 | 49 | deficient, composite |
| 216 | 1, 2, 3, 4, 6, 8, 9, 12, 18, 24, 27, 36, 54, 72, 108, 216 | 16 | 600 | 384 | abundant, highly abundant, composite |
| 217 | 1, 7, 31, 217 | 4 | 256 | 39 | deficient, composite |
| 218 | 1, 2, 109, 218 | 4 | 330 | 112 | deficient, composite |
| 219 | 1, 3, 73, 219 | 4 | 296 | 77 | deficient, composite |
| 220 | 1, 2, 4, 5, 10, 11, 20, 22, 44, 55, 110, 220 | 12 | 504 | 284 | abundant, composite |
| 221 | 1, 13, 17, 221 | 4 | 252 | 31 | deficient, composite |
| 222 | 1, 2, 3, 6, 37, 74, 111, 222 | 8 | 456 | 234 | abundant, composite |
| 223 | 1, 223 | 2 | 224 | 1 | deficient, prime |
| 224 | 1, 2, 4, 7, 8, 14, 16, 28, 32, 56, 112, 224 | 12 | 504 | 280 | abundant, composite |
| 225 | 1, 3, 5, 9, 15, 25, 45, 75, 225 | 9 | 403 | 178 | deficient, composite |
| 226 | 1, 2, 113, 226 | 4 | 342 | 116 | deficient, composite |
| 227 | 1, 227 | 2 | 228 | 1 | deficient, prime |
| 228 | 1, 2, 3, 4, 6, 12, 19, 38, 57, 76, 114, 228 | 12 | 560 | 332 | abundant, composite |
| 229 | 1, 229 | 2 | 230 | 1 | deficient, prime |
| 230 | 1, 2, 5, 10, 23, 46, 115, 230 | 8 | 432 | 202 | deficient, composite |
| 231 | 1, 3, 7, 11, 21, 33, 77, 231 | 8 | 384 | 153 | deficient, composite |
| 232 | 1, 2, 4, 8, 29, 58, 116, 232 | 8 | 450 | 218 | deficient, composite |
| 233 | 1, 233 | 2 | 234 | 1 | deficient, prime |
| 234 | 1, 2, 3, 6, 9, 13, 18, 26, 39, 78, 117, 234 | 12 | 546 | 312 | abundant, composite |
| 235 | 1, 5, 47, 235 | 4 | 288 | 53 | deficient, composite |
| 236 | 1, 2, 4, 59, 118, 236 | 6 | 420 | 184 | deficient, composite |
| 237 | 1, 3, 79, 237 | 4 | 320 | 83 | deficient, composite |
| 238 | 1, 2, 7, 14, 17, 34, 119, 238 | 8 | 432 | 194 | deficient, composite |
| 239 | 1, 239 | 2 | 240 | 1 | deficient, prime |
| 240 | 1, 2, 3, 4, 5, 6, 8, 10, 12, 15, 16, 20, 24, 30, 40, 48, 60, 80, 120, 240 | 20 | 744 | 504 | abundant, highly abundant, composite, highly composite |
| 241 | 1, 241 | 2 | 242 | 1 | deficient, prime |
| 242 | 1, 2, 11, 22, 121, 242 | 6 | 399 | 157 | deficient, composite |
| 243 | 1, 3, 9, 27, 81, 243 | 6 | 364 | 121 | deficient, composite |
| 244 | 1, 2, 4, 61, 122, 244 | 6 | 434 | 190 | deficient, composite |
| 245 | 1, 5, 7, 35, 49, 245 | 6 | 342 | 97 | deficient, composite |
| 246 | 1, 2, 3, 6, 41, 82, 123, 246 | 8 | 504 | 258 | abundant, composite |
| 247 | 1, 13, 19, 247 | 4 | 280 | 33 | deficient, composite |
| 248 | 1, 2, 4, 8, 31, 62, 124, 248 | 8 | 480 | 232 | deficient, composite |
| 249 | 1, 3, 83, 249 | 4 | 336 | 87 | deficient, composite |
| 250 | 1, 2, 5, 10, 25, 50, 125, 250 | 8 | 468 | 218 | deficient, composite |
| 251 | 1, 251 | 2 | 252 | 1 | deficient, prime |
| 252 | 1, 2, 3, 4, 6, 7, 9, 12, 14, 18, 21, 28, 36, 42, 63, 84, 126, 252 | 18 | 728 | 476 | abundant, composite |
| 253 | 1, 11, 23, 253 | 4 | 288 | 35 | deficient, composite |
| 254 | 1, 2, 127, 254 | 4 | 384 | 130 | deficient, composite |
| 255 | 1, 3, 5, 15, 17, 51, 85, 255 | 8 | 432 | 177 | deficient, composite |
| 256 | 1, 2, 4, 8, 16, 32, 64, 128, 256 | 9 | 511 | 255 | deficient, composite |
| 257 | 1, 257 | 2 | 258 | 1 | deficient, prime |
| 258 | 1, 2, 3, 6, 43, 86, 129, 258 | 8 | 528 | 270 | abundant, composite |
| 259 | 1, 7, 37, 259 | 4 | 304 | 45 | deficient, composite |
| 260 | 1, 2, 4, 5, 10, 13, 20, 26, 52, 65, 130, 260 | 12 | 588 | 328 | abundant, composite |
| 261 | 1, 3, 9, 29, 87, 261 | 6 | 390 | 129 | deficient, composite |
| 262 | 1, 2, 131, 262 | 4 | 396 | 134 | deficient, composite |
| 263 | 1, 263 | 2 | 264 | 1 | deficient, prime |
| 264 | 1, 2, 3, 4, 6, 8, 11, 12, 22, 24, 33, 44, 66, 88, 132, 264 | 16 | 720 | 456 | abundant, composite |
| 265 | 1, 5, 53, 265 | 4 | 324 | 59 | deficient, composite |
| 266 | 1, 2, 7, 14, 19, 38, 133, 266 | 8 | 480 | 214 | deficient, composite |
| 267 | 1, 3, 89, 267 | 4 | 360 | 93 | deficient, composite |
| 268 | 1, 2, 4, 67, 134, 268 | 6 | 476 | 208 | deficient, composite |
| 269 | 1, 269 | 2 | 270 | 1 | deficient, prime |
| 270 | 1, 2, 3, 5, 6, 9, 10, 15, 18, 27, 30, 45, 54, 90, 135, 270 | 16 | 720 | 450 | abundant, composite |
| 271 | 1, 271 | 2 | 272 | 1 | deficient, prime |
| 272 | 1, 2, 4, 8, 16, 17, 34, 68, 136, 272 | 10 | 558 | 286 | abundant, composite, primitive abundant |
| 273 | 1, 3, 7, 13, 21, 39, 91, 273 | 8 | 448 | 175 | deficient, composite |
| 274 | 1, 2, 137, 274 | 4 | 414 | 140 | deficient, composite |
| 275 | 1, 5, 11, 25, 55, 275 | 6 | 372 | 97 | deficient, composite |
| 276 | 1, 2, 3, 4, 6, 12, 23, 46, 69, 92, 138, 276 | 12 | 672 | 396 | abundant, composite |
| 277 | 1, 277 | 2 | 278 | 1 | deficient, prime |
| 278 | 1, 2, 139, 278 | 4 | 420 | 142 | deficient, composite |
| 279 | 1, 3, 9, 31, 93, 279 | 6 | 416 | 137 | deficient, composite |
| 280 | 1, 2, 4, 5, 7, 8, 10, 14, 20, 28, 35, 40, 56, 70, 140, 280 | 16 | 720 | 440 | abundant, composite |
| 281 | 1, 281 | 2 | 282 | 1 | deficient, prime |
| 282 | 1, 2, 3, 6, 47, 94, 141, 282 | 8 | 576 | 294 | abundant, composite |
| 283 | 1, 283 | 2 | 284 | 1 | deficient, prime |
| 284 | 1, 2, 4, 71, 142, 284 | 6 | 504 | 220 | deficient, composite |
| 285 | 1, 3, 5, 15, 19, 57, 95, 285 | 8 | 480 | 195 | deficient, composite |
| 286 | 1, 2, 11, 13, 22, 26, 143, 286 | 8 | 504 | 218 | deficient, composite |
| 287 | 1, 7, 41, 287 | 4 | 336 | 49 | deficient, composite |
| 288 | 1, 2, 3, 4, 6, 8, 9, 12, 16, 18, 24, 32, 36, 48, 72, 96, 144, 288 | 18 | 819 | 531 | abundant, highly abundant, composite |
| 289 | 1, 17, 289 | 3 | 307 | 18 | deficient, composite |
| 290 | 1, 2, 5, 10, 29, 58, 145, 290 | 8 | 540 | 250 | deficient, composite |
| 291 | 1, 3, 97, 291 | 4 | 392 | 101 | deficient, composite |
| 292 | 1, 2, 4, 73, 146, 292 | 6 | 518 | 226 | deficient, composite |
| 293 | 1, 293 | 2 | 294 | 1 | deficient, prime |
| 294 | 1, 2, 3, 6, 7, 14, 21, 42, 49, 98, 147, 294 | 12 | 684 | 390 | abundant, composite |
| 295 | 1, 5, 59, 295 | 4 | 360 | 65 | deficient, composite |
| 296 | 1, 2, 4, 8, 37, 74, 148, 296 | 8 | 570 | 274 | deficient, composite |
| 297 | 1, 3, 9, 11, 27, 33, 99, 297 | 8 | 480 | 183 | deficient, composite |
| 298 | 1, 2, 149, 298 | 4 | 450 | 152 | deficient, composite |
| 299 | 1, 13, 23, 299 | 4 | 336 | 37 | deficient, composite |
| 300 | 1, 2, 3, 4, 5, 6, 10, 12, 15, 20, 25, 30, 50, 60, 75, 100, 150, 300 | 18 | 868 | 568 | abundant, highly abundant, composite |
| 301 | 1, 7, 43, 301 | 4 | 352 | 51 | deficient, composite |
| 302 | 1, 2, 151, 302 | 4 | 456 | 154 | deficient, composite |
| 303 | 1, 3, 101, 303 | 4 | 408 | 105 | deficient, composite |
| 304 | 1, 2, 4, 8, 16, 19, 38, 76, 152, 304 | 10 | 620 | 316 | abundant, composite, primitive abundant |
| 305 | 1, 5, 61, 305 | 4 | 372 | 67 | deficient, composite |
| 306 | 1, 2, 3, 6, 9, 17, 18, 34, 51, 102, 153, 306 | 12 | 702 | 396 | abundant, composite |
| 307 | 1, 307 | 2 | 308 | 1 | deficient, prime |
| 308 | 1, 2, 4, 7, 11, 14, 22, 28, 44, 77, 154, 308 | 12 | 672 | 364 | abundant, composite |
| 309 | 1, 3, 103, 309 | 4 | 416 | 107 | deficient, composite |
| 310 | 1, 2, 5, 10, 31, 62, 155, 310 | 8 | 576 | 266 | deficient, composite |
| 311 | 1, 311 | 2 | 312 | 1 | deficient, prime |
| 312 | 1, 2, 3, 4, 6, 8, 12, 13, 24, 26, 39, 52, 78, 104, 156, 312 | 16 | 840 | 528 | abundant, composite |
| 313 | 1, 313 | 2 | 314 | 1 | deficient, prime |
| 314 | 1, 2, 157, 314 | 4 | 474 | 160 | deficient, composite |
| 315 | 1, 3, 5, 7, 9, 15, 21, 35, 45, 63, 105, 315 | 12 | 624 | 309 | deficient, composite |
| 316 | 1, 2, 4, 79, 158, 316 | 6 | 560 | 244 | deficient, composite |
| 317 | 1, 317 | 2 | 318 | 1 | deficient, prime |
| 318 | 1, 2, 3, 6, 53, 106, 159, 318 | 8 | 648 | 330 | abundant, composite |
| 319 | 1, 11, 29, 319 | 4 | 360 | 41 | deficient, composite |
| 320 | 1, 2, 4, 5, 8, 10, 16, 20, 32, 40, 64, 80, 160, 320 | 14 | 762 | 442 | abundant, composite |
| 321 | 1, 3, 107, 321 | 4 | 432 | 111 | deficient, composite |
| 322 | 1, 2, 7, 14, 23, 46, 161, 322 | 8 | 576 | 254 | deficient, composite |
| 323 | 1, 17, 19, 323 | 4 | 360 | 37 | deficient, composite |
| 324 | 1, 2, 3, 4, 6, 9, 12, 18, 27, 36, 54, 81, 108, 162, 324 | 15 | 847 | 523 | abundant, composite |
| 325 | 1, 5, 13, 25, 65, 325 | 6 | 434 | 109 | deficient, composite |
| 326 | 1, 2, 163, 326 | 4 | 492 | 166 | deficient, composite |
| 327 | 1, 3, 109, 327 | 4 | 440 | 113 | deficient, composite |
| 328 | 1, 2, 4, 8, 41, 82, 164, 328 | 8 | 630 | 302 | deficient, composite |
| 329 | 1, 7, 47, 329 | 4 | 384 | 55 | deficient, composite |
| 330 | 1, 2, 3, 5, 6, 10, 11, 15, 22, 30, 33, 55, 66, 110, 165, 330 | 16 | 864 | 534 | abundant, composite |
| 331 | 1, 331 | 2 | 332 | 1 | deficient, prime |
| 332 | 1, 2, 4, 83, 166, 332 | 6 | 588 | 256 | deficient, composite |
| 333 | 1, 3, 9, 37, 111, 333 | 6 | 494 | 161 | deficient, composite |
| 334 | 1, 2, 167, 334 | 4 | 504 | 170 | deficient, composite |
| 335 | 1, 5, 67, 335 | 4 | 408 | 73 | deficient, composite |
| 336 | 1, 2, 3, 4, 6, 7, 8, 12, 14, 16, 21, 24, 28, 42, 48, 56, 84, 112, 168, 336 | 20 | 992 | 656 | abundant, highly abundant, composite |
| 337 | 1, 337 | 2 | 338 | 1 | deficient, prime |
| 338 | 1, 2, 13, 26, 169, 338 | 6 | 549 | 211 | deficient, composite |
| 339 | 1, 3, 113, 339 | 4 | 456 | 117 | deficient, composite |
| 340 | 1, 2, 4, 5, 10, 17, 20, 34, 68, 85, 170, 340 | 12 | 756 | 416 | abundant, composite |
| 341 | 1, 11, 31, 341 | 4 | 384 | 43 | deficient, composite |
| 342 | 1, 2, 3, 6, 9, 18, 19, 38, 57, 114, 171, 342 | 12 | 780 | 438 | abundant, composite |
| 343 | 1, 7, 49, 343 | 4 | 400 | 57 | deficient, composite |
| 344 | 1, 2, 4, 8, 43, 86, 172, 344 | 8 | 660 | 316 | deficient, composite |
| 345 | 1, 3, 5, 15, 23, 69, 115, 345 | 8 | 576 | 231 | deficient, composite |
| 346 | 1, 2, 173, 346 | 4 | 522 | 176 | deficient, composite |
| 347 | 1, 347 | 2 | 348 | 1 | deficient, prime |
| 348 | 1, 2, 3, 4, 6, 12, 29, 58, 87, 116, 174, 348 | 12 | 840 | 492 | abundant, composite |
| 349 | 1, 349 | 2 | 350 | 1 | deficient, prime |
| 350 | 1, 2, 5, 7, 10, 14, 25, 35, 50, 70, 175, 350 | 12 | 744 | 394 | abundant, composite |
| 351 | 1, 3, 9, 13, 27, 39, 117, 351 | 8 | 560 | 209 | deficient, composite |
| 352 | 1, 2, 4, 8, 11, 16, 22, 32, 44, 88, 176, 352 | 12 | 756 | 404 | abundant, composite |
| 353 | 1, 353 | 2 | 354 | 1 | deficient, prime |
| 354 | 1, 2, 3, 6, 59, 118, 177, 354 | 8 | 720 | 366 | abundant, composite |
| 355 | 1, 5, 71, 355 | 4 | 432 | 77 | deficient, composite |
| 356 | 1, 2, 4, 89, 178, 356 | 6 | 630 | 274 | deficient, composite |
| 357 | 1, 3, 7, 17, 21, 51, 119, 357 | 8 | 576 | 219 | deficient, composite |
| 358 | 1, 2, 179, 358 | 4 | 540 | 182 | deficient, composite |
| 359 | 1, 359 | 2 | 360 | 1 | deficient, prime |
| 360 | 1, 2, 3, 4, 5, 6, 8, 9, 10, 12, 15, 18, 20, 24, 30, 36, 40, 45, 60, 72, 90, 120, 180, 360 | 24 | 1170 | 810 | abundant, highly abundant, composite, highly composite, superior highly composite |
| 361 | 1, 19, 361 | 3 | 381 | 20 | deficient, composite |
| 362 | 1, 2, 181, 362 | 4 | 546 | 184 | deficient, composite |
| 363 | 1, 3, 11, 33, 121, 363 | 6 | 532 | 169 | deficient, composite |
| 364 | 1, 2, 4, 7, 13, 14, 26, 28, 52, 91, 182, 364 | 12 | 784 | 420 | abundant, composite |
| 365 | 1, 5, 73, 365 | 4 | 444 | 79 | deficient, composite |
| 366 | 1, 2, 3, 6, 61, 122, 183, 366 | 8 | 744 | 378 | abundant, composite |
| 367 | 1, 367 | 2 | 368 | 1 | deficient, prime |
| 368 | 1, 2, 4, 8, 16, 23, 46, 92, 184, 368 | 10 | 744 | 376 | abundant, composite, primitive abundant |
| 369 | 1, 3, 9, 41, 123, 369 | 6 | 546 | 177 | deficient, composite |
| 370 | 1, 2, 5, 10, 37, 74, 185, 370 | 8 | 684 | 314 | deficient, composite |
| 371 | 1, 7, 53, 371 | 4 | 432 | 61 | deficient, composite |
| 372 | 1, 2, 3, 4, 6, 12, 31, 62, 93, 124, 186, 372 | 12 | 896 | 524 | abundant, composite |
| 373 | 1, 373 | 2 | 374 | 1 | deficient, prime |
| 374 | 1, 2, 11, 17, 22, 34, 187, 374 | 8 | 648 | 274 | deficient, composite |
| 375 | 1, 3, 5, 15, 25, 75, 125, 375 | 8 | 624 | 249 | deficient, composite |
| 376 | 1, 2, 4, 8, 47, 94, 188, 376 | 8 | 720 | 344 | deficient, composite |
| 377 | 1, 13, 29, 377 | 4 | 420 | 43 | deficient, composite |
| 378 | 1, 2, 3, 6, 7, 9, 14, 18, 21, 27, 42, 54, 63, 126, 189, 378 | 16 | 960 | 582 | abundant, composite |
| 379 | 1, 379 | 2 | 380 | 1 | deficient, prime |
| 380 | 1, 2, 4, 5, 10, 19, 20, 38, 76, 95, 190, 380 | 12 | 840 | 460 | abundant, composite |
| 381 | 1, 3, 127, 381 | 4 | 512 | 131 | deficient, composite |
| 382 | 1, 2, 191, 382 | 4 | 576 | 194 | deficient, composite |
| 383 | 1, 383 | 2 | 384 | 1 | deficient, prime |
| 384 | 1, 2, 3, 4, 6, 8, 12, 16, 24, 32, 48, 64, 96, 128, 192, 384 | 16 | 1020 | 636 | abundant, composite |
| 385 | 1, 5, 7, 11, 35, 55, 77, 385 | 8 | 576 | 191 | deficient, composite |
| 386 | 1, 2, 193, 386 | 4 | 582 | 196 | deficient, composite |
| 387 | 1, 3, 9, 43, 129, 387 | 6 | 572 | 185 | deficient, composite |
| 388 | 1, 2, 4, 97, 194, 388 | 6 | 686 | 298 | deficient, composite |
| 389 | 1, 389 | 2 | 390 | 1 | deficient, prime |
| 390 | 1, 2, 3, 5, 6, 10, 13, 15, 26, 30, 39, 65, 78, 130, 195, 390 | 16 | 1008 | 618 | abundant, composite |
| 391 | 1, 17, 23, 391 | 4 | 432 | 41 | deficient, composite |
| 392 | 1, 2, 4, 7, 8, 14, 28, 49, 56, 98, 196, 392 | 12 | 855 | 463 | abundant, composite |
| 393 | 1, 3, 131, 393 | 4 | 528 | 135 | deficient, composite |
| 394 | 1, 2, 197, 394 | 4 | 594 | 200 | deficient, composite |
| 395 | 1, 5, 79, 395 | 4 | 480 | 85 | deficient, composite |
| 396 | 1, 2, 3, 4, 6, 9, 11, 12, 18, 22, 33, 36, 44, 66, 99, 132, 198, 396 | 18 | 1092 | 696 | abundant, composite |
| 397 | 1, 397 | 2 | 398 | 1 | deficient, prime |
| 398 | 1, 2, 199, 398 | 4 | 600 | 202 | deficient, composite |
| 399 | 1, 3, 7, 19, 21, 57, 133, 399 | 8 | 640 | 241 | deficient, composite |
| 400 | 1, 2, 4, 5, 8, 10, 16, 20, 25, 40, 50, 80, 100, 200, 400 | 15 | 961 | 561 | abundant, composite |
| 401 | 1, 401 | 2 | 402 | 1 | deficient, prime |
| 402 | 1, 2, 3, 6, 67, 134, 201, 402 | 8 | 816 | 414 | abundant, composite |
| 403 | 1, 13, 31, 403 | 4 | 448 | 45 | deficient, composite |
| 404 | 1, 2, 4, 101, 202, 404 | 6 | 714 | 310 | deficient, composite |
| 405 | 1, 3, 5, 9, 15, 27, 45, 81, 135, 405 | 10 | 726 | 321 | deficient, composite |
| 406 | 1, 2, 7, 14, 29, 58, 203, 406 | 8 | 720 | 314 | deficient, composite |
| 407 | 1, 11, 37, 407 | 4 | 456 | 49 | deficient, composite |
| 408 | 1, 2, 3, 4, 6, 8, 12, 17, 24, 34, 51, 68, 102, 136, 204, 408 | 16 | 1080 | 672 | abundant, composite |
| 409 | 1, 409 | 2 | 410 | 1 | deficient, prime |
| 410 | 1, 2, 5, 10, 41, 82, 205, 410 | 8 | 756 | 346 | deficient, composite |
| 411 | 1, 3, 137, 411 | 4 | 552 | 141 | deficient, composite |
| 412 | 1, 2, 4, 103, 206, 412 | 6 | 728 | 316 | deficient, composite |
| 413 | 1, 7, 59, 413 | 4 | 480 | 67 | deficient, composite |
| 414 | 1, 2, 3, 6, 9, 18, 23, 46, 69, 138, 207, 414 | 12 | 936 | 522 | abundant, composite |
| 415 | 1, 5, 83, 415 | 4 | 504 | 89 | deficient, composite |
| 416 | 1, 2, 4, 8, 13, 16, 26, 32, 52, 104, 208, 416 | 12 | 882 | 466 | abundant, composite |
| 417 | 1, 3, 139, 417 | 4 | 560 | 143 | deficient, composite |
| 418 | 1, 2, 11, 19, 22, 38, 209, 418 | 8 | 720 | 302 | deficient, composite |
| 419 | 1, 419 | 2 | 420 | 1 | deficient, prime |
| 420 | 1, 2, 3, 4, 5, 6, 7, 10, 12, 14, 15, 20, 21, 28, 30, 35, 42, 60, 70, 84, 105, 140, 210, 420 | 24 | 1344 | 924 | abundant, highly abundant, composite |
| 421 | 1, 421 | 2 | 422 | 1 | deficient, prime |
| 422 | 1, 2, 211, 422 | 4 | 636 | 214 | deficient, composite |
| 423 | 1, 3, 9, 47, 141, 423 | 6 | 624 | 201 | deficient, composite |
| 424 | 1, 2, 4, 8, 53, 106, 212, 424 | 8 | 810 | 386 | deficient, composite |
| 425 | 1, 5, 17, 25, 85, 425 | 6 | 558 | 133 | deficient, composite |
| 426 | 1, 2, 3, 6, 71, 142, 213, 426 | 8 | 864 | 438 | abundant, composite |
| 427 | 1, 7, 61, 427 | 4 | 496 | 69 | deficient, composite |
| 428 | 1, 2, 4, 107, 214, 428 | 6 | 756 | 328 | deficient, composite |
| 429 | 1, 3, 11, 13, 33, 39, 143, 429 | 8 | 672 | 243 | deficient, composite |
| 430 | 1, 2, 5, 10, 43, 86, 215, 430 | 8 | 792 | 362 | deficient, composite |
| 431 | 1, 431 | 2 | 432 | 1 | deficient, prime |
| 432 | 1, 2, 3, 4, 6, 8, 9, 12, 16, 18, 24, 27, 36, 48, 54, 72, 108, 144, 216, 432 | 20 | 1240 | 808 | abundant, composite |
| 433 | 1, 433 | 2 | 434 | 1 | deficient, prime |
| 434 | 1, 2, 7, 14, 31, 62, 217, 434 | 8 | 768 | 334 | deficient, composite |
| 435 | 1, 3, 5, 15, 29, 87, 145, 435 | 8 | 720 | 285 | deficient, composite |
| 436 | 1, 2, 4, 109, 218, 436 | 6 | 770 | 334 | deficient, composite |
| 437 | 1, 19, 23, 437 | 4 | 480 | 43 | deficient, composite |
| 438 | 1, 2, 3, 6, 73, 146, 219, 438 | 8 | 888 | 450 | abundant, composite |
| 439 | 1, 439 | 2 | 440 | 1 | deficient, prime |
| 440 | 1, 2, 4, 5, 8, 10, 11, 20, 22, 40, 44, 55, 88, 110, 220, 440 | 16 | 1080 | 640 | abundant, composite |
| 441 | 1, 3, 7, 9, 21, 49, 63, 147, 441 | 9 | 741 | 300 | deficient, composite |
| 442 | 1, 2, 13, 17, 26, 34, 221, 442 | 8 | 756 | 314 | deficient, composite |
| 443 | 1, 443 | 2 | 444 | 1 | deficient, prime |
| 444 | 1, 2, 3, 4, 6, 12, 37, 74, 111, 148, 222, 444 | 12 | 1064 | 620 | abundant, composite |
| 445 | 1, 5, 89, 445 | 4 | 540 | 95 | deficient, composite |
| 446 | 1, 2, 223, 446 | 4 | 672 | 226 | deficient, composite |
| 447 | 1, 3, 149, 447 | 4 | 600 | 153 | deficient, composite |
| 448 | 1, 2, 4, 7, 8, 14, 16, 28, 32, 56, 64, 112, 224, 448 | 14 | 1016 | 568 | abundant, composite |
| 449 | 1, 449 | 2 | 450 | 1 | deficient, prime |
| 450 | 1, 2, 3, 5, 6, 9, 10, 15, 18, 25, 30, 45, 50, 75, 90, 150, 225, 450 | 18 | 1209 | 759 | abundant, composite |
| 451 | 1, 11, 41, 451 | 4 | 504 | 53 | deficient, composite |
| 452 | 1, 2, 4, 113, 226, 452 | 6 | 798 | 346 | deficient, composite |
| 453 | 1, 3, 151, 453 | 4 | 608 | 155 | deficient, composite |
| 454 | 1, 2, 227, 454 | 4 | 684 | 230 | deficient, composite |
| 455 | 1, 5, 7, 13, 35, 65, 91, 455 | 8 | 672 | 217 | deficient, composite |
| 456 | 1, 2, 3, 4, 6, 8, 12, 19, 24, 38, 57, 76, 114, 152, 228, 456 | 16 | 1200 | 744 | abundant, composite |
| 457 | 1, 457 | 2 | 458 | 1 | deficient, prime |
| 458 | 1, 2, 229, 458 | 4 | 690 | 232 | deficient, composite |
| 459 | 1, 3, 9, 17, 27, 51, 153, 459 | 8 | 720 | 261 | deficient, composite |
| 460 | 1, 2, 4, 5, 10, 20, 23, 46, 92, 115, 230, 460 | 12 | 1008 | 548 | abundant, composite |
| 461 | 1, 461 | 2 | 462 | 1 | deficient, prime |
| 462 | 1, 2, 3, 6, 7, 11, 14, 21, 22, 33, 42, 66, 77, 154, 231, 462 | 16 | 1152 | 690 | abundant, composite |
| 463 | 1, 463 | 2 | 464 | 1 | deficient, prime |
| 464 | 1, 2, 4, 8, 16, 29, 58, 116, 232, 464 | 10 | 930 | 466 | abundant, composite, primitive abundant |
| 465 | 1, 3, 5, 15, 31, 93, 155, 465 | 8 | 768 | 303 | deficient, composite |
| 466 | 1, 2, 233, 466 | 4 | 702 | 236 | deficient, composite |
| 467 | 1, 467 | 2 | 468 | 1 | deficient, prime |
| 468 | 1, 2, 3, 4, 6, 9, 12, 13, 18, 26, 36, 39, 52, 78, 117, 156, 234, 468 | 18 | 1274 | 806 | abundant, composite |
| 469 | 1, 7, 67, 469 | 4 | 544 | 75 | deficient, composite |
| 470 | 1, 2, 5, 10, 47, 94, 235, 470 | 8 | 864 | 394 | deficient, composite |
| 471 | 1, 3, 157, 471 | 4 | 632 | 161 | deficient, composite |
| 472 | 1, 2, 4, 8, 59, 118, 236, 472 | 8 | 900 | 428 | deficient, composite |
| 473 | 1, 11, 43, 473 | 4 | 528 | 55 | deficient, composite |
| 474 | 1, 2, 3, 6, 79, 158, 237, 474 | 8 | 960 | 486 | abundant, composite |
| 475 | 1, 5, 19, 25, 95, 475 | 6 | 620 | 145 | deficient, composite |
| 476 | 1, 2, 4, 7, 14, 17, 28, 34, 68, 119, 238, 476 | 12 | 1008 | 532 | abundant, composite |
| 477 | 1, 3, 9, 53, 159, 477 | 6 | 702 | 225 | deficient, composite |
| 478 | 1, 2, 239, 478 | 4 | 720 | 242 | deficient, composite |
| 479 | 1, 479 | 2 | 480 | 1 | deficient, prime |
| 480 | 1, 2, 3, 4, 5, 6, 8, 10, 12, 15, 16, 20, 24, 30, 32, 40, 48, 60, 80, 96, 120, 160, 240, 480 | 24 | 1512 | 1032 | abundant, highly abundant, composite |
| 481 | 1, 13, 37, 481 | 4 | 532 | 51 | deficient, composite |
| 482 | 1, 2, 241, 482 | 4 | 726 | 244 | deficient, composite |
| 483 | 1, 3, 7, 21, 23, 69, 161, 483 | 8 | 768 | 285 | deficient, composite |
| 484 | 1, 2, 4, 11, 22, 44, 121, 242, 484 | 9 | 931 | 447 | deficient, composite |
| 485 | 1, 5, 97, 485 | 4 | 588 | 103 | deficient, composite |
| 486 | 1, 2, 3, 6, 9, 18, 27, 54, 81, 162, 243, 486 | 12 | 1092 | 606 | abundant, composite |
| 487 | 1, 487 | 2 | 488 | 1 | deficient, prime |
| 488 | 1, 2, 4, 8, 61, 122, 244, 488 | 8 | 930 | 442 | deficient, composite |
| 489 | 1, 3, 163, 489 | 4 | 656 | 167 | deficient, composite |
| 490 | 1, 2, 5, 7, 10, 14, 35, 49, 70, 98, 245, 490 | 12 | 1026 | 536 | abundant, composite |
| 491 | 1, 491 | 2 | 492 | 1 | deficient, prime |
| 492 | 1, 2, 3, 4, 6, 12, 41, 82, 123, 164, 246, 492 | 12 | 1176 | 684 | abundant, composite |
| 493 | 1, 17, 29, 493 | 4 | 540 | 47 | deficient, composite |
| 494 | 1, 2, 13, 19, 26, 38, 247, 494 | 8 | 840 | 346 | deficient, composite |
| 495 | 1, 3, 5, 9, 11, 15, 33, 45, 55, 99, 165, 495 | 12 | 936 | 441 | deficient, composite |
| 496 | 1, 2, 4, 8, 16, 31, 62, 124, 248, 496 | 10 | 992 | 496 | perfect, composite |
| 497 | 1, 7, 71, 497 | 4 | 576 | 79 | deficient, composite |
| 498 | 1, 2, 3, 6, 83, 166, 249, 498 | 8 | 1008 | 510 | abundant, composite |
| 499 | 1, 499 | 2 | 500 | 1 | deficient, prime |
| 500 | 1, 2, 4, 5, 10, 20, 25, 50, 100, 125, 250, 500 | 12 | 1092 | 592 | abundant, composite |
| 501 | 1, 3, 167, 501 | 4 | 672 | 171 | deficient, composite |
| 502 | 1, 2, 251, 502 | 4 | 756 | 254 | deficient, composite |
| 503 | 1, 503 | 2 | 504 | 1 | deficient, prime |
| 504 | 1, 2, 3, 4, 6, 7, 8, 9, 12, 14, 18, 21, 24, 28, 36, 42, 56, 63, 72, 84, 126, 168, 252, 504 | 24 | 1560 | 1056 | abundant, highly abundant, composite |
| 505 | 1, 5, 101, 505 | 4 | 612 | 107 | deficient, composite |
| 506 | 1, 2, 11, 22, 23, 46, 253, 506 | 8 | 864 | 358 | deficient, composite |
| 507 | 1, 3, 13, 39, 169, 507 | 6 | 732 | 225 | deficient, composite |
| 508 | 1, 2, 4, 127, 254, 508 | 6 | 896 | 388 | deficient, composite |
| 509 | 1, 509 | 2 | 510 | 1 | deficient, prime |
| 510 | 1, 2, 3, 5, 6, 10, 15, 17, 30, 34, 51, 85, 102, 170, 255, 510 | 16 | 1296 | 786 | abundant, composite |
| 511 | 1, 7, 73, 511 | 4 | 592 | 81 | deficient, composite |
| 512 | 1, 2, 4, 8, 16, 32, 64, 128, 256, 512 | 10 | 1023 | 511 | deficient, composite |
| 513 | 1, 3, 9, 19, 27, 57, 171, 513 | 8 | 800 | 287 | deficient, composite |
| 514 | 1, 2, 257, 514 | 4 | 774 | 260 | deficient, composite |
| 515 | 1, 5, 103, 515 | 4 | 624 | 109 | deficient, composite |
| 516 | 1, 2, 3, 4, 6, 12, 43, 86, 129, 172, 258, 516 | 12 | 1232 | 716 | abundant, composite |
| 517 | 1, 11, 47, 517 | 4 | 576 | 59 | deficient, composite |
| 518 | 1, 2, 7, 14, 37, 74, 259, 518 | 8 | 912 | 394 | deficient, composite |
| 519 | 1, 3, 173, 519 | 4 | 696 | 177 | deficient, composite |
| 520 | 1, 2, 4, 5, 8, 10, 13, 20, 26, 40, 52, 65, 104, 130, 260, 520 | 16 | 1260 | 740 | abundant, composite |
| 521 | 1, 521 | 2 | 522 | 1 | deficient, prime |
| 522 | 1, 2, 3, 6, 9, 18, 29, 58, 87, 174, 261, 522 | 12 | 1170 | 648 | abundant, composite |
| 523 | 1, 523 | 2 | 524 | 1 | deficient, prime |
| 524 | 1, 2, 4, 131, 262, 524 | 6 | 924 | 400 | deficient, composite |
| 525 | 1, 3, 5, 7, 15, 21, 25, 35, 75, 105, 175, 525 | 12 | 992 | 467 | deficient, composite |
| 526 | 1, 2, 263, 526 | 4 | 792 | 266 | deficient, composite |
| 527 | 1, 17, 31, 527 | 4 | 576 | 49 | deficient, composite |
| 528 | 1, 2, 3, 4, 6, 8, 11, 12, 16, 22, 24, 33, 44, 48, 66, 88, 132, 176, 264, 528 | 20 | 1488 | 960 | abundant, composite |
| 529 | 1, 23, 529 | 3 | 553 | 24 | deficient, composite |
| 530 | 1, 2, 5, 10, 53, 106, 265, 530 | 8 | 972 | 442 | deficient, composite |
| 531 | 1, 3, 9, 59, 177, 531 | 6 | 780 | 249 | deficient, composite |
| 532 | 1, 2, 4, 7, 14, 19, 28, 38, 76, 133, 266, 532 | 12 | 1120 | 588 | abundant, composite |
| 533 | 1, 13, 41, 533 | 4 | 588 | 55 | deficient, composite |
| 534 | 1, 2, 3, 6, 89, 178, 267, 534 | 8 | 1080 | 546 | abundant, composite |
| 535 | 1, 5, 107, 535 | 4 | 648 | 113 | deficient, composite |
| 536 | 1, 2, 4, 8, 67, 134, 268, 536 | 8 | 1020 | 484 | deficient, composite |
| 537 | 1, 3, 179, 537 | 4 | 720 | 183 | deficient, composite |
| 538 | 1, 2, 269, 538 | 4 | 810 | 272 | deficient, composite |
| 539 | 1, 7, 11, 49, 77, 539 | 6 | 684 | 145 | deficient, composite |
| 540 | 1, 2, 3, 4, 5, 6, 9, 10, 12, 15, 18, 20, 27, 30, 36, 45, 54, 60, 90, 108, 135, 180, 270, 540 | 24 | 1680 | 1140 | abundant, highly abundant, composite |
| 541 | 1, 541 | 2 | 542 | 1 | deficient, prime |
| 542 | 1, 2, 271, 542 | 4 | 816 | 274 | deficient, composite |
| 543 | 1, 3, 181, 543 | 4 | 728 | 185 | deficient, composite |
| 544 | 1, 2, 4, 8, 16, 17, 32, 34, 68, 136, 272, 544 | 12 | 1134 | 590 | abundant, composite |
| 545 | 1, 5, 109, 545 | 4 | 660 | 115 | deficient, composite |
| 546 | 1, 2, 3, 6, 7, 13, 14, 21, 26, 39, 42, 78, 91, 182, 273, 546 | 16 | 1344 | 798 | abundant, composite |
| 547 | 1, 547 | 2 | 548 | 1 | deficient, prime |
| 548 | 1, 2, 4, 137, 274, 548 | 6 | 966 | 418 | deficient, composite |
| 549 | 1, 3, 9, 61, 183, 549 | 6 | 806 | 257 | deficient, composite |
| 550 | 1, 2, 5, 10, 11, 22, 25, 50, 55, 110, 275, 550 | 12 | 1116 | 566 | abundant, composite, primitive abundant |
| 551 | 1, 19, 29, 551 | 4 | 600 | 49 | deficient, composite |
| 552 | 1, 2, 3, 4, 6, 8, 12, 23, 24, 46, 69, 92, 138, 184, 276, 552 | 16 | 1440 | 888 | abundant, composite |
| 553 | 1, 7, 79, 553 | 4 | 640 | 87 | deficient, composite |
| 554 | 1, 2, 277, 554 | 4 | 834 | 280 | deficient, composite |
| 555 | 1, 3, 5, 15, 37, 111, 185, 555 | 8 | 912 | 357 | deficient, composite |
| 556 | 1, 2, 4, 139, 278, 556 | 6 | 980 | 424 | deficient, composite |
| 557 | 1, 557 | 2 | 558 | 1 | deficient, prime |
| 558 | 1, 2, 3, 6, 9, 18, 31, 62, 93, 186, 279, 558 | 12 | 1248 | 690 | abundant, composite |
| 559 | 1, 13, 43, 559 | 4 | 616 | 57 | deficient, composite |
| 560 | 1, 2, 4, 5, 7, 8, 10, 14, 16, 20, 28, 35, 40, 56, 70, 80, 112, 140, 280, 560 | 20 | 1488 | 928 | abundant, composite |
| 561 | 1, 3, 11, 17, 33, 51, 187, 561 | 8 | 864 | 303 | deficient, composite |
| 562 | 1, 2, 281, 562 | 4 | 846 | 284 | deficient, composite |
| 563 | 1, 563 | 2 | 564 | 1 | deficient, prime |
| 564 | 1, 2, 3, 4, 6, 12, 47, 94, 141, 188, 282, 564 | 12 | 1344 | 780 | abundant, composite |
| 565 | 1, 5, 113, 565 | 4 | 684 | 119 | deficient, composite |
| 566 | 1, 2, 283, 566 | 4 | 852 | 286 | deficient, composite |
| 567 | 1, 3, 7, 9, 21, 27, 63, 81, 189, 567 | 10 | 968 | 401 | deficient, composite |
| 568 | 1, 2, 4, 8, 71, 142, 284, 568 | 8 | 1080 | 512 | deficient, composite |
| 569 | 1, 569 | 2 | 570 | 1 | deficient, prime |
| 570 | 1, 2, 3, 5, 6, 10, 15, 19, 30, 38, 57, 95, 114, 190, 285, 570 | 16 | 1440 | 870 | abundant, composite |
| 571 | 1, 571 | 2 | 572 | 1 | deficient, prime |
| 572 | 1, 2, 4, 11, 13, 22, 26, 44, 52, 143, 286, 572 | 12 | 1176 | 604 | abundant, composite, primitive abundant |
| 573 | 1, 3, 191, 573 | 4 | 768 | 195 | deficient, composite |
| 574 | 1, 2, 7, 14, 41, 82, 287, 574 | 8 | 1008 | 434 | deficient, composite |
| 575 | 1, 5, 23, 25, 115, 575 | 6 | 744 | 169 | deficient, composite |
| 576 | 1, 2, 3, 4, 6, 8, 9, 12, 16, 18, 24, 32, 36, 48, 64, 72, 96, 144, 192, 288, 576 | 21 | 1651 | 1075 | abundant, composite |
| 577 | 1, 577 | 2 | 578 | 1 | deficient, prime |
| 578 | 1, 2, 17, 34, 289, 578 | 6 | 921 | 343 | deficient, composite |
| 579 | 1, 3, 193, 579 | 4 | 776 | 197 | deficient, composite |
| 580 | 1, 2, 4, 5, 10, 20, 29, 58, 116, 145, 290, 580 | 12 | 1260 | 680 | abundant, composite |
| 581 | 1, 7, 83, 581 | 4 | 672 | 91 | deficient, composite |
| 582 | 1, 2, 3, 6, 97, 194, 291, 582 | 8 | 1176 | 594 | abundant, composite |
| 583 | 1, 11, 53, 583 | 4 | 648 | 65 | deficient, composite |
| 584 | 1, 2, 4, 8, 73, 146, 292, 584 | 8 | 1110 | 526 | deficient, composite |
| 585 | 1, 3, 5, 9, 13, 15, 39, 45, 65, 117, 195, 585 | 12 | 1092 | 507 | deficient, composite |
| 586 | 1, 2, 293, 586 | 4 | 882 | 296 | deficient, composite |
| 587 | 1, 587 | 2 | 588 | 1 | deficient, prime |
| 588 | 1, 2, 3, 4, 6, 7, 12, 14, 21, 28, 42, 49, 84, 98, 147, 196, 294, 588 | 18 | 1596 | 1008 | abundant, composite |
| 589 | 1, 19, 31, 589 | 4 | 640 | 51 | deficient, composite |
| 590 | 1, 2, 5, 10, 59, 118, 295, 590 | 8 | 1080 | 490 | deficient, composite |
| 591 | 1, 3, 197, 591 | 4 | 792 | 201 | deficient, composite |
| 592 | 1, 2, 4, 8, 16, 37, 74, 148, 296, 592 | 10 | 1178 | 586 | deficient, composite |
| 593 | 1, 593 | 2 | 594 | 1 | deficient, prime |
| 594 | 1, 2, 3, 6, 9, 11, 18, 22, 27, 33, 54, 66, 99, 198, 297, 594 | 16 | 1440 | 846 | abundant, composite |
| 595 | 1, 5, 7, 17, 35, 85, 119, 595 | 8 | 864 | 269 | deficient, composite |
| 596 | 1, 2, 4, 149, 298, 596 | 6 | 1050 | 454 | deficient, composite |
| 597 | 1, 3, 199, 597 | 4 | 800 | 203 | deficient, composite |
| 598 | 1, 2, 13, 23, 26, 46, 299, 598 | 8 | 1008 | 410 | deficient, composite |
| 599 | 1, 599 | 2 | 600 | 1 | deficient, prime |
| 600 | 1, 2, 3, 4, 5, 6, 8, 10, 12, 15, 20, 24, 25, 30, 40, 50, 60, 75, 100, 120, 150, 200, 300, 600 | 24 | 1860 | 1260 | abundant, highly abundant, composite |
| 601 | 1, 601 | 2 | 602 | 1 | deficient, prime |
| 602 | 1, 2, 7, 14, 43, 86, 301, 602 | 8 | 1056 | 454 | deficient, composite |
| 603 | 1, 3, 9, 67, 201, 603 | 6 | 884 | 281 | deficient, composite |
| 604 | 1, 2, 4, 151, 302, 604 | 6 | 1064 | 460 | deficient, composite |
| 605 | 1, 5, 11, 55, 121, 605 | 6 | 798 | 193 | deficient, composite |
| 606 | 1, 2, 3, 6, 101, 202, 303, 606 | 8 | 1224 | 618 | abundant, composite |
| 607 | 1, 607 | 2 | 608 | 1 | deficient, prime |
| 608 | 1, 2, 4, 8, 16, 19, 32, 38, 76, 152, 304, 608 | 12 | 1260 | 652 | abundant, composite |
| 609 | 1, 3, 7, 21, 29, 87, 203, 609 | 8 | 960 | 351 | deficient, composite |
| 610 | 1, 2, 5, 10, 61, 122, 305, 610 | 8 | 1116 | 506 | deficient, composite |
| 611 | 1, 13, 47, 611 | 4 | 672 | 61 | deficient, composite |
| 612 | 1, 2, 3, 4, 6, 9, 12, 17, 18, 34, 36, 51, 68, 102, 153, 204, 306, 612 | 18 | 1638 | 1026 | abundant, composite |
| 613 | 1, 613 | 2 | 614 | 1 | deficient, prime |
| 614 | 1, 2, 307, 614 | 4 | 924 | 310 | deficient, composite |
| 615 | 1, 3, 5, 15, 41, 123, 205, 615 | 8 | 1008 | 393 | deficient, composite |
| 616 | 1, 2, 4, 7, 8, 11, 14, 22, 28, 44, 56, 77, 88, 154, 308, 616 | 16 | 1440 | 824 | abundant, composite |
| 617 | 1, 617 | 2 | 618 | 1 | deficient, prime |
| 618 | 1, 2, 3, 6, 103, 206, 309, 618 | 8 | 1248 | 630 | abundant, composite |
| 619 | 1, 619 | 2 | 620 | 1 | deficient, prime |
| 620 | 1, 2, 4, 5, 10, 20, 31, 62, 124, 155, 310, 620 | 12 | 1344 | 724 | abundant, composite |
| 621 | 1, 3, 9, 23, 27, 69, 207, 621 | 8 | 960 | 339 | deficient, composite |
| 622 | 1, 2, 311, 622 | 4 | 936 | 314 | deficient, composite |
| 623 | 1, 7, 89, 623 | 4 | 720 | 97 | deficient, composite |
| 624 | 1, 2, 3, 4, 6, 8, 12, 13, 16, 24, 26, 39, 48, 52, 78, 104, 156, 208, 312, 624 | 20 | 1736 | 1112 | abundant, composite |
| 625 | 1, 5, 25, 125, 625 | 5 | 781 | 156 | deficient, composite |
| 626 | 1, 2, 313, 626 | 4 | 942 | 316 | deficient, composite |
| 627 | 1, 3, 11, 19, 33, 57, 209, 627 | 8 | 960 | 333 | deficient, composite |
| 628 | 1, 2, 4, 157, 314, 628 | 6 | 1106 | 478 | deficient, composite |
| 629 | 1, 17, 37, 629 | 4 | 684 | 55 | deficient, composite |
| 630 | 1, 2, 3, 5, 6, 7, 9, 10, 14, 15, 18, 21, 30, 35, 42, 45, 63, 70, 90, 105, 126, 210, 315, 630 | 24 | 1872 | 1242 | abundant, highly abundant, composite |
| 631 | 1, 631 | 2 | 632 | 1 | deficient, prime |
| 632 | 1, 2, 4, 8, 79, 158, 316, 632 | 8 | 1200 | 568 | deficient, composite |
| 633 | 1, 3, 211, 633 | 4 | 848 | 215 | deficient, composite |
| 634 | 1, 2, 317, 634 | 4 | 954 | 320 | deficient, composite |
| 635 | 1, 5, 127, 635 | 4 | 768 | 133 | deficient, composite |
| 636 | 1, 2, 3, 4, 6, 12, 53, 106, 159, 212, 318, 636 | 12 | 1512 | 876 | abundant, composite |
| 637 | 1, 7, 13, 49, 91, 637 | 6 | 798 | 161 | deficient, composite |
| 638 | 1, 2, 11, 22, 29, 58, 319, 638 | 8 | 1080 | 442 | deficient, composite |
| 639 | 1, 3, 9, 71, 213, 639 | 6 | 936 | 297 | deficient, composite |
| 640 | 1, 2, 4, 5, 8, 10, 16, 20, 32, 40, 64, 80, 128, 160, 320, 640 | 16 | 1530 | 890 | abundant, composite |
| 641 | 1, 641 | 2 | 642 | 1 | deficient, prime |
| 642 | 1, 2, 3, 6, 107, 214, 321, 642 | 8 | 1296 | 654 | abundant, composite |
| 643 | 1, 643 | 2 | 644 | 1 | deficient, prime |
| 644 | 1, 2, 4, 7, 14, 23, 28, 46, 92, 161, 322, 644 | 12 | 1344 | 700 | abundant, composite |
| 645 | 1, 3, 5, 15, 43, 129, 215, 645 | 8 | 1056 | 411 | deficient, composite |
| 646 | 1, 2, 17, 19, 34, 38, 323, 646 | 8 | 1080 | 434 | deficient, composite |
| 647 | 1, 647 | 2 | 648 | 1 | deficient, prime |
| 648 | 1, 2, 3, 4, 6, 8, 9, 12, 18, 24, 27, 36, 54, 72, 81, 108, 162, 216, 324, 648 | 20 | 1815 | 1167 | abundant, composite |
| 649 | 1, 11, 59, 649 | 4 | 720 | 71 | deficient, composite |
| 650 | 1, 2, 5, 10, 13, 25, 26, 50, 65, 130, 325, 650 | 12 | 1302 | 652 | abundant, composite, primitive abundant |
| 651 | 1, 3, 7, 21, 31, 93, 217, 651 | 8 | 1024 | 373 | deficient, composite |
| 652 | 1, 2, 4, 163, 326, 652 | 6 | 1148 | 496 | deficient, composite |
| 653 | 1, 653 | 2 | 654 | 1 | deficient, prime |
| 654 | 1, 2, 3, 6, 109, 218, 327, 654 | 8 | 1320 | 666 | abundant, composite |
| 655 | 1, 5, 131, 655 | 4 | 792 | 137 | deficient, composite |
| 656 | 1, 2, 4, 8, 16, 41, 82, 164, 328, 656 | 10 | 1302 | 646 | deficient, composite |
| 657 | 1, 3, 9, 73, 219, 657 | 6 | 962 | 305 | deficient, composite |
| 658 | 1, 2, 7, 14, 47, 94, 329, 658 | 8 | 1152 | 494 | deficient, composite |
| 659 | 1, 659 | 2 | 660 | 1 | deficient, prime |
| 660 | 1, 2, 3, 4, 5, 6, 10, 11, 12, 15, 20, 22, 30, 33, 44, 55, 60, 66, 110, 132, 165, 220, 330, 660 | 24 | 2016 | 1356 | abundant, highly abundant, composite |
| 661 | 1, 661 | 2 | 662 | 1 | deficient, prime |
| 662 | 1, 2, 331, 662 | 4 | 996 | 334 | deficient, composite |
| 663 | 1, 3, 13, 17, 39, 51, 221, 663 | 8 | 1008 | 345 | deficient, composite |
| 664 | 1, 2, 4, 8, 83, 166, 332, 664 | 8 | 1260 | 596 | deficient, composite |
| 665 | 1, 5, 7, 19, 35, 95, 133, 665 | 8 | 960 | 295 | deficient, composite |
| 666 | 1, 2, 3, 6, 9, 18, 37, 74, 111, 222, 333, 666 | 12 | 1482 | 816 | abundant, composite |
| 667 | 1, 23, 29, 667 | 4 | 720 | 53 | deficient, composite |
| 668 | 1, 2, 4, 167, 334, 668 | 6 | 1176 | 508 | deficient, composite |
| 669 | 1, 3, 223, 669 | 4 | 896 | 227 | deficient, composite |
| 670 | 1, 2, 5, 10, 67, 134, 335, 670 | 8 | 1224 | 554 | deficient, composite |
| 671 | 1, 11, 61, 671 | 4 | 744 | 73 | deficient, composite |
| 672 | 1, 2, 3, 4, 6, 7, 8, 12, 14, 16, 21, 24, 28, 32, 42, 48, 56, 84, 96, 112, 168, 224, 336, 672 | 24 | 2016 | 1344 | abundant, composite |
| 673 | 1, 673 | 2 | 674 | 1 | deficient, prime |
| 674 | 1, 2, 337, 674 | 4 | 1014 | 340 | deficient, composite |
| 675 | 1, 3, 5, 9, 15, 25, 27, 45, 75, 135, 225, 675 | 12 | 1240 | 565 | deficient, composite |
| 676 | 1, 2, 4, 13, 26, 52, 169, 338, 676 | 9 | 1281 | 605 | deficient, composite |
| 677 | 1, 677 | 2 | 678 | 1 | deficient, prime |
| 678 | 1, 2, 3, 6, 113, 226, 339, 678 | 8 | 1368 | 690 | abundant, composite |
| 679 | 1, 7, 97, 679 | 4 | 784 | 105 | deficient, composite |
| 680 | 1, 2, 4, 5, 8, 10, 17, 20, 34, 40, 68, 85, 136, 170, 340, 680 | 16 | 1620 | 940 | abundant, composite |
| 681 | 1, 3, 227, 681 | 4 | 912 | 231 | deficient, composite |
| 682 | 1, 2, 11, 22, 31, 62, 341, 682 | 8 | 1152 | 470 | deficient, composite |
| 683 | 1, 683 | 2 | 684 | 1 | deficient, prime |
| 684 | 1, 2, 3, 4, 6, 9, 12, 18, 19, 36, 38, 57, 76, 114, 171, 228, 342, 684 | 18 | 1820 | 1136 | abundant, composite |
| 685 | 1, 5, 137, 685 | 4 | 828 | 143 | deficient, composite |
| 686 | 1, 2, 7, 14, 49, 98, 343, 686 | 8 | 1200 | 514 | deficient, composite |
| 687 | 1, 3, 229, 687 | 4 | 920 | 233 | deficient, composite |
| 688 | 1, 2, 4, 8, 16, 43, 86, 172, 344, 688 | 10 | 1364 | 676 | deficient, composite |
| 689 | 1, 13, 53, 689 | 4 | 756 | 67 | deficient, composite |
| 690 | 1, 2, 3, 5, 6, 10, 15, 23, 30, 46, 69, 115, 138, 230, 345, 690 | 16 | 1728 | 1038 | abundant, composite |
| 691 | 1, 691 | 2 | 692 | 1 | deficient, prime |
| 692 | 1, 2, 4, 173, 346, 692 | 6 | 1218 | 526 | deficient, composite |
| 693 | 1, 3, 7, 9, 11, 21, 33, 63, 77, 99, 231, 693 | 12 | 1248 | 555 | deficient, composite |
| 694 | 1, 2, 347, 694 | 4 | 1044 | 350 | deficient, composite |
| 695 | 1, 5, 139, 695 | 4 | 840 | 145 | deficient, composite |
| 696 | 1, 2, 3, 4, 6, 8, 12, 24, 29, 58, 87, 116, 174, 232, 348, 696 | 16 | 1800 | 1104 | abundant, composite |
| 697 | 1, 17, 41, 697 | 4 | 756 | 59 | deficient, composite |
| 698 | 1, 2, 349, 698 | 4 | 1050 | 352 | deficient, composite |
| 699 | 1, 3, 233, 699 | 4 | 936 | 237 | deficient, composite |
| 700 | 1, 2, 4, 5, 7, 10, 14, 20, 25, 28, 35, 50, 70, 100, 140, 175, 350, 700 | 18 | 1736 | 1036 | abundant, composite |
| 701 | 1, 701 | 2 | 702 | 1 | deficient, prime |
| 702 | 1, 2, 3, 6, 9, 13, 18, 26, 27, 39, 54, 78, 117, 234, 351, 702 | 16 | 1680 | 978 | abundant, composite |
| 703 | 1, 19, 37, 703 | 4 | 760 | 57 | deficient, composite |
| 704 | 1, 2, 4, 8, 11, 16, 22, 32, 44, 64, 88, 176, 352, 704 | 14 | 1524 | 820 | abundant, composite |
| 705 | 1, 3, 5, 15, 47, 141, 235, 705 | 8 | 1152 | 447 | deficient, composite |
| 706 | 1, 2, 353, 706 | 4 | 1062 | 356 | deficient, composite |
| 707 | 1, 7, 101, 707 | 4 | 816 | 109 | deficient, composite |
| 708 | 1, 2, 3, 4, 6, 12, 59, 118, 177, 236, 354, 708 | 12 | 1680 | 972 | abundant, composite |
| 709 | 1, 709 | 2 | 710 | 1 | deficient, prime |
| 710 | 1, 2, 5, 10, 71, 142, 355, 710 | 8 | 1296 | 586 | deficient, composite |
| 711 | 1, 3, 9, 79, 237, 711 | 6 | 1040 | 329 | deficient, composite |
| 712 | 1, 2, 4, 8, 89, 178, 356, 712 | 8 | 1350 | 638 | deficient, composite |
| 713 | 1, 23, 31, 713 | 4 | 768 | 55 | deficient, composite |
| 714 | 1, 2, 3, 6, 7, 14, 17, 21, 34, 42, 51, 102, 119, 238, 357, 714 | 16 | 1728 | 1014 | abundant, composite |
| 715 | 1, 5, 11, 13, 55, 65, 143, 715 | 8 | 1008 | 293 | deficient, composite |
| 716 | 1, 2, 4, 179, 358, 716 | 6 | 1260 | 544 | deficient, composite |
| 717 | 1, 3, 239, 717 | 4 | 960 | 243 | deficient, composite |
| 718 | 1, 2, 359, 718 | 4 | 1080 | 362 | deficient, composite |
| 719 | 1, 719 | 2 | 720 | 1 | deficient, prime |
| 720 | 1, 2, 3, 4, 5, 6, 8, 9, 10, 12, 15, 16, 18, 20, 24, 30, 36, 40, 45, 48, 60, 72, 80, 90, 120, 144, 180, 240, 360, 720 | 30 | 2418 | 1698 | abundant, highly abundant, composite, highly composite |
| 721 | 1, 7, 103, 721 | 4 | 832 | 111 | deficient, composite |
| 722 | 1, 2, 19, 38, 361, 722 | 6 | 1143 | 421 | deficient, composite |
| 723 | 1, 3, 241, 723 | 4 | 968 | 245 | deficient, composite |
| 724 | 1, 2, 4, 181, 362, 724 | 6 | 1274 | 550 | deficient, composite |
| 725 | 1, 5, 25, 29, 145, 725 | 6 | 930 | 205 | deficient, composite |
| 726 | 1, 2, 3, 6, 11, 22, 33, 66, 121, 242, 363, 726 | 12 | 1596 | 870 | abundant, composite |
| 727 | 1, 727 | 2 | 728 | 1 | deficient, prime |
| 728 | 1, 2, 4, 7, 8, 13, 14, 26, 28, 52, 56, 91, 104, 182, 364, 728 | 16 | 1680 | 952 | abundant, composite |
| 729 | 1, 3, 9, 27, 81, 243, 729 | 7 | 1093 | 364 | deficient, composite |
| 730 | 1, 2, 5, 10, 73, 146, 365, 730 | 8 | 1332 | 602 | deficient, composite |
| 731 | 1, 17, 43, 731 | 4 | 792 | 61 | deficient, composite |
| 732 | 1, 2, 3, 4, 6, 12, 61, 122, 183, 244, 366, 732 | 12 | 1736 | 1004 | abundant, composite |
| 733 | 1, 733 | 2 | 734 | 1 | deficient, prime |
| 734 | 1, 2, 367, 734 | 4 | 1104 | 370 | deficient, composite |
| 735 | 1, 3, 5, 7, 15, 21, 35, 49, 105, 147, 245, 735 | 12 | 1368 | 633 | deficient, composite |
| 736 | 1, 2, 4, 8, 16, 23, 32, 46, 92, 184, 368, 736 | 12 | 1512 | 776 | abundant, composite |
| 737 | 1, 11, 67, 737 | 4 | 816 | 79 | deficient, composite |
| 738 | 1, 2, 3, 6, 9, 18, 41, 82, 123, 246, 369, 738 | 12 | 1638 | 900 | abundant, composite |
| 739 | 1, 739 | 2 | 740 | 1 | deficient, prime |
| 740 | 1, 2, 4, 5, 10, 20, 37, 74, 148, 185, 370, 740 | 12 | 1596 | 856 | abundant, composite |
| 741 | 1, 3, 13, 19, 39, 57, 247, 741 | 8 | 1120 | 379 | deficient, composite |
| 742 | 1, 2, 7, 14, 53, 106, 371, 742 | 8 | 1296 | 554 | deficient, composite |
| 743 | 1, 743 | 2 | 744 | 1 | deficient, prime |
| 744 | 1, 2, 3, 4, 6, 8, 12, 24, 31, 62, 93, 124, 186, 248, 372, 744 | 16 | 1920 | 1176 | abundant, composite |
| 745 | 1, 5, 149, 745 | 4 | 900 | 155 | deficient, composite |
| 746 | 1, 2, 373, 746 | 4 | 1122 | 376 | deficient, composite |
| 747 | 1, 3, 9, 83, 249, 747 | 6 | 1092 | 345 | deficient, composite |
| 748 | 1, 2, 4, 11, 17, 22, 34, 44, 68, 187, 374, 748 | 12 | 1512 | 764 | abundant, composite, primitive abundant |
| 749 | 1, 7, 107, 749 | 4 | 864 | 115 | deficient, composite |
| 750 | 1, 2, 3, 5, 6, 10, 15, 25, 30, 50, 75, 125, 150, 250, 375, 750 | 16 | 1872 | 1122 | abundant, composite |
| 751 | 1, 751 | 2 | 752 | 1 | deficient, prime |
| 752 | 1, 2, 4, 8, 16, 47, 94, 188, 376, 752 | 10 | 1488 | 736 | deficient, composite |
| 753 | 1, 3, 251, 753 | 4 | 1008 | 255 | deficient, composite |
| 754 | 1, 2, 13, 26, 29, 58, 377, 754 | 8 | 1260 | 506 | deficient, composite |
| 755 | 1, 5, 151, 755 | 4 | 912 | 157 | deficient, composite |
| 756 | 1, 2, 3, 4, 6, 7, 9, 12, 14, 18, 21, 27, 28, 36, 42, 54, 63, 84, 108, 126, 189, 252, 378, 756 | 24 | 2240 | 1484 | abundant, composite |
| 757 | 1, 757 | 2 | 758 | 1 | deficient, prime |
| 758 | 1, 2, 379, 758 | 4 | 1140 | 382 | deficient, composite |
| 759 | 1, 3, 11, 23, 33, 69, 253, 759 | 8 | 1152 | 393 | deficient, composite |
| 760 | 1, 2, 4, 5, 8, 10, 19, 20, 38, 40, 76, 95, 152, 190, 380, 760 | 16 | 1800 | 1040 | abundant, composite |
| 761 | 1, 761 | 2 | 762 | 1 | deficient, prime |
| 762 | 1, 2, 3, 6, 127, 254, 381, 762 | 8 | 1536 | 774 | abundant, composite |
| 763 | 1, 7, 109, 763 | 4 | 880 | 117 | deficient, composite |
| 764 | 1, 2, 4, 191, 382, 764 | 6 | 1344 | 580 | deficient, composite |
| 765 | 1, 3, 5, 9, 15, 17, 45, 51, 85, 153, 255, 765 | 12 | 1404 | 639 | deficient, composite |
| 766 | 1, 2, 383, 766 | 4 | 1152 | 386 | deficient, composite |
| 767 | 1, 13, 59, 767 | 4 | 840 | 73 | deficient, composite |
| 768 | 1, 2, 3, 4, 6, 8, 12, 16, 24, 32, 48, 64, 96, 128, 192, 256, 384, 768 | 18 | 2044 | 1276 | abundant, composite |
| 769 | 1, 769 | 2 | 770 | 1 | deficient, prime |
| 770 | 1, 2, 5, 7, 10, 11, 14, 22, 35, 55, 70, 77, 110, 154, 385, 770 | 16 | 1728 | 958 | abundant, composite |
| 771 | 1, 3, 257, 771 | 4 | 1032 | 261 | deficient, composite |
| 772 | 1, 2, 4, 193, 386, 772 | 6 | 1358 | 586 | deficient, composite |
| 773 | 1, 773 | 2 | 774 | 1 | deficient, prime |
| 774 | 1, 2, 3, 6, 9, 18, 43, 86, 129, 258, 387, 774 | 12 | 1716 | 942 | abundant, composite |
| 775 | 1, 5, 25, 31, 155, 775 | 6 | 992 | 217 | deficient, composite |
| 776 | 1, 2, 4, 8, 97, 194, 388, 776 | 8 | 1470 | 694 | deficient, composite |
| 777 | 1, 3, 7, 21, 37, 111, 259, 777 | 8 | 1216 | 439 | deficient, composite |
| 778 | 1, 2, 389, 778 | 4 | 1170 | 392 | deficient, composite |
| 779 | 1, 19, 41, 779 | 4 | 840 | 61 | deficient, composite |
| 780 | 1, 2, 3, 4, 5, 6, 10, 12, 13, 15, 20, 26, 30, 39, 52, 60, 65, 78, 130, 156, 195, 260, 390, 780 | 24 | 2352 | 1572 | abundant, composite |
| 781 | 1, 11, 71, 781 | 4 | 864 | 83 | deficient, composite |
| 782 | 1, 2, 17, 23, 34, 46, 391, 782 | 8 | 1296 | 514 | deficient, composite |
| 783 | 1, 3, 9, 27, 29, 87, 261, 783 | 8 | 1200 | 417 | deficient, composite |
| 784 | 1, 2, 4, 7, 8, 14, 16, 28, 49, 56, 98, 112, 196, 392, 784 | 15 | 1767 | 983 | abundant, composite |
| 785 | 1, 5, 157, 785 | 4 | 948 | 163 | deficient, composite |
| 786 | 1, 2, 3, 6, 131, 262, 393, 786 | 8 | 1584 | 798 | abundant, composite |
| 787 | 1, 787 | 2 | 788 | 1 | deficient, prime |
| 788 | 1, 2, 4, 197, 394, 788 | 6 | 1386 | 598 | deficient, composite |
| 789 | 1, 3, 263, 789 | 4 | 1056 | 267 | deficient, composite |
| 790 | 1, 2, 5, 10, 79, 158, 395, 790 | 8 | 1440 | 650 | deficient, composite |
| 791 | 1, 7, 113, 791 | 4 | 912 | 121 | deficient, composite |
| 792 | 1, 2, 3, 4, 6, 8, 9, 11, 12, 18, 22, 24, 33, 36, 44, 66, 72, 88, 99, 132, 198, 264, 396, 792 | 24 | 2340 | 1548 | abundant, composite |
| 793 | 1, 13, 61, 793 | 4 | 868 | 75 | deficient, composite |
| 794 | 1, 2, 397, 794 | 4 | 1194 | 400 | deficient, composite |
| 795 | 1, 3, 5, 15, 53, 159, 265, 795 | 8 | 1296 | 501 | deficient, composite |
| 796 | 1, 2, 4, 199, 398, 796 | 6 | 1400 | 604 | deficient, composite |
| 797 | 1, 797 | 2 | 798 | 1 | deficient, prime |
| 798 | 1, 2, 3, 6, 7, 14, 19, 21, 38, 42, 57, 114, 133, 266, 399, 798 | 16 | 1920 | 1122 | abundant, composite |
| 799 | 1, 17, 47, 799 | 4 | 864 | 65 | deficient, composite |
| 800 | 1, 2, 4, 5, 8, 10, 16, 20, 25, 32, 40, 50, 80, 100, 160, 200, 400, 800 | 18 | 1953 | 1153 | abundant, composite |
| 801 | 1, 3, 9, 89, 267, 801 | 6 | 1170 | 369 | deficient, composite |
| 802 | 1, 2, 401, 802 | 4 | 1206 | 404 | deficient, composite |
| 803 | 1, 11, 73, 803 | 4 | 888 | 85 | deficient, composite |
| 804 | 1, 2, 3, 4, 6, 12, 67, 134, 201, 268, 402, 804 | 12 | 1904 | 1100 | abundant, composite |
| 805 | 1, 5, 7, 23, 35, 115, 161, 805 | 8 | 1152 | 347 | deficient, composite |
| 806 | 1, 2, 13, 26, 31, 62, 403, 806 | 8 | 1344 | 538 | deficient, composite |
| 807 | 1, 3, 269, 807 | 4 | 1080 | 273 | deficient, composite |
| 808 | 1, 2, 4, 8, 101, 202, 404, 808 | 8 | 1530 | 722 | deficient, composite |
| 809 | 1, 809 | 2 | 810 | 1 | deficient, prime |
| 810 | 1, 2, 3, 5, 6, 9, 10, 15, 18, 27, 30, 45, 54, 81, 90, 135, 162, 270, 405, 810 | 20 | 2178 | 1368 | abundant, composite |
| 811 | 1, 811 | 2 | 812 | 1 | deficient, prime |
| 812 | 1, 2, 4, 7, 14, 28, 29, 58, 116, 203, 406, 812 | 12 | 1680 | 868 | abundant, composite |
| 813 | 1, 3, 271, 813 | 4 | 1088 | 275 | deficient, composite |
| 814 | 1, 2, 11, 22, 37, 74, 407, 814 | 8 | 1368 | 554 | deficient, composite |
| 815 | 1, 5, 163, 815 | 4 | 984 | 169 | deficient, composite |
| 816 | 1, 2, 3, 4, 6, 8, 12, 16, 17, 24, 34, 48, 51, 68, 102, 136, 204, 272, 408, 816 | 20 | 2232 | 1416 | abundant, composite |
| 817 | 1, 19, 43, 817 | 4 | 880 | 63 | deficient, composite |
| 818 | 1, 2, 409, 818 | 4 | 1230 | 412 | deficient, composite |
| 819 | 1, 3, 7, 9, 13, 21, 39, 63, 91, 117, 273, 819 | 12 | 1456 | 637 | deficient, composite |
| 820 | 1, 2, 4, 5, 10, 20, 41, 82, 164, 205, 410, 820 | 12 | 1764 | 944 | abundant, composite |
| 821 | 1, 821 | 2 | 822 | 1 | deficient, prime |
| 822 | 1, 2, 3, 6, 137, 274, 411, 822 | 8 | 1656 | 834 | abundant, composite |
| 823 | 1, 823 | 2 | 824 | 1 | deficient, prime |
| 824 | 1, 2, 4, 8, 103, 206, 412, 824 | 8 | 1560 | 736 | deficient, composite |
| 825 | 1, 3, 5, 11, 15, 25, 33, 55, 75, 165, 275, 825 | 12 | 1488 | 663 | deficient, composite |
| 826 | 1, 2, 7, 14, 59, 118, 413, 826 | 8 | 1440 | 614 | deficient, composite |
| 827 | 1, 827 | 2 | 828 | 1 | deficient, prime |
| 828 | 1, 2, 3, 4, 6, 9, 12, 18, 23, 36, 46, 69, 92, 138, 207, 276, 414, 828 | 18 | 2184 | 1356 | abundant, composite |
| 829 | 1, 829 | 2 | 830 | 1 | deficient, prime |
| 830 | 1, 2, 5, 10, 83, 166, 415, 830 | 8 | 1512 | 682 | deficient, composite |
| 831 | 1, 3, 277, 831 | 4 | 1112 | 281 | deficient, composite |
| 832 | 1, 2, 4, 8, 13, 16, 26, 32, 52, 64, 104, 208, 416, 832 | 14 | 1778 | 946 | abundant, composite |
| 833 | 1, 7, 17, 49, 119, 833 | 6 | 1026 | 193 | deficient, composite |
| 834 | 1, 2, 3, 6, 139, 278, 417, 834 | 8 | 1680 | 846 | abundant, composite |
| 835 | 1, 5, 167, 835 | 4 | 1008 | 173 | deficient, composite |
| 836 | 1, 2, 4, 11, 19, 22, 38, 44, 76, 209, 418, 836 | 12 | 1680 | 844 | abundant, composite, primitive abundant, weird |
| 837 | 1, 3, 9, 27, 31, 93, 279, 837 | 8 | 1280 | 443 | deficient, composite |
| 838 | 1, 2, 419, 838 | 4 | 1260 | 422 | deficient, composite |
| 839 | 1, 839 | 2 | 840 | 1 | deficient, prime |
| 840 | 1, 2, 3, 4, 5, 6, 7, 8, 10, 12, 14, 15, 20, 21, 24, 28, 30, 35, 40, 42, 56, 60, 70, 84, 105, 120, 140, 168, 210, 280, 420, 840 | 32 | 2880 | 2040 | abundant, highly abundant, composite, highly composite |
| 841 | 1, 29, 841 | 3 | 871 | 30 | deficient, composite |
| 842 | 1, 2, 421, 842 | 4 | 1266 | 424 | deficient, composite |
| 843 | 1, 3, 281, 843 | 4 | 1128 | 285 | deficient, composite |
| 844 | 1, 2, 4, 211, 422, 844 | 6 | 1484 | 640 | deficient, composite |
| 845 | 1, 5, 13, 65, 169, 845 | 6 | 1098 | 253 | deficient, composite |
| 846 | 1, 2, 3, 6, 9, 18, 47, 94, 141, 282, 423, 846 | 12 | 1872 | 1026 | abundant, composite |
| 847 | 1, 7, 11, 77, 121, 847 | 6 | 1064 | 217 | deficient, composite |
| 848 | 1, 2, 4, 8, 16, 53, 106, 212, 424, 848 | 10 | 1674 | 826 | deficient, composite |
| 849 | 1, 3, 283, 849 | 4 | 1136 | 287 | deficient, composite |
| 850 | 1, 2, 5, 10, 17, 25, 34, 50, 85, 170, 425, 850 | 12 | 1674 | 824 | deficient, composite |
| 851 | 1, 23, 37, 851 | 4 | 912 | 61 | deficient, composite |
| 852 | 1, 2, 3, 4, 6, 12, 71, 142, 213, 284, 426, 852 | 12 | 2016 | 1164 | abundant, composite |
| 853 | 1, 853 | 2 | 854 | 1 | deficient, prime |
| 854 | 1, 2, 7, 14, 61, 122, 427, 854 | 8 | 1488 | 634 | deficient, composite |
| 855 | 1, 3, 5, 9, 15, 19, 45, 57, 95, 171, 285, 855 | 12 | 1560 | 705 | deficient, composite |
| 856 | 1, 2, 4, 8, 107, 214, 428, 856 | 8 | 1620 | 764 | deficient, composite |
| 857 | 1, 857 | 2 | 858 | 1 | deficient, prime |
| 858 | 1, 2, 3, 6, 11, 13, 22, 26, 33, 39, 66, 78, 143, 286, 429, 858 | 16 | 2016 | 1158 | abundant, composite |
| 859 | 1, 859 | 2 | 860 | 1 | deficient, prime |
| 860 | 1, 2, 4, 5, 10, 20, 43, 86, 172, 215, 430, 860 | 12 | 1848 | 988 | abundant, composite |
| 861 | 1, 3, 7, 21, 41, 123, 287, 861 | 8 | 1344 | 483 | deficient, composite |
| 862 | 1, 2, 431, 862 | 4 | 1296 | 434 | deficient, composite |
| 863 | 1, 863 | 2 | 864 | 1 | deficient, prime |
| 864 | 1, 2, 3, 4, 6, 8, 9, 12, 16, 18, 24, 27, 32, 36, 48, 54, 72, 96, 108, 144, 216, 288, 432, 864 | 24 | 2520 | 1656 | abundant, composite |
| 865 | 1, 5, 173, 865 | 4 | 1044 | 179 | deficient, composite |
| 866 | 1, 2, 433, 866 | 4 | 1302 | 436 | deficient, composite |
| 867 | 1, 3, 17, 51, 289, 867 | 6 | 1228 | 361 | deficient, composite |
| 868 | 1, 2, 4, 7, 14, 28, 31, 62, 124, 217, 434, 868 | 12 | 1792 | 924 | abundant, composite |
| 869 | 1, 11, 79, 869 | 4 | 960 | 91 | deficient, composite |
| 870 | 1, 2, 3, 5, 6, 10, 15, 29, 30, 58, 87, 145, 174, 290, 435, 870 | 16 | 2160 | 1290 | abundant, composite |
| 871 | 1, 13, 67, 871 | 4 | 952 | 81 | deficient, composite |
| 872 | 1, 2, 4, 8, 109, 218, 436, 872 | 8 | 1650 | 778 | deficient, composite |
| 873 | 1, 3, 9, 97, 291, 873 | 6 | 1274 | 401 | deficient, composite |
| 874 | 1, 2, 19, 23, 38, 46, 437, 874 | 8 | 1440 | 566 | deficient, composite |
| 875 | 1, 5, 7, 25, 35, 125, 175, 875 | 8 | 1248 | 373 | deficient, composite |
| 876 | 1, 2, 3, 4, 6, 12, 73, 146, 219, 292, 438, 876 | 12 | 2072 | 1196 | abundant, composite |
| 877 | 1, 877 | 2 | 878 | 1 | deficient, prime |
| 878 | 1, 2, 439, 878 | 4 | 1320 | 442 | deficient, composite |
| 879 | 1, 3, 293, 879 | 4 | 1176 | 297 | deficient, composite |
| 880 | 1, 2, 4, 5, 8, 10, 11, 16, 20, 22, 40, 44, 55, 80, 88, 110, 176, 220, 440, 880 | 20 | 2232 | 1352 | abundant, composite |
| 881 | 1, 881 | 2 | 882 | 1 | deficient, prime |
| 882 | 1, 2, 3, 6, 7, 9, 14, 18, 21, 42, 49, 63, 98, 126, 147, 294, 441, 882 | 18 | 2223 | 1341 | abundant, composite |
| 883 | 1, 883 | 2 | 884 | 1 | deficient, prime |
| 884 | 1, 2, 4, 13, 17, 26, 34, 52, 68, 221, 442, 884 | 12 | 1764 | 880 | deficient, composite |
| 885 | 1, 3, 5, 15, 59, 177, 295, 885 | 8 | 1440 | 555 | deficient, composite |
| 886 | 1, 2, 443, 886 | 4 | 1332 | 446 | deficient, composite |
| 887 | 1, 887 | 2 | 888 | 1 | deficient, prime |
| 888 | 1, 2, 3, 4, 6, 8, 12, 24, 37, 74, 111, 148, 222, 296, 444, 888 | 16 | 2280 | 1392 | abundant, composite |
| 889 | 1, 7, 127, 889 | 4 | 1024 | 135 | deficient, composite |
| 890 | 1, 2, 5, 10, 89, 178, 445, 890 | 8 | 1620 | 730 | deficient, composite |
| 891 | 1, 3, 9, 11, 27, 33, 81, 99, 297, 891 | 10 | 1452 | 561 | deficient, composite |
| 892 | 1, 2, 4, 223, 446, 892 | 6 | 1568 | 676 | deficient, composite |
| 893 | 1, 19, 47, 893 | 4 | 960 | 67 | deficient, composite |
| 894 | 1, 2, 3, 6, 149, 298, 447, 894 | 8 | 1800 | 906 | abundant, composite |
| 895 | 1, 5, 179, 895 | 4 | 1080 | 185 | deficient, composite |
| 896 | 1, 2, 4, 7, 8, 14, 16, 28, 32, 56, 64, 112, 128, 224, 448, 896 | 16 | 2040 | 1144 | abundant, composite |
| 897 | 1, 3, 13, 23, 39, 69, 299, 897 | 8 | 1344 | 447 | deficient, composite |
| 898 | 1, 2, 449, 898 | 4 | 1350 | 452 | deficient, composite |
| 899 | 1, 29, 31, 899 | 4 | 960 | 61 | deficient, composite |
| 900 | 1, 2, 3, 4, 5, 6, 9, 10, 12, 15, 18, 20, 25, 30, 36, 45, 50, 60, 75, 90, 100, 150, 180, 225, 300, 450, 900 | 27 | 2821 | 1921 | abundant, composite |
| 901 | 1, 17, 53, 901 | 4 | 972 | 71 | deficient, composite |
| 902 | 1, 2, 11, 22, 41, 82, 451, 902 | 8 | 1512 | 610 | deficient, composite |
| 903 | 1, 3, 7, 21, 43, 129, 301, 903 | 8 | 1408 | 505 | deficient, composite |
| 904 | 1, 2, 4, 8, 113, 226, 452, 904 | 8 | 1710 | 806 | deficient, composite |
| 905 | 1, 5, 181, 905 | 4 | 1092 | 187 | deficient, composite |
| 906 | 1, 2, 3, 6, 151, 302, 453, 906 | 8 | 1824 | 918 | abundant, composite |
| 907 | 1, 907 | 2 | 908 | 1 | deficient, prime |
| 908 | 1, 2, 4, 227, 454, 908 | 6 | 1596 | 688 | deficient, composite |
| 909 | 1, 3, 9, 101, 303, 909 | 6 | 1326 | 417 | deficient, composite |
| 910 | 1, 2, 5, 7, 10, 13, 14, 26, 35, 65, 70, 91, 130, 182, 455, 910 | 16 | 2016 | 1106 | abundant, composite |
| 911 | 1, 911 | 2 | 912 | 1 | deficient, prime |
| 912 | 1, 2, 3, 4, 6, 8, 12, 16, 19, 24, 38, 48, 57, 76, 114, 152, 228, 304, 456, 912 | 20 | 2480 | 1568 | abundant, composite |
| 913 | 1, 11, 83, 913 | 4 | 1008 | 95 | deficient, composite |
| 914 | 1, 2, 457, 914 | 4 | 1374 | 460 | deficient, composite |
| 915 | 1, 3, 5, 15, 61, 183, 305, 915 | 8 | 1488 | 573 | deficient, composite |
| 916 | 1, 2, 4, 229, 458, 916 | 6 | 1610 | 694 | deficient, composite |
| 917 | 1, 7, 131, 917 | 4 | 1056 | 139 | deficient, composite |
| 918 | 1, 2, 3, 6, 9, 17, 18, 27, 34, 51, 54, 102, 153, 306, 459, 918 | 16 | 2160 | 1242 | abundant, composite |
| 919 | 1, 919 | 2 | 920 | 1 | deficient, prime |
| 920 | 1, 2, 4, 5, 8, 10, 20, 23, 40, 46, 92, 115, 184, 230, 460, 920 | 16 | 2160 | 1240 | abundant, composite |
| 921 | 1, 3, 307, 921 | 4 | 1232 | 311 | deficient, composite |
| 922 | 1, 2, 461, 922 | 4 | 1386 | 464 | deficient, composite |
| 923 | 1, 13, 71, 923 | 4 | 1008 | 85 | deficient, composite |
| 924 | 1, 2, 3, 4, 6, 7, 11, 12, 14, 21, 22, 28, 33, 42, 44, 66, 77, 84, 132, 154, 231, 308, 462, 924 | 24 | 2688 | 1764 | abundant, composite |
| 925 | 1, 5, 25, 37, 185, 925 | 6 | 1178 | 253 | deficient, composite |
| 926 | 1, 2, 463, 926 | 4 | 1392 | 466 | deficient, composite |
| 927 | 1, 3, 9, 103, 309, 927 | 6 | 1352 | 425 | deficient, composite |
| 928 | 1, 2, 4, 8, 16, 29, 32, 58, 116, 232, 464, 928 | 12 | 1890 | 962 | abundant, composite |
| 929 | 1, 929 | 2 | 930 | 1 | deficient, prime |
| 930 | 1, 2, 3, 5, 6, 10, 15, 30, 31, 62, 93, 155, 186, 310, 465, 930 | 16 | 2304 | 1374 | abundant, composite |
| 931 | 1, 7, 19, 49, 133, 931 | 6 | 1140 | 209 | deficient, composite |
| 932 | 1, 2, 4, 233, 466, 932 | 6 | 1638 | 706 | deficient, composite |
| 933 | 1, 3, 311, 933 | 4 | 1248 | 315 | deficient, composite |
| 934 | 1, 2, 467, 934 | 4 | 1404 | 470 | deficient, composite |
| 935 | 1, 5, 11, 17, 55, 85, 187, 935 | 8 | 1296 | 361 | deficient, composite |
| 936 | 1, 2, 3, 4, 6, 8, 9, 12, 13, 18, 24, 26, 36, 39, 52, 72, 78, 104, 117, 156, 234, 312, 468, 936 | 24 | 2730 | 1794 | abundant, composite |
| 937 | 1, 937 | 2 | 938 | 1 | deficient, prime |
| 938 | 1, 2, 7, 14, 67, 134, 469, 938 | 8 | 1632 | 694 | deficient, composite |
| 939 | 1, 3, 313, 939 | 4 | 1256 | 317 | deficient, composite |
| 940 | 1, 2, 4, 5, 10, 20, 47, 94, 188, 235, 470, 940 | 12 | 2016 | 1076 | abundant, composite |
| 941 | 1, 941 | 2 | 942 | 1 | deficient, prime |
| 942 | 1, 2, 3, 6, 157, 314, 471, 942 | 8 | 1896 | 954 | abundant, composite |
| 943 | 1, 23, 41, 943 | 4 | 1008 | 65 | deficient, composite |
| 944 | 1, 2, 4, 8, 16, 59, 118, 236, 472, 944 | 10 | 1860 | 916 | deficient, composite |
| 945 | 1, 3, 5, 7, 9, 15, 21, 27, 35, 45, 63, 105, 135, 189, 315, 945 | 16 | 1920 | 975 | abundant, composite, primitive abundant |
| 946 | 1, 2, 11, 22, 43, 86, 473, 946 | 8 | 1584 | 638 | deficient, composite |
| 947 | 1, 947 | 2 | 948 | 1 | deficient, prime |
| 948 | 1, 2, 3, 4, 6, 12, 79, 158, 237, 316, 474, 948 | 12 | 2240 | 1292 | abundant, composite |
| 949 | 1, 13, 73, 949 | 4 | 1036 | 87 | deficient, composite |
| 950 | 1, 2, 5, 10, 19, 25, 38, 50, 95, 190, 475, 950 | 12 | 1860 | 910 | deficient, composite |
| 951 | 1, 3, 317, 951 | 4 | 1272 | 321 | deficient, composite |
| 952 | 1, 2, 4, 7, 8, 14, 17, 28, 34, 56, 68, 119, 136, 238, 476, 952 | 16 | 2160 | 1208 | abundant, composite |
| 953 | 1, 953 | 2 | 954 | 1 | deficient, prime |
| 954 | 1, 2, 3, 6, 9, 18, 53, 106, 159, 318, 477, 954 | 12 | 2106 | 1152 | abundant, composite |
| 955 | 1, 5, 191, 955 | 4 | 1152 | 197 | deficient, composite |
| 956 | 1, 2, 4, 239, 478, 956 | 6 | 1680 | 724 | deficient, composite |
| 957 | 1, 3, 11, 29, 33, 87, 319, 957 | 8 | 1440 | 483 | deficient, composite |
| 958 | 1, 2, 479, 958 | 4 | 1440 | 482 | deficient, composite |
| 959 | 1, 7, 137, 959 | 4 | 1104 | 145 | deficient, composite |
| 960 | 1, 2, 3, 4, 5, 6, 8, 10, 12, 15, 16, 20, 24, 30, 32, 40, 48, 60, 64, 80, 96, 120, 160, 192, 240, 320, 480, 960 | 28 | 3048 | 2088 | abundant, highly abundant, composite |
| 961 | 1, 31, 961 | 3 | 993 | 32 | deficient, composite |
| 962 | 1, 2, 13, 26, 37, 74, 481, 962 | 8 | 1596 | 634 | deficient, composite |
| 963 | 1, 3, 9, 107, 321, 963 | 6 | 1404 | 441 | deficient, composite |
| 964 | 1, 2, 4, 241, 482, 964 | 6 | 1694 | 730 | deficient, composite |
| 965 | 1, 5, 193, 965 | 4 | 1164 | 199 | deficient, composite |
| 966 | 1, 2, 3, 6, 7, 14, 21, 23, 42, 46, 69, 138, 161, 322, 483, 966 | 16 | 2304 | 1338 | abundant, composite |
| 967 | 1, 967 | 2 | 968 | 1 | deficient, prime |
| 968 | 1, 2, 4, 8, 11, 22, 44, 88, 121, 242, 484, 968 | 12 | 1995 | 1027 | abundant, composite |
| 969 | 1, 3, 17, 19, 51, 57, 323, 969 | 8 | 1440 | 471 | deficient, composite |
| 970 | 1, 2, 5, 10, 97, 194, 485, 970 | 8 | 1764 | 794 | deficient, composite |
| 971 | 1, 971 | 2 | 972 | 1 | deficient, prime |
| 972 | 1, 2, 3, 4, 6, 9, 12, 18, 27, 36, 54, 81, 108, 162, 243, 324, 486, 972 | 18 | 2548 | 1576 | abundant, composite |
| 973 | 1, 7, 139, 973 | 4 | 1120 | 147 | deficient, composite |
| 974 | 1, 2, 487, 974 | 4 | 1464 | 490 | deficient, composite |
| 975 | 1, 3, 5, 13, 15, 25, 39, 65, 75, 195, 325, 975 | 12 | 1736 | 761 | deficient, composite |
| 976 | 1, 2, 4, 8, 16, 61, 122, 244, 488, 976 | 10 | 1922 | 946 | deficient, composite |
| 977 | 1, 977 | 2 | 978 | 1 | deficient, prime |
| 978 | 1, 2, 3, 6, 163, 326, 489, 978 | 8 | 1968 | 990 | abundant, composite |
| 979 | 1, 11, 89, 979 | 4 | 1080 | 101 | deficient, composite |
| 980 | 1, 2, 4, 5, 7, 10, 14, 20, 28, 35, 49, 70, 98, 140, 196, 245, 490, 980 | 18 | 2394 | 1414 | abundant, composite |
| 981 | 1, 3, 9, 109, 327, 981 | 6 | 1430 | 449 | deficient, composite |
| 982 | 1, 2, 491, 982 | 4 | 1476 | 494 | deficient, composite |
| 983 | 1, 983 | 2 | 984 | 1 | deficient, prime |
| 984 | 1, 2, 3, 4, 6, 8, 12, 24, 41, 82, 123, 164, 246, 328, 492, 984 | 16 | 2520 | 1536 | abundant, composite |
| 985 | 1, 5, 197, 985 | 4 | 1188 | 203 | deficient, composite |
| 986 | 1, 2, 17, 29, 34, 58, 493, 986 | 8 | 1620 | 634 | deficient, composite |
| 987 | 1, 3, 7, 21, 47, 141, 329, 987 | 8 | 1536 | 549 | deficient, composite |
| 988 | 1, 2, 4, 13, 19, 26, 38, 52, 76, 247, 494, 988 | 12 | 1960 | 972 | deficient, composite |
| 989 | 1, 23, 43, 989 | 4 | 1056 | 67 | deficient, composite |
| 990 | 1, 2, 3, 5, 6, 9, 10, 11, 15, 18, 22, 30, 33, 45, 55, 66, 90, 99, 110, 165, 198, 330, 495, 990 | 24 | 2808 | 1818 | abundant, composite |
| 991 | 1, 991 | 2 | 992 | 1 | deficient, prime |
| 992 | 1, 2, 4, 8, 16, 31, 32, 62, 124, 248, 496, 992 | 12 | 2016 | 1024 | abundant, composite |
| 993 | 1, 3, 331, 993 | 4 | 1328 | 335 | deficient, composite |
| 994 | 1, 2, 7, 14, 71, 142, 497, 994 | 8 | 1728 | 734 | deficient, composite |
| 995 | 1, 5, 199, 995 | 4 | 1200 | 205 | deficient, composite |
| 996 | 1, 2, 3, 4, 6, 12, 83, 166, 249, 332, 498, 996 | 12 | 2352 | 1356 | abundant, composite |
| 997 | 1, 997 | 2 | 998 | 1 | deficient, prime |
| 998 | 1, 2, 499, 998 | 4 | 1500 | 502 | deficient, composite |
| 999 | 1, 3, 9, 27, 37, 111, 333, 999 | 8 | 1520 | 521 | deficient, composite |
| 1000 | 1, 2, 4, 5, 8, 10, 20, 25, 40, 50, 100, 125, 200, 250, 500, 1000 | 16 | 2340 | 1340 | abundant, composite |

== See also ==
- List of prime numbers
- Table of prime factors
