= ESP =

ESP most commonly refers to:

- Extrasensory perception, a paranormal ability

ESP may also refer to:

== Arts, entertainment ==
=== Music ===
==== Albums ====
- E.S.P. (Bee Gees album), a 1987 album by the Bee Gees
- E.S.P. (Extra Sexual Persuasion), a 1983 album by soul singer Millie Jackson
- E.S.P. (Miles Davis album), a 1965 album by Miles Davis
- E.S.P. (Erick Sermon's Perception), a 2015 album by Erick Sermon

==== Songs ====
- "E.S.P." (song), the title track of the Bee Gees album
- "E.S.P.", a 1977 song by Masayoshi Takanaka from the album An Insatiable High
- "E.S.P.", a 1978 song by Buzzcocks from the album Love Bites
- "E.S.P.", a 1988 song by Cacophony from the album Go Off!
- "E.S.P.", a 1990 song by Deee-Lite from the album World Clique
- ESP, a 2000 album by The System
- "ESP", a 2017 song by N.E.R.D. from the album No One Ever Really Dies
- "ESP", a 2022 song by Beach House from the album Once Twice Melody

==== Other topics in music ====
- ESP Guitars, a manufacturer of electric guitars
- ESP-Disk, a 1960s free-jazz record label based in New York
- The Electric Soft Parade, a British band formed in 2001
- Eric Singer Project, a side project founded in the 1990s by musician Eric Singer
- E.S. Posthumus, an independent music group formed in 2000, that produces cinematic style music
- ESP, a collaboration between Space Tribe and other artists

=== Television ===
- E.S.P. (TV series), a horror Philippine drama by GMA Network
- "E.S.P." (UFO), an episode of the British science fiction television series UFO
- "ESP", an episode of Dr. Katz, Professional Therapist

== Business ==
- Easy Software Products, a software-development company, originator of the Common UNIX Printing System (CUPS)
- Email service provider, a specialist organisation that offers bulk email marketing services
- Entertainment Software Publishing, a Japanese video-game publisher

== Mathematics and computing ==
- EFI system partition, a partition used by machines that adhere to the Extensible Firmware Interface
- Email service provider (marketing), an organization offering e-mail services
- Encapsulating Security Payload, an encryption protocol within the IPsec suite
- Equally spaced polynomial
- ESP game, an online human computation game
- ESP register (Extended Stack Pointer register), in Intel IA-32 (x86/32-bit) assembler
- Euclidean shortest path, the problem of finding a route between two points while avoiding obstacles
- Event stream processing, technology that acts on data streams
- Psychology of programming, sometimes referred to as 'empirical study of programming'
- ESP32, a series of low-cost wireless-enabled microcontrollers

== People ==
- Elena Salvini Pierallini (1934–2024), Italian embroiderer and book artist
- Eliot Shorr-Parks (born 1986), American sports journalist

== Spain and Spanish ==
- 3-letter code for Spain in ISO 3166-1 alpha-3
- Spanish language (Español), non-ISO language code
- Spanish peseta, the ISO 4217 code for the former currency of Spain
- The Country Code for the Spanish Olympic Committee

== Technology ==
- Electrical submersible pump, a pump designed to work submerged in fluid
- Electron spin trapping, a scientific technique
- Electronic skip protection, in portable CD players
- Electronic stability program, a computer device used in cars to improve traction
- Electrostatic precipitator, a device that removes particles from a flowing gas
- Enhanced Smart Power, engine technology in Honda motorcycles
- Enterprise simulation platform, or Prepar3D, a Lockheed-Martin commercial version of Flight Simulator X SP2
- External static pressure, the air pressure faced by a fan blowing into an air duct
- External stowage platform, a type of cargo platform used on the International Space Station

== Other uses ==
- Eastern State Penitentiary, a museum in Philadelphia, former prison
- Effective Sensory Projection, a term used in the Silva self-help method
- Empire State Plaza in Albany, New York
- Empire State Pullers, a New York tractor pulling circuit
- English for specific purposes, a subset of English language learning and teaching
- European Skeptics Podcast (TheESP), a weekly podcast representing several European skeptic organisations in Europe
- Executive Success Programs, personal development courses offered by the NXIVM cult
- Extra-solar planet, a planet outside the Solar System
- Ezilenlerin Sosyalist Partisi, a Turkish political party
- Extracellular polymeric substance, produced by bacteria for aggregation and gliding mobility
- Expansion sphincter pharyngoplasty, modification of uvulopalatopharyngoplasty sleep surgery
