= List of repunit primes =

This is a list of repunit primes in various bases.

== Base 2 repunit primes ==
Base-2 repunit primes are called Mersenne primes.

== Base 3 repunit primes ==
The first few base-3 repunit primes are

13, 1093, 797161, 3754733257489862401973357979128773, 6957596529882152968992225251835887181478451547013 (sequence A076481 in the OEIS),

corresponding to $n$ of

3, 7, 13, 71, 103, 541, 1091, 1367, 1627, 4177, 9011, 9551, 36913, 43063, 49681, 57917, 483611, 877843, 2215303, 2704981, 3598867, 7973131, 8530117, ... (sequence A028491 in the OEIS).

== Base 4 repunit primes ==
The only base-4 repunit prime is 5 ($11_4$). $4^n-1 = \left(2^n+1\right)\left(2^n-1\right)$, and 3 always divides $2^n + 1$ when n is odd and $2^n - 1$ when n is even. For n greater than 2, both $2^n + 1$ and $2^n - 1$ are greater than 3, so removing the factor of 3 still leaves two factors greater than 1. Therefore, the number cannot be prime.

== Base 5 repunit primes ==
The first few base-5 repunit primes are

31, 19531, 12207031, 305175781, 177635683940025046467781066894531, 14693679385278593849609206715278070972733319459651094018859396328480215743184089660644531, 35032461608120426773093239582247903282006548546912894293926707097244777067146515037165954709053039550781, 815663058499815565838786763657068444462645532258620818469829556933715405574685778402862015856733535201783524826169013977050781 (sequence A086122 in the OEIS),

corresponding to $n$ of

3, 7, 11, 13, 47, 127, 149, 181, 619, 929, 3407, 10949, 13241, 13873, 16519, 201359, 396413, 1888279, 3300593, ..., 4939471, ..., 5154509, ... (sequence A004061 in the OEIS).

== Base 6 repunit primes ==
The first few base-6 repunit primes are

7, 43, 55987, 7369130657357778596659, 3546245297457217493590449191748546458005595187661976371, 133733063818254349335501779590081460423013416258060407531857720755181857441961908284738707408499507 (sequence A165210 in the OEIS),

corresponding to $n$ of

2, 3, 7, 29, 71, 127, 271, 509, 1049, 6389, 6883, 10613, 19889, 79987, 608099, 1365019, 3360347, ... (sequence A004062 in the OEIS).

== Base 7 repunit primes ==
The first few base-7 repunit primes are

2801, 16148168401, 85053461164796801949539541639542805770666392330682673302530819774105141531698707146930307290253537320447270457,
138502212710103408700774381033135503926663324993317631729227790657325163310341833227775945426052637092067324133850503035623601

corresponding to $n$ of

5, 13, 131, 149, 1699, 14221, 35201, 126037, 371669, 1264699, ... (sequence A004063 in the OEIS).

== Base 8 repunit primes ==
The only base-8 repunit prime is 73 ($111_8$). $8^n-1 = \left(4^n+2^n+1\right)\left(2^n-1\right)$, and 7 always divides $4^n + 2^n + 1$ when n is not divisible by 3 and $2^n - 1$ when n is divisible by 3. For n greater than 3, both $4^n + 2^n + 1$ and $2^n - 1$ are greater than 7, so removing the factor of 7 still leaves two factors greater than 1. Therefore, the number cannot be prime.

== Base 9 repunit primes ==
There are no base-9 repunit primes. $9^n-1 = \left(3^n+1\right)\left(3^n-1\right)$, and $3^n + 1$ and $3^n - 1$ are even, and one of $3^n + 1$ and $3^n - 1$ is divisible by 4. For n greater than 1, both $3^n + 1$ and $3^n - 1$ are greater than 4, so removing the factor of 8 (which is equivalent to removing the factor 4 from $3^n + 1$ or $3^n - 1$, and removing the factor 2 from the other number) still leaves two factors greater than 1. Therefore, the number cannot be prime.

== Base 11 repunit primes ==
The first few base-11 repunit primes are

50544702849929377, 6115909044841454629, 1051153199500053598403188407217590190707671147285551702341089650185945215953, 567000232521795739625828281267171344486805385881217575081149660163046217465544573355710592079769932651989153833612198334843467861091902034340949

corresponding to $n$ of

17, 19, 73, 139, 907, 1907, 2029, 4801, 5153, 10867, 20161, 293831, 1868983, ... (sequence A005808 in the OEIS).

== Base 12 repunit primes ==
The first few base-12 repunit primes are

13, 157, 22621, 29043636306420266077, 43570062353753446053455610056679740005056966111842089407838902783209959981593077811330507328327968191581, 388475052482842970801320278964160171426121951256610654799120070705613530182445862582590623785872890159937874339918941

corresponding to $n$ of

2, 3, 5, 19, 97, 109, 317, 353, 701, 9739, 14951, 37573, 46889, 769543, ... (sequence A004064 in the OEIS).

== Base 16 repunit primes ==
The only base-16 repunit prime is 17 ($11_{16}$). $16^n-1 = \left(4^n+1\right)\left(4^n-1\right)$, and 3 always divides $4^n - 1$, and 5 always divides $4^n + 1$ when n is odd and $4^n - 1$ when n is even. For n greater than 2, both $4^n + 1$ and $4^n - 1$ are greater than 15, so removing the factor of 15 still leaves two factors greater than 1. Therefore, the number cannot be prime.

== Base 20 repunit primes ==
The first few base-20 repunit primes are

421, 10778947368421, 689852631578947368421

corresponding to $n$ of

3, 11, 17, 1487, 31013, 48859, 61403, 472709, 984349, ... (sequence A127995 in the OEIS).

== Bases b such that R_{p}(b) is prime for prime p ==
Smallest base $b$ such that $R_p(b)$ is prime (where $p$ is the $n$th prime) are

2, 2, 2, 2, 5, 2, 2, 2, 10, 6, 2, 61, 14, 15, 5, 24, 19, 2, 46, 3, 11, 22, 41, 2, 12, 22, 3, 2, 12, 86, 2, 7, 13, 11, 5, 29, 56, 30, 44, 60, 304, 5, 74, 118, 33, 156, 46, 183, 72, 606, 602, 223, 115, 37, 52, 104, 41, 6, 338, 217, 13, 136, 220, 162, 35, 10, 218, 19, 26, 39, 12, 22, 67, 120, 195, 48, 54, 463, 38, 41, 17, 808, 404, 46, 76, 793, 38, 28, 215, 37, 236, 59, 15, 514, 260, 498, 6, 2, 95, 3, ... (sequence A066180 in the OEIS)

Smallest base $b$ such that $R_p(-b)$ is prime (where $p$ is the $n$th prime) are

3, 2, 2, 2, 2, 2, 2, 2, 2, 7, 2, 16, 61, 2, 6, 10, 6, 2, 5, 46, 18, 2, 49, 16, 70, 2, 5, 6, 12, 92, 2, 48, 89, 30, 16, 147, 19, 19, 2, 16, 11, 289, 2, 12, 52, 2, 66, 9, 22, 5, 489, 69, 137, 16, 36, 96, 76, 117, 26, 3, 159, 10, 16, 209, 2, 16, 23, 273, 2, 460, 22, 3, 36, 28, 329, 43, 69, 86, 271, 396, 28, 83, 302, 209, 11, 300, 159, 79, 31, 331, 52, 176, 3, 28, 217, 14, 410, 252, 718, 164, ... (sequence A103795 in the OEIS)

$p$	positive bases $b$ such that $R_p(b)$ is prime (listed up to 2500)	negative bases $b$ such that $R_p(b)$ is prime (listed up to 2500)
2	2, 4, 6, 10, 12, 16, 18, 22, 28, 30, 36, 40, 42, 46, 52, 58, 60, 66, 70, 72, 78, 82, 88, 96, 100, 102, 106, 108, 112, 126, 130, 136, 138, 148, 150, 156, 162, 166, 172, 178, 180, 190, 192, 196, 198, 210, 222, 226, 228, 232, 238, 240, 250, 256, 262, 268, 270, 276, 280, 282, 292, 306, 310, 312, 316, 330, 336, 346, 348, 352, 358, 366, 372, 378, 382, 388, 396, 400, 408, 418, 420, 430, 432, 438, 442, 448, 456, 460, 462, 466, 478, 486, 490, 498, 502, 508, 520, 522, 540, 546, 556, 562, 568, 570, 576, 586, 592, 598, 600, 606, 612, 616, 618, 630, 640, 642, 646, 652, 658, 660, 672, 676, 682, 690, 700, 708, 718, 726, 732, 738, 742, 750, 756, 760, 768, 772, 786, 796, 808, 810, 820, 822, 826, 828, 838, 852, 856, 858, 862, 876, 880, 882, 886, 906, 910, 918, 928, 936, 940, 946, 952, 966, 970, 976, 982, 990, 996, 1008, 1012, 1018, 1020, 1030, 1032, 1038, 1048, 1050, 1060, 1062, 1068, 1086, 1090, 1092, 1096, 1102, 1108, 1116, 1122, 1128, 1150, 1152, 1162, 1170, 1180, 1186, 1192, 1200, 1212, 1216, 1222, 1228, 1230, 1236, 1248, 1258, 1276, 1278, 1282, 1288, 1290, 1296, 1300, 1302, 1306, 1318, 1320, 1326, 1360, 1366, 1372, 1380, 1398, 1408, 1422, 1426, 1428, 1432, 1438, 1446, 1450, 1452, 1458, 1470, 1480, 1482, 1486, 1488, 1492, 1498, 1510, 1522, 1530, 1542, 1548, 1552, 1558, 1566, 1570, 1578, 1582, 1596, 1600, 1606, 1608, 1612, 1618, 1620, 1626, 1636, 1656, 1662, 1666, 1668, 1692, 1696, 1698, 1708, 1720, 1722, 1732, 1740, 1746, 1752, 1758, 1776, 1782, 1786, 1788, 1800, 1810, 1822, 1830, 1846, 1860, 1866, 1870, 1872, 1876, 1878, 1888, 1900, 1906, 1912, 1930, 1932, 1948, 1950, 1972, 1978, 1986, 1992, 1996, 1998, 2002, 2010, 2016, 2026, 2028, 2038, 2052, 2062, 2068, 2080, 2082, 2086, 2088, 2098, 2110, 2112, 2128, 2130, 2136, 2140, 2142, 2152, 2160, 2178, 2202, 2206, 2212, 2220, 2236, 2238, 2242, 2250, 2266, 2268, 2272, 2280, 2286, 2292, 2296, 2308, 2310, 2332, 2338, 2340, 2346, 2350, 2356, 2370, 2376, 2380, 2382, 2388, 2392, 2398, 2410, 2416, 2422, 2436, 2440, 2446, 2458, 2466, 2472, 2476, ...	3, 4, 6, 8, 12, 14, 18, 20, 24, 30, 32, 38, 42, 44, 48, 54, 60, 62, 68, 72, 74, 80, 84, 90, 98, 102, 104, 108, 110, 114, 128, 132, 138, 140, 150, 152, 158, 164, 168, 174, 180, 182, 192, 194, 198, 200, 212, 224, 228, 230, 234, 240, 242, 252, 258, 264, 270, 272, 278, 282, 284, 294, 308, 312, 314, 318, 332, 338, 348, 350, 354, 360, 368, 374, 380, 384, 390, 398, 402, 410, 420, 422, 432, 434, 440, 444, 450, 458, 462, 464, 468, 480, 488, 492, 500, 504, 510, 522, 524, 542, 548, 558, 564, 570, 572, 578, 588, 594, 600, 602, 608, 614, 618, 620, 632, 642, 644, 648, 654, 660, 662, 674, 678, 684, 692, 702, 710, 720, 728, 734, 740, 744, 752, 758, 762, 770, 774, 788, 798, 810, 812, 822, 824, 828, 830, 840, 854, 858, 860, 864, 878, 882, 884, 888, 908, 912, 920, 930, 938, 942, 948, 954, 968, 972, 978, 984, 992, 998, 1010, 1014, 1020, 1022, 1032, 1034, 1040, 1050, 1052, 1062, 1064, 1070, 1088, 1092, 1094, 1098, 1104, 1110, 1118, 1124, 1130, 1152, 1154, 1164, 1172, 1182, 1188, 1194, 1202, 1214, 1218, 1224, 1230, 1232, 1238, 1250, 1260, 1278, 1280, 1284, 1290, 1292, 1298, 1302, 1304, 1308, 1320, 1322, 1328, 1362, 1368, 1374, 1382, 1400, 1410, 1424, 1428, 1430, 1434, 1440, 1448, 1452, 1454, 1460, 1472, 1482, 1484, 1488, 1490, 1494, 1500, 1512, 1524, 1532, 1544, 1550, 1554, 1560, 1568, 1572, 1580, 1584, 1598, 1602, 1608, 1610, 1614, 1620, 1622, 1628, 1638, 1658, 1664, 1668, 1670, 1694, 1698, 1700, 1710, 1722, 1724, 1734, 1742, 1748, 1754, 1760, 1778, 1784, 1788, 1790, 1802, 1812, 1824, 1832, 1848, 1862, 1868, 1872, 1874, 1878, 1880, 1890, 1902, 1908, 1914, 1932, 1934, 1950, 1952, 1974, 1980, 1988, 1994, 1998, 2000, 2004, 2012, 2018, 2028, 2030, 2040, 2054, 2064, 2070, 2082, 2084, 2088, 2090, 2100, 2112, 2114, 2130, 2132, 2138, 2142, 2144, 2154, 2162, 2180, 2204, 2208, 2214, 2222, 2238, 2240, 2244, 2252, 2268, 2270, 2274, 2282, 2288, 2294, 2298, 2310, 2312, 2334, 2340, 2342, 2348, 2352, 2358, 2372, 2378, 2382, 2384, 2390, 2394, 2400, 2412, 2418, 2424, 2438, 2442, 2448, 2460, 2468, 2474, 2478, ...
3	2, 3, 5, 6, 8, 12, 14, 15, 17, 20, 21, 24, 27, 33, 38, 41, 50, 54, 57, 59, 62, 66, 69, 71, 75, 77, 78, 80, 89, 90, 99, 101, 105, 110, 111, 117, 119, 131, 138, 141, 143, 147, 150, 153, 155, 161, 162, 164, 167, 168, 173, 176, 188, 189, 192, 194, 203, 206, 209, 215, 218, 231, 236, 245, 246, 266, 272, 278, 279, 287, 288, 290, 293, 309, 314, 329, 332, 336, 342, 344, 348, 351, 357, 369, 378, 381, 383, 392, 395, 398, 402, 404, 405, 414, 416, 426, 434, 435, 447, 453, 455, 456, 476, 489, 495, 500, 512, 518, 525, 530, 531, 533, 537, 540, 551, 554, 560, 566, 567, 572, 579, 582, 584, 603, 605, 609, 612, 621, 624, 626, 635, 642, 644, 668, 671, 677, 686, 696, 701, 720, 726, 728, 735, 743, 747, 755, 761, 762, 768, 773, 782, 785, 792, 798, 801, 812, 818, 819, 825, 827, 836, 839, 846, 855, 857, 860, 864, 875, 878, 890, 894, 897, 899, 911, 915, 918, 920, 927, 950, 959, 960, 969, 974, 981, 987, 990, 992, 993, 1001, 1002, 1007, 1011, 1016, 1020, 1022, 1029, 1041, 1058, 1065, 1067, 1070, 1074, 1077, 1091, 1092, 1097, 1098, 1107, 1116, 1118, 1125, 1130, 1133, 1142, 1146, 1148, 1149, 1163, 1181, 1182, 1191, 1193, 1196, 1200, 1202, 1209, 1217, 1221, 1230, 1254, 1256, 1260, 1263, 1272, 1274, 1275, 1281, 1295, 1308, 1314, 1317, 1323, 1331, 1340, 1343, 1349, 1352, 1359, 1364, 1365, 1373, 1380, 1386, 1392, 1401, 1415, 1421, 1422, 1427, 1434, 1440, 1442, 1443, 1448, 1449, 1454, 1473, 1475, 1484, 1487, 1494, 1505, 1515, 1520, 1526, 1529, 1536, 1539, 1547, 1548, 1559, 1560, 1562, 1566, 1568, 1581, 1583, 1590, 1592, 1596, 1611, 1616, 1620, 1632, 1644, 1646, 1650, 1658, 1659, 1665, 1676, 1685, 1692, 1695, 1700, 1701, 1707, 1709, 1716, 1718, 1746, 1748, 1757, 1767, 1770, 1788, 1800, 1806, 1809, 1811, 1814, 1818, 1826, 1832, 1841, 1847, 1848, 1853, 1863, 1886, 1895, 1902, 1923, 1931, 1932, 1952, 1956, 1970, 1973, 1974, 1977, 1982, 1986, 1994, 2000, 2010, 2015, 2016, 2022, 2033, 2043, 2049, 2054, 2058, 2064, 2073, 2075, 2079, 2085, 2091, 2105, 2112, 2117, 2129, 2136, 2138, 2142, 2145, 2157, 2159, 2162, 2163, 2168, 2171, 2183, 2201, 2204, 2205, 2238, 2241, 2247, 2255, 2259, 2262, 2264, 2273, 2276, 2280, 2301, 2303, 2309, 2313, 2318, 2324, 2339, 2345, 2360, 2364, 2372, 2373, 2385, 2387, 2390, 2397, 2402, 2409, 2411, 2429, 2430, 2435, 2442, 2450, 2451, 2456, 2463, 2465, 2471, 2478, 2483, 2484, 2493, 2495, 2498, ...	2, 3, 4, 6, 7, 9, 13, 15, 16, 18, 21, 22, 25, 28, 34, 39, 42, 51, 55, 58, 60, 63, 67, 70, 72, 76, 78, 79, 81, 90, 91, 100, 102, 106, 111, 112, 118, 120, 132, 139, 142, 144, 148, 151, 154, 156, 162, 163, 165, 168, 169, 174, 177, 189, 190, 193, 195, 204, 207, 210, 216, 219, 232, 237, 246, 247, 267, 273, 279, 280, 288, 289, 291, 294, 310, 315, 330, 333, 337, 343, 345, 349, 352, 358, 370, 379, 382, 384, 393, 396, 399, 403, 405, 406, 415, 417, 427, 435, 436, 448, 454, 456, 457, 477, 490, 496, 501, 513, 519, 526, 531, 532, 534, 538, 541, 552, 555, 561, 567, 568, 573, 580, 583, 585, 604, 606, 610, 613, 622, 625, 627, 636, 643, 645, 669, 672, 678, 687, 697, 702, 721, 727, 729, 736, 744, 748, 756, 762, 763, 769, 774, 783, 786, 793, 799, 802, 813, 819, 820, 826, 828, 837, 840, 847, 856, 858, 861, 865, 876, 879, 891, 895, 898, 900, 912, 916, 919, 921, 928, 951, 960, 961, 970, 975, 982, 988, 991, 993, 994, 1002, 1003, 1008, 1012, 1017, 1021, 1023, 1030, 1042, 1059, 1066, 1068, 1071, 1075, 1078, 1092, 1093, 1098, 1099, 1108, 1117, 1119, 1126, 1131, 1134, 1143, 1147, 1149, 1150, 1164, 1182, 1183, 1192, 1194, 1197, 1201, 1203, 1210, 1218, 1222, 1231, 1255, 1257, 1261, 1264, 1273, 1275, 1276, 1282, 1296, 1309, 1315, 1318, 1324, 1332, 1341, 1344, 1350, 1353, 1360, 1365, 1366, 1374, 1381, 1387, 1393, 1402, 1416, 1422, 1423, 1428, 1435, 1441, 1443, 1444, 1449, 1450, 1455, 1474, 1476, 1485, 1488, 1495, 1506, 1516, 1521, 1527, 1530, 1537, 1540, 1548, 1549, 1560, 1561, 1563, 1567, 1569, 1582, 1584, 1591, 1593, 1597, 1612, 1617, 1621, 1633, 1645, 1647, 1651, 1659, 1660, 1666, 1677, 1686, 1693, 1696, 1701, 1702, 1708, 1710, 1717, 1719, 1747, 1749, 1758, 1768, 1771, 1789, 1801, 1807, 1810, 1812, 1815, 1819, 1827, 1833, 1842, 1848, 1849, 1854, 1864, 1887, 1896, 1903, 1924, 1932, 1933, 1953, 1957, 1971, 1974, 1975, 1978, 1983, 1987, 1995, 2001, 2011, 2016, 2017, 2023, 2034, 2044, 2050, 2055, 2059, 2065, 2074, 2076, 2080, 2086, 2092, 2106, 2113, 2118, 2130, 2137, 2139, 2143, 2146, 2158, 2160, 2163, 2164, 2169, 2172, 2184, 2202, 2205, 2206, 2239, 2242, 2248, 2256, 2260, 2263, 2265, 2274, 2277, 2281, 2302, 2304, 2310, 2314, 2319, 2325, 2340, 2346, 2361, 2365, 2373, 2374, 2386, 2388, 2391, 2398, 2403, 2410, 2412, 2430, 2431, 2436, 2443, 2451, 2452, 2457, 2464, 2466, 2472, 2479, 2484, 2485, 2494, 2496, 2499, ...
5	2, 7, 12, 13, 17, 22, 23, 24, 28, 29, 30, 40, 43, 44, 50, 62, 63, 68, 73, 74, 77, 79, 83, 85, 94, 99, 110, 117, 118, 120, 122, 127, 129, 134, 143, 145, 154, 162, 164, 165, 172, 175, 177, 193, 198, 204, 208, 222, 227, 239, 249, 254, 255, 260, 263, 265, 274, 275, 277, 285, 288, 292, 304, 308, 327, 337, 340, 352, 359, 369, 373, 393, 397, 408, 414, 417, 418, 437, 439, 448, 457, 459, 474, 479, 490, 492, 495, 503, 505, 514, 519, 528, 530, 538, 539, 540, 550, 557, 563, 567, 568, 572, 579, 594, 604, 617, 637, 645, 650, 662, 679, 694, 699, 714, 728, 745, 750, 765, 770, 772, 793, 804, 805, 824, 837, 854, 860, 864, 868, 880, 890, 919, 942, 954, 967, 968, 974, 979, 1007, 1009, 1044, 1045, 1047, 1053, 1078, 1079, 1085, 1102, 1108, 1129, 1133, 1135, 1152, 1154, 1157, 1173, 1178, 1183, 1187, 1209, 1228, 1239, 1249, 1253, 1282, 1284, 1297, 1327, 1333, 1343, 1348, 1352, 1370, 1377, 1382, 1398, 1419, 1429, 1452, 1462, 1463, 1475, 1480, 1493, 1503, 1520, 1525, 1553, 1557, 1562, 1563, 1579, 1657, 1662, 1663, 1668, 1672, 1679, 1683, 1684, 1694, 1695, 1704, 1748, 1749, 1755, 1760, 1762, 1767, 1770, 1788, 1838, 1843, 1859, 1883, 1914, 1927, 1944, 1947, 1960, 1975, 1977, 1979, 1987, 1990, 2032, 2034, 2037, 2052, 2059, 2069, 2080, 2090, 2097, 2098, 2118, 2123, 2134, 2164, 2167, 2175, 2177, 2218, 2228, 2233, 2243, 2245, 2252, 2272, 2274, 2289, 2295, 2299, 2300, 2305, 2318, 2328, 2332, 2340, 2362, 2373, 2375, 2382, 2383, 2387, 2430, 2432, 2438, 2448, 2450, 2464, 2483, 2487, 2499, ...	2, 3, 5, 10, 11, 12, 16, 20, 21, 22, 33, 37, 38, 43, 47, 48, 55, 71, 75, 76, 80, 81, 111, 121, 126, 131, 133, 135, 136, 141, 155, 157, 158, 165, 176, 177, 180, 203, 223, 242, 245, 251, 253, 256, 257, 258, 265, 268, 276, 286, 290, 297, 307, 322, 323, 342, 361, 363, 366, 375, 377, 385, 388, 396, 411, 427, 438, 452, 462, 483, 487, 495, 500, 505, 506, 507, 510, 528, 531, 551, 555, 583, 588, 603, 606, 610, 628, 641, 642, 652, 658, 676, 693, 702, 707, 716, 738, 741, 758, 760, 768, 782, 791, 792, 812, 813, 815, 836, 850, 861, 901, 912, 935, 960, 973, 978, 980, 982, 1012, 1023, 1026, 1035, 1045, 1057, 1065, 1066, 1068, 1071, 1087, 1093, 1105, 1116, 1127, 1137, 1148, 1155, 1156, 1158, 1160, 1165, 1166, 1178, 1187, 1191, 1215, 1230, 1243, 1265, 1266, 1270, 1276, 1281, 1291, 1310, 1320, 1341, 1342, 1353, 1365, 1368, 1375, 1401, 1433, 1452, 1462, 1473, 1475, 1488, 1496, 1506, 1530, 1541, 1550, 1551, 1560, 1567, 1585, 1593, 1598, 1605, 1611, 1615, 1618, 1621, 1637, 1643, 1660, 1661, 1676, 1686, 1692, 1695, 1698, 1715, 1716, 1717, 1738, 1752, 1761, 1775, 1780, 1791, 1805, 1818, 1831, 1838, 1840, 1842, 1846, 1848, 1873, 1901, 1903, 1923, 1926, 1928, 1935, 1940, 1946, 1947, 1948, 1962, 1970, 1990, 1996, 2017, 2023, 2025, 2046, 2058, 2066, 2080, 2102, 2111, 2112, 2143, 2160, 2165, 2170, 2192, 2210, 2222, 2227, 2232, 2233, 2256, 2258, 2265, 2271, 2275, 2293, 2303, 2320, 2326, 2330, 2332, 2333, 2335, 2343, 2353, 2366, 2386, 2390, 2392, 2440, 2457, 2463, 2473, ...
7	2, 3, 5, 6, 13, 14, 17, 26, 31, 38, 40, 46, 56, 60, 61, 66, 68, 72, 73, 80, 87, 89, 93, 95, 115, 122, 126, 128, 146, 149, 156, 158, 160, 163, 180, 186, 192, 203, 206, 208, 220, 221, 235, 237, 238, 251, 264, 266, 280, 282, 290, 294, 300, 303, 320, 341, 349, 350, 353, 363, 381, 395, 399, 404, 405, 417, 418, 436, 438, 447, 450, 461, 464, 466, 478, 523, 531, 539, 548, 560, 583, 584, 591, 599, 609, 611, 622, 646, 647, 655, 657, 660, 681, 698, 700, 710, 717, 734, 760, 765, 776, 798, 800, 802, 805, 822, 842, 856, 863, 870, 878, 899, 912, 913, 926, 927, 931, 940, 941, 942, 947, 959, 984, 998, 1029, 1046, 1052, 1055, 1081, 1084, 1087, 1111, 1115, 1117, 1131, 1136, 1144, 1148, 1161, 1169, 1188, 1189, 1194, 1195, 1197, 1221, 1224, 1229, 1248, 1266, 1277, 1280, 1281, 1284, 1291, 1297, 1309, 1316, 1333, 1339, 1348, 1363, 1364, 1371, 1377, 1382, 1402, 1404, 1409, 1418, 1419, 1424, 1425, 1438, 1439, 1455, 1469, 1480, 1482, 1489, 1494, 1512, 1529, 1537, 1547, 1550, 1554, 1558, 1563, 1565, 1566, 1567, 1572, 1579, 1585, 1596, 1605, 1606, 1608, 1609, 1622, 1627, 1630, 1651, 1668, 1672, 1679, 1687, 1700, 1708, 1710, 1714, 1738, 1750, 1753, 1757, 1762, 1766, 1783, 1790, 1796, 1797, 1802, 1808, 1816, 1831, 1839, 1840, 1854, 1855, 1885, 1888, 1899, 1904, 1911, 1915, 1918, 1920, 1929, 1941, 1958, 1978, 1985, 1990, 1998, 2015, 2039, 2057, 2071, 2072, 2097, 2100, 2126, 2127, 2131, 2139, 2151, 2152, 2156, 2158, 2159, 2181, 2186, 2188, 2190, 2193, 2201, 2205, 2219, 2222, 2226, 2230, 2232, 2244, 2245, 2265, 2274, 2293, 2299, 2303, 2306, 2308, 2321, 2359, 2378, 2404, 2408, 2436, 2440, 2450, 2463, 2466, 2480, 2491, 2496, ...	2, 3, 10, 11, 14, 15, 16, 17, 18, 21, 24, 25, 29, 37, 43, 44, 46, 49, 52, 54, 61, 66, 72, 73, 78, 84, 86, 87, 99, 101, 106, 114, 115, 128, 133, 135, 136, 143, 145, 148, 164, 169, 170, 173, 200, 219, 224, 226, 228, 231, 234, 240, 248, 255, 262, 275, 281, 282, 298, 301, 305, 320, 322, 327, 330, 339, 347, 359, 368, 369, 385, 387, 401, 417, 435, 442, 450, 455, 458, 488, 494, 508, 519, 521, 553, 579, 582, 590, 616, 621, 625, 628, 630, 638, 654, 669, 675, 691, 694, 711, 712, 714, 719, 724, 725, 728, 732, 737, 750, 756, 757, 765, 768, 773, 774, 778, 780, 793, 803, 810, 827, 828, 831, 842, 848, 865, 869, 901, 910, 919, 922, 926, 931, 936, 938, 960, 967, 971, 982, 1002, 1010, 1022, 1032, 1060, 1073, 1074, 1089, 1109, 1110, 1123, 1128, 1130, 1131, 1132, 1138, 1160, 1178, 1179, 1184, 1190, 1207, 1216, 1218, 1220, 1221, 1291, 1293, 1302, 1303, 1332, 1349, 1353, 1361, 1362, 1366, 1373, 1374, 1386, 1394, 1407, 1435, 1474, 1487, 1515, 1524, 1535, 1538, 1558, 1562, 1563, 1564, 1597, 1605, 1614, 1615, 1626, 1638, 1639, 1645, 1648, 1653, 1654, 1671, 1681, 1683, 1696, 1698, 1705, 1710, 1713, 1719, 1723, 1726, 1731, 1739, 1748, 1758, 1768, 1781, 1787, 1789, 1793, 1799, 1800, 1810, 1817, 1823, 1830, 1835, 1839, 1848, 1853, 1859, 1879, 1909, 1929, 1932, 1935, 1961, 1964, 1969, 1979, 1996, 1997, 2002, 2009, 2013, 2026, 2037, 2056, 2058, 2074, 2075, 2077, 2080, 2088, 2104, 2111, 2133, 2140, 2145, 2147, 2174, 2175, 2196, 2207, 2216, 2219, 2221, 2233, 2234, 2236, 2248, 2251, 2257, 2269, 2273, 2277, 2285, 2286, 2294, 2305, 2315, 2319, 2322, 2334, 2339, 2356, 2378, 2403, 2406, 2418, 2419, 2424, 2425, 2427, 2432, 2434, 2446, 2460, 2467, 2479, 2480, 2482, 2489, 2494, ...
11	5, 17, 20, 21, 30, 53, 60, 86, 137, 172, 195, 212, 224, 229, 258, 268, 272, 319, 339, 355, 365, 366, 389, 390, 398, 414, 467, 480, 504, 534, 539, 543, 567, 592, 619, 626, 654, 709, 735, 756, 766, 770, 778, 787, 806, 812, 874, 943, 973, 1003, 1036, 1040, 1065, 1091, 1103, 1194, 1210, 1213, 1239, 1243, 1249, 1264, 1309, 1311, 1341, 1348, 1357, 1377, 1425, 1433, 1437, 1448, 1449, 1459, 1510, 1528, 1575, 1586, 1601, 1631, 1661, 1696, 1698, 1701, 1748, 1770, 1840, 1859, 1864, 1874, 1910, 1924, 1942, 1954, 1977, 1985, 1993, 2000, 2029, 2039, 2087, 2089, 2123, 2149, 2167, 2215, 2228, 2238, 2261, 2274, 2294, 2301, 2307, 2319, 2320, 2323, 2338, 2393, 2403, 2416, 2438, 2457, 2458, 2461, ...	2, 6, 12, 13, 23, 24, 26, 35, 62, 69, 91, 105, 147, 160, 163, 183, 185, 193, 229, 232, 233, 236, 248, 262, 269, 280, 294, 303, 315, 330, 376, 394, 426, 430, 440, 464, 469, 491, 492, 508, 537, 625, 629, 647, 653, 666, 752, 772, 775, 786, 788, 832, 840, 852, 854, 855, 859, 905, 922, 972, 993, 998, 1012, 1041, 1043, 1061, 1076, 1082, 1129, 1136, 1158, 1173, 1177, 1199, 1208, 1237, 1266, 1277, 1312, 1336, 1338, 1370, 1386, 1405, 1439, 1442, 1455, 1508, 1522, 1543, 1553, 1564, 1566, 1626, 1665, 1734, 1775, 1810, 1821, 1829, 1840, 1844, 1908, 1910, 1938, 1963, 1982, 2009, 2017, 2040, 2070, 2083, 2101, 2105, 2118, 2163, 2170, 2201, 2203, 2224, 2231, 2244, 2329, 2346, 2347, 2373, 2433, 2450, 2456, 2461, 2486, 2493, ...
13	2, 3, 5, 7, 34, 37, 43, 59, 72, 94, 98, 110, 133, 149, 151, 159, 190, 207, 219, 221, 251, 260, 264, 267, 282, 286, 291, 319, 355, 363, 373, 382, 397, 398, 402, 406, 408, 412, 436, 442, 486, 489, 507, 542, 544, 552, 553, 582, 585, 592, 603, 610, 614, 634, 643, 645, 689, 708, 720, 730, 744, 769, 772, 806, 851, 853, 862, 882, 912, 928, 930, 952, 968, 993, 1006, 1019, 1025, 1040, 1047, 1097, 1098, 1120, 1125, 1131, 1133, 1153, 1165, 1172, 1175, 1191, 1245, 1248, 1271, 1273, 1281, 1299, 1305, 1306, 1311, 1346, 1376, 1378, 1400, 1403, 1404, 1412, 1428, 1442, 1450, 1471, 1502, 1570, 1585, 1660, 1662, 1666, 1736, 1754, 1757, 1836, 1853, 1861, 1885, 1903, 1913, 1915, 1972, 1975, 1987, 1988, 1995, 2006, 2033, 2052, 2073, 2098, 2191, 2193, 2206, 2210, 2252, 2255, 2267, 2280, 2314, 2319, 2324, 2346, 2362, 2366, 2417, 2444, 2450, 2479, 2486, ...	2, 3, 21, 22, 23, 35, 39, 74, 80, 84, 89, 108, 114, 121, 126, 134, 152, 153, 171, 180, 195, 204, 230, 256, 263, 297, 321, 326, 336, 342, 345, 351, 368, 390, 393, 397, 398, 399, 413, 427, 439, 490, 525, 563, 566, 574, 591, 602, 609, 630, 641, 652, 657, 660, 667, 682, 685, 694, 708, 712, 716, 721, 755, 760, 763, 791, 797, 813, 828, 839, 850, 862, 882, 898, 999, 1025, 1029, 1030, 1035, 1038, 1049, 1063, 1073, 1076, 1081, 1105, 1111, 1128, 1162, 1176, 1178, 1185, 1216, 1227, 1238, 1264, 1268, 1274, 1307, 1318, 1324, 1359, 1369, 1371, 1373, 1388, 1392, 1445, 1450, 1451, 1461, 1489, 1496, 1529, 1539, 1550, 1555, 1560, 1610, 1612, 1616, 1632, 1695, 1794, 1805, 1824, 1857, 1873, 1889, 1899, 1930, 1943, 1950, 1955, 1963, 1979, 1985, 1994, 2003, 2005, 2010, 2085, 2103, 2108, 2113, 2122, 2151, 2153, 2172, 2189, 2214, 2228, 2234, 2236, 2257, 2268, 2293, 2307, 2314, 2337, 2373, 2380, 2400, 2433, 2436, 2483, 2487, 2492, ...
17	2, 11, 20, 21, 28, 31, 55, 57, 62, 84, 87, 97, 107, 109, 129, 147, 149, 157, 160, 170, 181, 189, 191, 207, 241, 247, 251, 274, 295, 297, 315, 327, 335, 349, 351, 355, 364, 365, 368, 379, 383, 410, 419, 423, 431, 436, 438, 466, 472, 506, 513, 527, 557, 571, 597, 599, 614, 637, 653, 656, 688, 708, 709, 720, 740, 762, 835, 836, 874, 974, 976, 980, 982, 986, 1029, 1045, 1054, 1136, 1151, 1171, 1181, 1185, 1222, 1230, 1236, 1240, 1280, 1319, 1332, 1367, 1371, 1375, 1392, 1402, 1435, 1447, 1481, 1495, 1496, 1519, 1525, 1530, 1536, 1547, 1556, 1592, 1603, 1607, 1615, 1683, 1692, 1706, 1726, 1775, 1776, 1782, 1793, 1828, 1833, 1846, 1945, 1967, 1988, 1998, 2001, 2002, 2046, 2049, 2064, 2100, 2103, 2108, 2165, 2183, 2192, 2206, 2223, 2249, 2259, 2268, 2295, 2301, 2303, 2312, 2321, 2343, 2351, 2371, 2395, 2406, 2443, 2446, 2468, 2471, 2492, 2494, ...	2, 7, 13, 17, 19, 41, 48, 58, 59, 66, 86, 129, 133, 139, 143, 146, 149, 166, 167, 231, 268, 270, 299, 328, 359, 387, 397, 408, 469, 523, 527, 534, 541, 553, 555, 569, 582, 583, 600, 608, 634, 664, 667, 672, 673, 709, 714, 720, 725, 733, 746, 759, 776, 802, 808, 822, 860, 870, 877, 892, 896, 902, 911, 962, 970, 975, 1034, 1050, 1051, 1082, 1090, 1109, 1148, 1150, 1168, 1185, 1198, 1200, 1209, 1212, 1233, 1235, 1261, 1281, 1312, 1338, 1339, 1357, 1380, 1382, 1387, 1403, 1411, 1440, 1441, 1459, 1477, 1483, 1497, 1503, 1560, 1561, 1578, 1583, 1689, 1691, 1710, 1751, 1752, 1755, 1789, 1797, 1826, 1883, 1887, 1901, 1912, 1950, 1955, 1965, 1986, 2016, 2032, 2038, 2041, 2060, 2071, 2074, 2083, 2093, 2121, 2126, 2139, 2180, 2182, 2193, 2195, 2247, 2292, 2340, 2461, 2493, ...
19	2, 10, 11, 12, 14, 19, 24, 40, 45, 46, 48, 65, 66, 67, 75, 85, 90, 103, 105, 117, 119, 137, 147, 164, 167, 179, 181, 205, 220, 235, 242, 253, 254, 263, 268, 277, 303, 315, 332, 337, 366, 369, 370, 389, 399, 404, 424, 431, 446, 449, 480, 481, 506, 509, 521, 523, 531, 547, 567, 573, 581, 622, 646, 651, 673, 736, 768, 787, 797, 807, 810, 811, 817, 840, 846, 857, 867, 869, 870, 888, 899, 902, 971, 988, 990, 992, 1010, 1023, 1030, 1041, 1042, 1072, 1102, 1112, 1116, 1143, 1147, 1208, 1218, 1223, 1252, 1256, 1257, 1260, 1291, 1330, 1335, 1340, 1402, 1454, 1536, 1538, 1594, 1622, 1625, 1631, 1642, 1648, 1693, 1701, 1709, 1726, 1734, 1759, 1767, 1779, 1794, 1809, 1822, 1858, 1954, 1988, 1992, 1999, 2024, 2030, 2065, 2067, 2081, 2101, 2135, 2150, 2180, 2193, 2196, 2219, 2239, 2293, 2325, 2330, 2336, 2358, 2382, 2390, 2402, 2403, 2409, 2457, 2461, 2478, 2480, 2499, ...	2, 10, 13, 24, 28, 43, 47, 49, 54, 65, 83, 98, 106, 143, 152, 177, 184, 190, 194, 195, 241, 249, 259, 264, 292, 315, 319, 345, 353, 355, 386, 394, 481, 500, 517, 525, 534, 535, 556, 595, 601, 649, 656, 680, 686, 687, 697, 707, 710, 756, 798, 804, 817, 818, 829, 839, 841, 858, 864, 891, 906, 912, 932, 948, 973, 991, 994, 1012, 1030, 1032, 1036, 1046, 1057, 1060, 1066, 1071, 1089, 1166, 1175, 1203, 1205, 1227, 1237, 1261, 1283, 1284, 1319, 1327, 1335, 1336, 1337, 1356, 1372, 1387, 1412, 1413, 1439, 1450, 1460, 1483, 1488, 1495, 1502, 1515, 1518, 1521, 1532, 1676, 1677, 1685, 1686, 1720, 1722, 1734, 1739, 1758, 1759, 1762, 1782, 1792, 1814, 1822, 1833, 1834, 1838, 1839, 1869, 1884, 1922, 1972, 1999, 2005, 2012, 2033, 2042, 2056, 2093, 2119, 2221, 2244, 2251, 2264, 2325, 2356, 2359, 2371, 2381, 2383, 2427, 2436, 2446, 2479, ...
23	10, 40, 82, 113, 127, 141, 170, 257, 275, 287, 295, 315, 344, 373, 442, 468, 609, 634, 646, 663, 671, 710, 819, 834, 857, 884, 894, 904, 992, 997, 1060, 1069, 1077, 1120, 1143, 1190, 1232, 1253, 1261, 1280, 1291, 1347, 1407, 1436, 1448, 1483, 1514, 1570, 1642, 1684, 1691, 1744, 1786, 1801, 1816, 1830, 1879, 1891, 1906, 1946, 1968, 1994, 2005, 2158, 2200, 2318, 2444, 2459, ...	2, 3, 7, 16, 17, 18, 25, 46, 47, 106, 110, 111, 118, 136, 144, 145, 230, 238, 361, 382, 422, 439, 474, 494, 495, 519, 588, 639, 657, 707, 733, 751, 802, 831, 863, 902, 925, 976, 994, 1001, 1059, 1140, 1181, 1240, 1249, 1319, 1375, 1442, 1458, 1508, 1699, 1734, 1751, 1757, 1760, 1766, 1807, 1849, 1897, 1904, 1914, 1922, 1978, 2029, 2057, 2075, 2139, 2166, 2183, 2209, 2216, 2241, 2246, 2270, 2307, 2309, 2367, 2429, 2446, 2456, ...
29	6, 40, 65, 70, 114, 151, 221, 229, 268, 283, 398, 451, 460, 519, 554, 587, 627, 628, 659, 687, 699, 859, 884, 915, 943, 974, 986, 1101, 1120, 1159, 1176, 1212, 1223, 1297, 1312, 1322, 1337, 1390, 1409, 1415, 1446, 1477, 1508, 1592, 1636, 1691, 1800, 1802, 1803, 1820, 2020, 2126, 2414, 2421, 2429, 2461, ...	7, 15, 25, 62, 119, 123, 154, 245, 285, 294, 295, 357, 371, 476, 626, 664, 690, 708, 723, 737, 768, 783, 803, 825, 826, 835, 841, 842, 867, 871, 897, 904, 934, 953, 1066, 1069, 1088, 1097, 1108, 1183, 1197, 1202, 1259, 1302, 1364, 1461, 1497, 1528, 1559, 1638, 1715, 1760, 1764, 1815, 1821, 1849, 1854, 1874, 2047, 2086, 2091, 2100, 2133, 2160, 2231, 2242, 2316, 2422, ...
31	2, 14, 19, 31, 44, 53, 71, 82, 117, 127, 131, 145, 177, 197, 203, 241, 258, 261, 276, 283, 293, 320, 325, 379, 387, 388, 406, 413, 461, 462, 470, 486, 491, 534, 549, 569, 582, 612, 618, 639, 696, 706, 723, 746, 765, 767, 774, 796, 802, 877, 878, 903, 923, 981, 991, 998, 1002, 1008, 1049, 1077, 1113, 1114, 1115, 1138, 1146, 1159, 1177, 1189, 1200, 1229, 1270, 1281, 1312, 1359, 1429, 1486, 1493, 1496, 1558, 1605, 1614, 1626, 1632, 1649, 1673, 1698, 1754, 1790, 1859, 1865, 1894, 1900, 1904, 1918, 1939, 1948, 1973, 1998, 1999, 2022, 2031, 2038, 2055, 2111, 2167, 2169, 2180, 2236, 2300, 2377, 2387, 2422, 2462, 2473, ...	2, 6, 10, 36, 65, 74, 78, 83, 106, 115, 120, 148, 161, 163, 168, 176, 189, 194, 197, 266, 270, 288, 331, 385, 399, 407, 410, 412, 413, 431, 468, 513, 524, 546, 569, 572, 578, 581, 600, 611, 625, 626, 647, 719, 723, 756, 832, 834, 849, 922, 986, 1006, 1007, 1047, 1064, 1102, 1199, 1217, 1247, 1335, 1349, 1353, 1372, 1374, 1382, 1400, 1405, 1410, 1418, 1419, 1422, 1426, 1444, 1457, 1554, 1568, 1590, 1622, 1678, 1680, 1683, 1684, 1695, 1725, 1840, 1847, 1861, 1874, 1895, 1939, 1950, 1987, 1988, 1990, 1999, 2070, 2081, 2093, 2180, 2183, 2212, 2216, 2220, 2227, 2266, 2303, 2337, 2349, 2389, 2408, 2418, 2426, ...
37	61, 77, 94, 97, 99, 113, 126, 130, 134, 147, 161, 172, 187, 202, 208, 246, 261, 273, 285, 302, 320, 432, 444, 503, 523, 525, 563, 666, 680, 709, 740, 757, 787, 902, 962, 964, 969, 1013, 1109, 1165, 1186, 1219, 1351, 1528, 1587, 1660, 1698, 1710, 1754, 1811, 1972, 2070, 2088, 2137, 2145, 2185, 2210, 2305, 2348, 2365, 2396, 2398, 2439, 2453, 2462, ...	16, 19, 21, 49, 56, 63, 71, 74, 77, 83, 92, 96, 99, 160, 172, 197, 198, 230, 241, 280, 283, 415, 425, 448, 490, 520, 627, 691, 735, 784, 803, 829, 842, 853, 871, 872, 893, 894, 973, 981, 989, 1043, 1060, 1061, 1071, 1179, 1182, 1203, 1290, 1299, 1317, 1370, 1389, 1477, 1478, 1496, 1562, 1601, 1624, 1714, 1789, 1848, 1890, 1942, 2016, 2083, 2156, 2217, 2250, 2253, 2266, 2313, 2315, 2319, 2323, 2343, 2358, 2361, 2363, 2383, 2396, 2398, 2399, 2401, 2486, ...
41	14, 53, 55, 58, 71, 76, 82, 211, 248, 271, 296, 316, 430, 433, 439, 472, 545, 553, 555, 596, 663, 677, 682, 746, 814, 832, 885, 926, 947, 959, 1048, 1121, 1146, 1175, 1207, 1300, 1302, 1390, 1404, 1445, 1466, 1541, 1650, 1699, 1702, 1706, 1756, 1757, 1782, 1902, 1944, 1963, 1994, 2012, 2042, 2122, 2163, 2344, 2348, 2369, 2439, 2442, 2465, ...	61, 63, 99, 144, 230, 312, 360, 401, 413, 424, 451, 515, 542, 567, 610, 618, 622, 651, 690, 732, 817, 871, 1007, 1100, 1156, 1278, 1403, 1427, 1460, 1535, 1572, 1604, 1681, 1742, 1802, 1820, 1847, 1903, 1910, 1913, 1978, 2019, 2104, 2134, 2152, 2169, 2309, 2383, 2491, ...
43	15, 21, 26, 86, 89, 114, 123, 163, 180, 310, 332, 377, 409, 438, 448, 457, 477, 526, 534, 556, 586, 612, 653, 665, 690, 692, 709, 760, 783, 803, 821, 848, 877, 899, 909, 942, 981, 1041, 1042, 1043, 1066, 1068, 1069, 1106, 1126, 1139, 1197, 1310, 1386, 1476, 1561, 1599, 1606, 1636, 1774, 1802, 1835, 1867, 2033, 2068, 2153, 2155, 2229, 2256, 2269, 2276, 2324, 2467, ...	2, 3, 6, 22, 59, 83, 91, 95, 120, 148, 195, 196, 201, 247, 252, 264, 315, 360, 378, 458, 555, 680, 792, 893, 1025, 1088, 1158, 1171, 1240, 1280, 1416, 1437, 1632, 1661, 1677, 1681, 1849, 1946, 1960, 2007, 2090, 2092, 2225, 2242, 2244, 2377, 2483, ...
47	5, 17, 19, 55, 62, 75, 89, 98, 99, 132, 172, 186, 197, 220, 268, 278, 279, 288, 439, 443, 496, 579, 583, 587, 742, 777, 825, 911, 966, 1003, 1029, 1155, 1202, 1267, 1377, 1461, 1472, 1473, 1530, 1562, 1634, 1682, 1705, 1783, 1848, 1852, 1885, 1900, 1943, 1957, 1969, 2036, 2044, 2105, 2111, 2265, 2282, 2485, ...	6, 7, 17, 90, 126, 139, 143, 257, 293, 295, 319, 387, 482, 519, 603, 720, 819, 884, 896, 903, 905, 921, 952, 954, 956, 1042, 1058, 1147, 1170, 1237, 1253, 1279, 1295, 1343, 1366, 1370, 1406, 1465, 1514, 1593, 1595, 1607, 1609, 1622, 1701, 1705, 1709, 1736, 1772, 1791, 1833, 1860, 1866, 1969, 1990, 1992, 2059, 2115, 2132, 2169, 2219, 2233, 2253, 2344, ...
53	24, 45, 60, 165, 235, 272, 285, 298, 307, 381, 416, 429, 623, 799, 858, 924, 929, 936, 1034, 1067, 1076, 1130, 1223, 1243, 1327, 1488, 1592, 1594, 1659, 1673, 1676, 1678, 1762, 1873, 1917, 1928, 1997, 2110, 2117, 2141, 2166, 2231, 2243, 2293, 2338, 2380, 2420, 2424, 2428, 2463, 2466, ...	10, 14, 40, 57, 111, 119, 406, 447, 475, 620, 646, 839, 848, 866, 909, 997, 1086, 1095, 1180, 1318, 1319, 1332, 1418, 1447, 1472, 1534, 1617, 1681, 1684, 1735, 1788, 1955, 2037, 2118, 2120, 2163, 2169, 2170, 2390, 2407, 2440, 2498, ...
59	19, 70, 102, 116, 126, 188, 209, 257, 294, 359, 451, 461, 468, 470, 638, 653, 710, 762, 766, 781, 824, 901, 939, 964, 995, 1036, 1047, 1098, 1150, 1211, 1234, 1243, 1256, 1278, 1389, 1401, 1422, 1436, 1454, 1492, 1523, 1639, 1703, 1705, 1826, 1913, 1915, 1978, 2013, 2043, 2131, 2140, 2200, 2208, 2228, 2229, 2307, 2309, 2323, 2365, 2480, 2485, ...	6, 9, 25, 46, 89, 92, 109, 133, 136, 140, 167, 173, 213, 239, 255, 277, 337, 350, 359, 553, 554, 586, 594, 599, 639, 692, 710, 815, 860, 864, 1015, 1030, 1050, 1094, 1106, 1110, 1112, 1195, 1199, 1211, 1216, 1260, 1347, 1363, 1370, 1459, 1476, 1477, 1507, 1541, 1556, 1597, 1599, 1620, 1636, 1662, 1696, 1724, 1757, 1786, 1860, 1867, 1923, 1949, 1984, 2004, 2081, 2116, 2177, 2219, 2231, 2305, 2376, 2417, 2443, 2494, ...
61	2, 19, 69, 88, 138, 155, 205, 234, 336, 420, 425, 455, 470, 525, 555, 561, 608, 626, 667, 674, 766, 779, 846, 851, 937, 971, 998, 1053, 1055, 1112, 1137, 1263, 1329, 1383, 1445, 1448, 1499, 1544, 1551, 1578, 1640, 1689, 1724, 1750, 1793, 1868, 2143, 2241, 2358, 2407, 2414, ...	2, 7, 70, 178, 208, 251, 274, 276, 290, 326, 328, 350, 413, 452, 552, 558, 594, 595, 605, 607, 626, 787, 791, 801, 905, 971, 1019, 1091, 1117, 1140, 1198, 1241, 1274, 1357, 1428, 1462, 1604, 1647, 1654, 1705, 1717, 1908, 1987, 2061, 2109, 2161, 2309, 2372, 2450, 2491, ...
67	46, 122, 238, 304, 314, 315, 328, 332, 346, 372, 382, 426, 440, 491, 496, 510, 524, 528, 566, 638, 733, 826, 1016, 1054, 1071, 1214, 1309, 1338, 1388, 1401, 1457, 1512, 1536, 1582, 1624, 1718, 1773, 1814, 1816, 1825, 1952, 1985, 2021, 2072, 2308, 2349, 2449, 2481, ...	5, 10, 23, 33, 40, 54, 193, 326, 330, 364, 375, 382, 388, 404, 438, 449, 562, 625, 626, 683, 700, 765, 797, 807, 1001, 1017, 1136, 1181, 1216, 1242, 1249, 1254, 1286, 1386, 1412, 1482, 1581, 1656, 1748, 1832, 1873, 1921, 2017, 2038, 2061, 2166, 2193, 2204, 2253, 2271, 2418, 2475, ...
71	3, 6, 17, 24, 37, 89, 132, 374, 387, 402, 421, 435, 453, 464, 490, 516, 708, 736, 919, 947, 981, 1033, 1067, 1170, 1195, 1253, 1284, 1349, 1385, 1409, 1479, 1709, 1724, 1726, 1735, 1875, 1950, 1984, 2012, 2070, 2124, 2133, 2161, 2194, 2424, 2432, 2459, ...	46, 94, 99, 189, 226, 236, 244, 372, 387, 390, 409, 410, 424, 442, 478, 540, 574, 608, 611, 644, 653, 695, 707, 846, 868, 1036, 1248, 1336, 1374, 1395, 1418, 1424, 1549, 1665, 1737, 1856, 1866, 1880, 1917, 1937, 2105, 2114, 2126, 2141, 2166, 2202, 2217, 2274, 2297, 2298, 2311, 2314, 2321, 2377, 2430, 2431, ...
73	11, 15, 75, 114, 195, 215, 295, 335, 378, 559, 566, 650, 660, 832, 871, 904, 966, 1021, 1112, 1203, 1334, 1433, 1485, 1724, 1822, 1959, 1998, 2115, 2154, 2432, 2465, 2486, ...	18, 214, 280, 394, 422, 444, 447, 571, 745, 787, 796, 886, 954, 960, 987, 1012, 1055, 1140, 1194, 1212, 1224, 1227, 1349, 1583, 1598, 1640, 1686, 1714, 1723, 1750, 1931, 1962, 2032, 2036, 2110, 2223, 2339, ...
79	22, 112, 140, 158, 170, 254, 271, 330, 334, 354, 390, 483, 528, 560, 565, 714, 850, 888, 924, 929, 933, 935, 970, 1019, 1047, 1141, 1266, 1338, 1359, 1376, 1412, 1485, 1504, 1542, 1598, 1607, 1618, 1747, 1773, 1814, 1843, 2087, 2088, 2100, 2167, 2186, 2233, 2311, 2358, 2359, 2363, 2429, ...	2, 20, 22, 35, 47, 72, 109, 133, 184, 211, 226, 259, 352, 470, 559, 720, 785, 800, 823, 842, 895, 1003, 1145, 1172, 1213, 1291, 1318, 1375, 1441, 1453, 1460, 1461, 1467, 1477, 1604, 1608, 1637, 1654, 1695, 1703, 1807, 1831, 1834, 1903, 1948, 2035, 2060, 2065, 2072, 2081, 2335, 2348, 2393, ...
83	41, 146, 386, 593, 667, 688, 906, 927, 930, 1025, 1032, 1111, 1410, 1437, 1638, 1829, 1960, 2045, 2381, 2384, ...	49, 75, 458, 471, 634, 734, 798, 809, 932, 1139, 1268, 1400, 1498, 1963, 1989, 2112, 2177, 2233, 2252, 2349, 2365, 2446, ...
89	2, 114, 159, 190, 234, 251, 436, 616, 834, 878, 1008, 1049, 1060, 1062, 1118, 1472, 1689, 1792, 2282, 2334, 2463, 2494, ...	16, 20, 93, 195, 227, 325, 465, 758, 888, 911, 1075, 1301, 1590, 1640, 1783, 1807, 2168, 2204, 2231, 2376, ...
97	12, 90, 104, 234, 271, 339, 420, 421, 428, 429, 464, 805, 909, 934, 1054, 1114, 1116, 1128, 1144, 1159, 1193, 1364, 1788, 2086, 2215, 2254, 2448, 2461, ...	70, 121, 300, 317, 348, 404, 412, 460, 515, 605, 839, 843, 904, 953, 1130, 1148, 1342, 1466, 1674, 1779, 1855, 2080, 2108, 2193, 2466, ...
101	22, 78, 164, 302, 332, 359, 387, 428, 456, 564, 617, 697, 703, 704, 785, 831, 979, 1003, 1045, 1327, 1388, 1400, 1505, 1586, 1845, 1855, 1969, 1990, 2015, 2082, 2104, 2274, 2339, ...	2, 5, 22, 98, 110, 131, 132, 137, 197, 206, 212, 333, 353, 371, 372, 441, 449, 500, 509, 658, 703, 711, 748, 786, 925, 961, 971, 1025, 1217, 1278, 1298, 1382, 1414, 1511, 1672, 1766, 1832, 1937, 2053, 2188, 2198, 2367, 2480, ...
103	3, 52, 345, 392, 421, 472, 584, 617, 633, 761, 767, 775, 785, 839, 1033, 1496, 1594, 1660, 1673, 1692, 1694, 1891, 1940, 2001, 2011, 2075, 2105, 2108, 2261, 2292, 2331, 2339, 2347, 2372, 2396, ...	5, 45, 96, 107, 138, 143, 164, 223, 249, 272, 339, 425, 453, 497, 506, 601, 703, 739, 750, 780, 859, 932, 942, 1010, 1037, 1173, 1274, 1291, 1357, 1399, 1482, 1491, 1552, 1602, 1791, 2206, 2390, 2482, 2491, ...
107	2, 19, 61, 68, 112, 157, 219, 349, 677, 692, 700, 809, 823, 867, 999, 1177, 1210, 1237, 1405, 1471, 1532, 1577, 1578, 1660, 1664, 1715, 1751, 2194, 2232, 2287, 2342, 2373, 2407, 2458, 2493, ...	6, 22, 46, 56, 79, 357, 377, 458, 469, 640, 678, 849, 980, 1064, 1106, 1156, 1194, 1208, 1338, 1449, 1483, 1666, 1743, 1753, 1796, 1803, 1841, 2034, 2280, 2321, ...
109	12, 57, 72, 79, 89, 129, 158, 165, 239, 240, 260, 277, 313, 342, 421, 445, 577, 945, 1003, 1122, 1198, 1224, 1268, 1381, 1399, 1428, 1504, 1506, 1565, 1567, 1638, 1674, 1784, 1968, 2312, 2365, ...	12, 23, 26, 31, 74, 118, 169, 192, 261, 503, 564, 568, 602, 655, 673, 725, 874, 885, 969, 972, 995, 1097, 1114, 1192, 1201, 1219, 1257, 1568, 1664, 1686, 1784, 1840, 1865, 1878, 1952, 1969, 1972, 1993, 2016, 2064, 2211, 2218, 2241, 2245, 2295, 2421, ...
113	86, 233, 266, 299, 334, 492, 592, 641, 656, 719, 946, 1404, 1477, 1511, 1602, 1635, 1669, 1824, 1833, 1962, 2169, 2241, 2448, 2498, 2499, ...	92, 116, 473, 636, 759, 822, 871, 982, 998, 1041, 1576, 1814, 1915, 1938, ...
127	2, 5, 6, 47, 50, 126, 151, 226, 250, 401, 427, 473, 477, 486, 497, 585, 624, 644, 678, 685, 687, 758, 896, 897, 936, 1076, 1399, 1509, 1690, 1782, 1830, 1837, 1842, 1938, 1983, 2009, 2196, 2241, 2285, 2324, ...	2, 35, 333, 368, 391, 422, 436, 554, 641, 674, 721, 847, 874, 1357, 1516, 1604, 1672, 1762, 1886, 1950, 2028, 2153, 2219, 2322, 2405, 2411, ...
131	7, 493, 567, 591, 593, 613, 764, 883, 899, 919, 953, 1219, 1283, 1322, 1343, 1368, 1772, 1968, 2482, ...	48, 96, 281, 420, 577, 806, 1055, 1121, 1124, 1419, 2003, 2442, ...
137	13, 166, 213, 355, 586, 669, 707, 768, 833, 1003, 1105, 1189, 1202, 1314, 1383, 1526, 1594, 1640, 1949, 1999, 2120, 2428, ...	89, 242, 287, 367, 527, 599, 681, 731, 795, 802, 1072, 1162, 1329, 1556, 1589, 1612, 1754, 1779, 2194, 2394, 2397, ...
139	11, 50, 221, 415, 521, 577, 580, 668, 717, 720, 738, 902, 1389, 1392, 1581, 1650, 1731, 1765, 1913, 1941, 1944, 2220, 2306, 2378, ...	30, 84, 285, 294, 554, 629, 710, 739, 775, 951, 1023, 1161, 1372, 1480, 1515, 1541, 1612, 1653, 1755, 1837, 1849, 2067, 2221, 2313, ...
149	5, 7, 68, 79, 106, 260, 319, 502, 550, 779, 855, 1067, 1385, 1423, 1434, 1595, 1688, 1693, 1723, 1735, 1873, 1954, 1993, 2098, 2099, 2438, ...	16, 39, 51, 105, 171, 184, 221, 236, 273, 338, 370, 380, 630, 776, 927, 990, 1248, 1294, 1427, 1431, 1471, 1628, 1866, 1933, 2219, 2275, ...
151	29, 55, 57, 160, 176, 222, 255, 364, 427, 439, 642, 660, 697, 863, 1066, 1124, 1148, 1207, 1309, 1365, 1382, 1480, 1486, 2076, 2145, 2241, 2270, 2273, ...	147, 198, 334, 368, 371, 516, 727, 1114, 1216, 1324, 1360, 1417, 1526, 1557, 1570, 1699, 1748, 1785, 1805, 2117, 2182, 2342, 2378, ...
157	56, 71, 76, 181, 190, 317, 338, 413, 426, 609, 694, 794, 797, 960, 1008, 1035, 1071, 1165, 1285, 1294, 1301, 1306, 1404, 1483, 1549, 1560, 1787, 2227, 2281, 2474, ...	19, 33, 45, 132, 133, 157, 214, 281, 495, 679, 749, 777, 792, 993, 1205, 1400, 1489, 1631, 1673, 1772, 1850, 1906, 2053, 2056, 2071, 2086, 2215, 2433, 2458, ...
163	30, 62, 118, 139, 147, 291, 456, 755, 834, 888, 902, 924, 1033, 1086, 1664, 1700, 1840, 1924, 1969, 1970, 2111, 2196, 2278, ...	19, 52, 126, 148, 197, 248, 258, 374, 386, 542, 551, 644, 688, 737, 805, 878, 928, 1134, 1145, 1156, 1237, 1398, 1426, 1492, 1516, 1720, 2145, 2410, ...
167	44, 45, 127, 175, 182, 403, 449, 453, 476, 571, 582, 700, 749, 764, 929, 957, 1048, 1259, 1433, 1563, 1599, 1602, 1908, 2085, 2159, 2489, ...	2, 38, 62, 85, 178, 259, 278, 360, 419, 583, 735, 860, 883, 925, 934, 1073, 1202, 1227, 1558, 1591, 1705, 1742, 1788, 1871, 1953, 1966, 2101, 2226, 2234, 2385, 2483, ...
173	60, 62, 139, 141, 303, 313, 368, 425, 542, 663, 1147, 1219, 1407, 1453, 1699, 1734, 2232, 2347, 2417, ...	16, 30, 281, 326, 390, 695, 732, 815, 1338, 1675, 1718, 1822, 2163, 2219, ...
179	304, 478, 586, 942, 952, 975, 1138, 1858, 2003, 2284, 2498, ...	11, 55, 255, 289, 321, 467, 869, 1230, 1435, 1447, 1587, 1927, 2024, 2160, 2234, 2475, ...
181	5, 37, 171, 427, 509, 571, 618, 665, 671, 786, 1028, 1187, 1542, 1677, 2044, 2180, 2440, ...	289, 536, 584, 632, 656, 670, 1012, 1025, 1042, 1133, 1288, 1461, 1605, 1651, 1720, 1945, 2121, 2143, 2212, 2242, 2482, 2484, ...
191	74, 214, 416, 477, 595, 664, 699, 712, 743, 924, 1148, 1238, 1742, 1877, 2038, 2056, 2195, 2292, 2446, ...	2, 36, 76, 527, 575, 602, 1136, 1206, 1488, 1495, 1644, 1875, 2111, ...
193	118, 301, 486, 554, 637, 673, 736, 1074, 1198, 1568, 1767, 1824, 1938, 1970, 2200, 2275, 2322, ...	12, 408, 495, 606, 657, 916, 1013, 1117, 1179, 1237, 1528, 1558, 1732, 1742, 1909, 2117, 2456, ...
197	33, 236, 248, 262, 335, 363, 388, 593, 763, 813, 1038, 1053, 1348, 1358, 1426, 1543, 1736, 1925, 1977, 1985, 2036, 2152, 2179, 2250, 2331, ...	52, 54, 192, 387, 441, 639, 814, 1239, 1350, 1441, 1514, 1542, 1614, 1674, 1678, 1742, 1862, 2180, 2307, 2332, ...
199	156, 362, 383, 401, 442, 630, 645, 689, 740, 921, 936, 944, 983, 988, 1120, 1189, 1208, 1642, 1785, 2134, 2213, ...	2, 136, 207, 307, 328, 424, 467, 489, 669, 749, 808, 830, 1096, 1255, 1262, 1341, 1607, 1631, 1642, 1871, 1882, 1885, 1895, 2149, 2153, 2423, ...
211	46, 57, 354, 478, 539, 581, 653, 829, 835, 977, 1084, 1109, 1148, 1318, 1375, 1693, 1821, 1875, 1981, 2026, 2145, 2268, 2278, 2407, 2454, ...	66, 69, 290, 642, 661, 764, 841, 959, 982, 1173, 1337, 1456, 1515, 1590, 1680, 1703, 1780, 1792, 2292, 2463, ...
223	183, 186, 219, 221, 661, 749, 905, 914, 1027, 1362, 1400, 1622, 1840, 1847, 2069, 2104, 2181, ...	9, 46, 52, 108, 235, 361, 508, 591, 699, 736, 746, 781, 910, 924, 928, 1014, 1078, 1200, 1345, 1506, 1550, 1879, 1932, 2024, 2182, 2376, 2449, ...
227	72, 136, 235, 240, 251, 322, 350, 500, 523, 556, 577, 671, 688, 743, 967, 1119, 1138, 1207, 1218, 1340, 1447, 1519, 1551, 1645, 1783, 1905, 2093, 2492, ...	22, 26, 57, 80, 129, 178, 246, 401, 502, 832, 926, 1009, 1011, 1162, 1301, 1313, 1321, 1348, 1352, 1354, 1419, 1884, 1948, 2122, 2154, 2155, 2162, 2182, 2298, 2316, 2490, ...
229	606, 725, 754, 858, 950, 1582, 1605, 1749, 1897, 2225, 2263, 2314, 2323, 2418, 2451, 2488, ...	5, 11, 55, 101, 202, 444, 472, 843, 1012, 1016, 1065, 1129, 1551, 1588, 1626, 1741, 2312, 2332, 2447, ...
233	602, 1394, 1397, 2266, ...	489, 786, 1092, 1167, 1524, 1677, 1917, 1923, ...
239	223, 260, 367, 474, 564, 862, 1431, 1740, ...	69, 126, 213, 490, 693, 845, 1507, 1579, 1655, 2302, ...
241	115, 163, 223, 265, 270, 330, 689, 849, 1014, 1030, 1431, 1564, 1827, 1980, 2090, 2306, 2419, ...	137, 218, 346, 622, 679, 694, 768, 886, 948, 1018, 1080, 1640, 1722, 1762, 1790, 1802, 1899, 2023, 2156, 2200, ...
251	37, 246, 267, 618, 933, 1122, 2371, ...	16, 43, 219, 308, 443, 567, 648, 747, 811, 1732, 1762, 1848, 2395, 2474, ...
257	52, 78, 435, 459, 658, 709, 1022, 1027, 1197, 1216, 1254, 1275, 1378, 1490, 1660, 1680, 1954, 2282, 2351, 2494, ...	36, 171, 259, 368, 484, 487, 676, 1056, 1199, 1249, 1303, 1593, 1637, 1950, 2269, 2441, 2454, ...
263	104, 131, 161, 476, 494, 563, 735, 842, 909, 987, 1091, 1120, 1540, 1777, 1908, 2032, 2108, 2148, 2211, 2399, ...	96, 120, 154, 255, 267, 307, 400, 453, 633, 661, 792, 946, 1169, 1329, 1381, 1444, 1619, 1814, 1843, 1886, 2043, 2070, 2303, ...
269	41, 48, 294, 493, 520, 812, 843, 1163, 1751, 1753, 1902, ...	76, 176, 547, 623, 682, 756, 842, 1028, 1048, 1087, 1130, 1132, 1198, 1245, 1489, 1641, 1655, 1718, 1761, 1835, 2205, ...
271	6, 21, 186, 201, 222, 240, 586, 622, 624, 1088, 1205, 1248, 1253, 1401, 1469, 1503, 1782, 1862, 1864, 2121, 2198, 2203, 2235, 2279, 2369, ...	117, 411, 446, 630, 806, 816, 905, 1001, 1372, 1709, 1789, 1935, 2120, ...
277	338, 473, 637, 940, 941, 978, 1605, 2002, 2467, 2485, ...	26, 43, 72, 200, 215, 378, 418, 591, 840, 889, 955, 968, 1699, 1830, 1869, ...
281	217, 446, 606, 618, 790, 864, 1556, 1718, ...	3, 145, 549, 794, 1017, 1284, 1894, ...
283	13, 197, 254, 288, 323, 374, 404, 943, 1108, 1363, 1493, 1732, 1950, 1978, 2375, 2396, 2408, 2465, ...	159, 172, 232, 322, 323, 370, 387, 463, 647, 727, 866, 952, 975, 991, 1054, 1095, 1464, 1746, 1776, 1878, 2232, 2315, 2418, 2440, ...
293	136, 388, 471, 1283, 1772, 1916, 2420, ...	10, 82, 100, 115, 122, 485, 899, 1135, 1457, 1791, 2161, ...
307	220, 235, 316, 354, 383, 461, 1700, 1793, 2027, 2136, 2164, 2387, ...	16, 94, 353, 482, 515, 917, 1181, 1554, 1757, 1789, 1904, 2057, 2363, 2416, 2440, ...
311	162, 580, 977, 1205, 1565, 1569, 1847, 2310, ...	209, 342, 443, 493, 775, 836, 925, 1038, 1297, 1542, 1551, 1604, 1866, 1916, 1971, 2095, 2404, ...
313	35, 103, 271, 463, 617, 1324, 2201, 2359, ...	2, 62, 199, 230, 298, 522, 904, 976, 2129, 2176, 2380, 2491, ...
317	10, 12, 149, 193, 275, 392, 544, 558, 617, 717, 874, 1037, 1087, 1523, 1717, 1830, 2006, 2053, 2088, 2122, 2306, 2382, 2447, 2474, ...	16, 77, 127, 144, 148, 249, 454, 668, 920, 1010, 1095, 1195, 1415, 1670, 1760, 2133, ...
331	218, 247, 495, 535, 958, 1116, 1302, 1344, 1355, 1451, 1525, 1538, 1804, 1841, 1905, 2154, 2232, 2283, ...	23, 46, 161, 302, 341, 511, 516, 823, 832, 921, 1611, 1661, 2478, 2489, ...
337	19, 101, 111, 347, 405, 488, 572, 600, 1257, 1353, 1452, 1576, 1995, 2132, 2203, 2376, ...	273, 301, 368, 1057, 1376, 2191, ...
347	26, 50, 164, 178, 419, 666, 727, 744, 875, 904, 1256, 1280, 1330, 1354, 1462, 1630, 1697, 1733, 2126, ...	2, 5, 21, 26, 291, 586, 849, 1417, 1477, 1540, 1897, 2204, 2307, 2352, ...
349	39, 48, 580, 616, 650, 741, 1535, 1639, 1897, 1915, 2109, 2138, 2143, 2442, ...	460, 640, 663, 918, 931, 982, 1120, 1153, 1255, 1648, 2120, 2154, 2317, ...
353	12, 134, 166, 201, 639, 734, 816, 1411, 1962, 2133, 2272, ...	22, 137, 238, 824, 964, 991, 1223, 1262, 1330, 1391, 1759, 1768, 2096, 2235, ...
359	22, 204, 426, 542, 552, 1113, 2191, 2288, ...	3, 61, 84, 362, 491, 590, 672, 1062, 1094, 1353, 2100, 2213, ...
367	67, 755, 889, 1052, 1149, 1242, 1313, 1329, 1440, 1543, 1644, 1708, 1745, 1749, 2280, 2335, ...	36, 151, 274, 621, 864, 896, 955, 956, 1430, 1442, 2001, 2202, 2265, ...
373	120, 167, 1211, 1248, 1329, 1464, 1488, 2396, ...	28, 380, 553, 781, 1051, 1057, 1190, 1492, 1915, 2290, 2335, ...
379	195, 562, 697, 1071, 1147, 1232, 1731, 1826, 1881, 1898, 2044, 2052, 2122, 2227, 2451, ...	329, 330, 392, 420, 573, 576, 645, 850, 998, 1306, 1323, 1706, 2110, 2125, 2340, 2429, ...
383	48, 99, 164, 299, 348, 359, 403, 475, 662, 748, 797, 847, 873, 940, 1233, 1250, 1277, 1488, 1589, 1684, 1921, 2127, ...	43, 111, 165, 225, 253, 326, 410, 533, 715, 879, 903, 1099, 1135, 1251, 1465, 1535, 1556, 1663, 1724, 1787, 1959, ...
389	54, 105, 410, 430, 451, 715, 774, 789, 1105, 1395, 1433, 1489, 1717, 1855, ...	69, 542, 629, 745, 840, 1414, 1432, 1740, 1997, 2183, 2327, 2450, 2458, ...
397	463, 627, 705, 1105, 1171, 2199, 2332, 2388, ...	86, 91, 260, 293, 446, 657, 1314, 1939, 2191, 2258, 2366, 2421, 2475, ...
401	38, 224, 347, 482, 490, 1040, 1050, 1358, 1418, 1563, 1622, 1835, 1979, 2075, 2317, 2423, ...	271, 485, 919, 1017, 1039, 1178, 1264, 1358, 1428, 1616, 1951, 2078, 2335, ...
409	41, 493, 659, 1049, 2476, ...	396, 429, 503, 1072, 1189, 1309, 1579, 1617, 1827, 1890, 2367, ...
419	17, 356, 946, 1829, 2133, ...	28, 177, 274, 572, 768, 817, 2164, ...
421	808, 835, 842, 1438, 2007, 2162, 2195, 2481, ...	83, 272, 329, 891, 1110, 1278, 1312, 1423, 1644, 1717, 1984, 2041, 2151, 2169, 2199, ...
431	404, 760, 1004, 1326, 1353, 1765, 2038, 2439, ...	302, 344, 670, 785, 837, 1171, 1247, 1706, ...
433	46, 425, 555, 845, 873, 931, 1110, 1593, 1640, 1697, 1981, 2138, 2385, ...	209, 290, 582, 639, 641, 746, 783, 1021, 1104, 1536, 1776, 2066, ...
439	76, 92, 221, 722, 753, 1322, 1544, 1616, 1744, 1916, 2054, 2283, ...	11, 80, 203, 286, 389, 942, 1078, 1344, 1360, 1543, 1565, 1600, 1902, 2179, ...
443	793, 1088, ...	300, 925, 1002, ...
449	38, 108, 155, 209, 223, 675, 757, 2020, 2133, 2316, ...	159, 181, 372, 454, 794, 934, 1153, 1200, 1249, 2026, ...
457	28, 407, 414, 721, 1523, 1671, 1751, 1818, 2044, 2216, 2386, ...	79, 348, 439, 663, 676, 695, 1178, 1653, 1740, 2135, 2190, 2216, 2330, 2404, 2496, ...
461	215, 228, 251, 414, 645, 651, 721, 749, 985, 1312, 1453, 1956, 2229, ...	31, 100, 573, 576, 708, 716, 879, 1028, 1069, 1150, 1247, 1391, 1433, 1666, 1942, 2151, ...
463	37, 336, 652, 832, 1153, 1165, 1194, 1354, 1707, 2329, 2396, 2448, ...	331, 514, 1068, 1302, 1525, 1760, 1998, 2321, 2407, ...
467	236, 675, 783, 850, 880, 962, 1079, 1679, 1877, 1886, 1932, 2113, 2225, ...	52, 87, 130, 642, 745, 1318, 2037, ...
479	59, 304, 402, 500, 737, 901, 1149, 1212, 1670, 1713, 2147, 2171, 2270, ...	176, 191, 693, 1495, 1555, 1667, 1822, 2069, 2454, ...
487	15, 257, 286, 416, 620, 715, 830, 911, 958, ...	3, 492, 1054, 1619, 1646, 1880, 1925, 2080, 2420, ...
491	514, 1315, 1840, ...	28, 79, 1148, 1427, 1978, 2161, 2173, 2479, ...
499	260, 703, 1406, 2282, 2410, ...	217, 305, 314, 762, 977, 1779, 2340, ...
503	498, 537, 547, 604, 717, 824, 899, 967, 2076, 2178, ...	14, 35, 43, 69, 878, 1239, 1284, 1484, 1517, ...
509	6, 86, 182, 864, 1194, 1553, 1592, 1939, 2382, ...	410, 1206, 1301, 2204, ...
521	2, 37, 461, 578, 618, 842, 998, 1053, 1131, 2103, 2128, ...	252, 567, 670, 682, 990, 1002, 1322, 1376, 1445, 1605, 1901, 2216, 2457, ...
523	95, 806, 954, 2429, ...	718, 924, 994, 1439, 1462, 1954, 2234, 2426, ...
541	3, 40, 70, 242, 252, 445, 559, 643, 651, 761, 852, 1432, 1479, 1540, 1595, 1962, 2044, 2426, ...	164, 315, 368, 666, 817, 865, 958, 1079, 1193, 1228, 1596, 1644, ...
547	473, 527, 672, 1109, 1730, 1824, 1994, ...	9, 30, 83, 245, 561, 832, 1108, 1439, 1532, 1629, 1632, ...
557	417, 984, 1180, 1321, 1348, 1757, 2020, 2039, ...	11, 262, 2403, ...
563	123, 254, 611, 772, 902, 1153, 1285, 1396, 2130, 2236, 2429, ...	432, 487, 1068, 1098, 1252, 1463, 1539, 1602, 1660, 1726, 1801, 1851, ...
569	30, 114, 662, 762, 800, 1190, 1216, 1568, 1809, 1820, 2154, ...	173, 254, 378, 937, 1480, 1987, 2209, 2352, ...
571	89, 147, 339, 561, 929, 1093, 1177, ...	93, 338, 1228, 1361, 1381, 1423, 1683, 2291, 2416, 2487, ...
577	88, 140, 159, 199, 1389, 1492, 1495, 1697, ...	3, 138, 363, 1776, 1788, ...
587	236, 666, 838, 843, 893, 1062, 1105, 1709, 1710, 1714, 1780, 1789, 1837, 1864, 2052, 2190, 2343, 2458, ...	23, 192, 201, 529, 674, 950, 1043, 1912, 1982, 2254, 2295, 2350, ...
593	76, 335, 798, 1531, 1549, 2077, 2446, ...	201, 466, 938, ...
599	124, 133, 381, 433, 530, 933, 1290, 1549, 1977, ...	176, 499, 580, 615, 1167, 1732, 2285, ...
601	2061, ...	93, 154, 239, 521, 1456, 1677, 1868, 2071, 2193, 2344, ...
607	2, 805, 973, 1075, 1394, 1651, 1692, 1739, 2472, ...	621, 1262, 1271, 2222, ...
613	192, 209, 345, 395, 641, 644, 886, 1322, 1845, 1871, 1937, 2300, 2376, ...	94, 244, 259, 300, 323, 663, 950, 1875, 1881, ...
617	187, 305, 635, 674, 1394, 1530, 1848, ...	35, 264, 451, 894, 1156, 1461, 2255, ...
619	5, 226, 323, 448, 853, 1970, 2418, ...	154, 271, 785, 1082, 1494, 1531, 1919, 2096, 2464, ...
631	39, 65, 665, 1443, 1678, 1949, 2485, ...	19, 477, 892, 1188, 1447, 1673, 2202, 2272, 2333, 2334, 2392, ...
641	1267, 1943, ...	10, 1859, ...
643	190, 638, 950, 1017, 1177, 1469, 2184, 2296, ...	66, 480, 497, 708, 753, 1307, 1396, 1845, 1909, 2273, 2425, 2432, ...
647	321, 935, 1161, 1611, 2179, ...	172, 503, 844, 880, 1196, 1197, 2113, 2222, 2264, 2351, 2364, ...
653	24, ...	803, 1235, 1730, 1959, ...
659	79, 340, 927, 2469, ...	1509, 1660, 1991, ...
661	24, 50, 57, 732, 797, 1148, 1338, 1382, 1424, 1520, 1534, 2288, 2443, ...	78, 163, 1046, 2023, 2284, 2358, ...
673	102, 190, 425, 859, 1301, 1842, 1974, 2066, ...	104, 493, 494, 888, 1407, 1614, 2092, 2144, 2185, ...
677	101, 772, 1034, 1318, 1377, 1548, 1760, 2076, ...	354, 429, 581, 933, 1092, 1377, 1476, 1480, 1864, 1906, ...
683	500, 501, 1929, 1932, 2248, 2262, ...	289, 478, 529, 955, 958, 1031, 1304, 1559, ...
691	110, 955, 1108, 1660, 1670, 2214, ...	41, 722, 1110, 1854, ...
701	12, 112, 218, 255, 667, 814, 985, 1073, 1492, 1689, 2195, ...	2, 81, 327, 689, 761, 763, 837, 1410, 1435, 1758, 2120, ...
709	114, 271, 549, 821, 1267, 1614, 2072, 2354, ...	20, 35, 42, 88, 219, 1105, 1286, 1723, 1899, ...
719	283, 382, 2211, 2475, ...	430, 999, 1470, ...
727	1004, 1524, 1999, ...	192, 271, 454, 644, 1446, 1914, 2278, 2319, 2417, ...
733	566, 1256, 1386, 1686, 2329, ...	18, 578, 2169, 2208, 2405, ...
739	75, 555, 927, 1649, 1701, 2204, 2233, ...	123, 393, 412, 562, 1871, 1872, ...
743	398, 535, 2194, ...	964, 1974, ...
751	40, 215, 547, 1004, 1051, 1080, 1994, ...	344, 425, 664, 1167, 1771, 1885, 1994, 2064, ...
757	62, 733, 1263, 1459, 1788, 2097, ...	68, 543, 1788, 1804, 1875, ...
761	70, 746, 1264, 2478, ...	1492, 1720, 2224, ...
769	61, 458, 556, 667, 1107, 1491, 2173, ...	149, 158, 457, 642, 908, 1161, 1403, 1958, 2011, 2155, ...
773	1276, 2108, 2186, ...	9, 68, 520, 589, 640, 1256, 1485, 2490, ...
787	368, 390, 602, 1489, 2279, 2387, ...	439, 496, 1019, 1096, 1307, 1484, 1562, 1569, ...
797	477, 1353, 1541, 2439, ...	20, 119, 485, 630, 835, 1282, 1398, 1828, 1916, 2055, 2171, 2298, ...
809	818, 1666, 1889, ...	154, 157, 176, 2211, ...
811	342, 445, 588, 794, 1335, 1455, 1576, 1999, 2233, 2440, ...	6, 109, 374, 614, 765, 1575, 1987, ...
821	217, 700, 816, 923, 997, 1138, 2012, 2249, 2385, 2468, ...	395, 606, 649, 816, 1189, 1222, 1307, 1491, 1931, ...
823	168, 1305, 1438, 2268, ...	383, 645, 808, 1895, 2189, 2260, ...
827	119, 719, 724, 1288, 1431, 2476, ...	179, 236, 631, 815, 1373, 1906, 2124, 2399, ...
829	202, 271, 753, 1054, 2228, 2332, 2362, 2497, ...	30, 81, 437, 475, 817, 1850, 1962, 1991, 2147, ...
839	55, 300, 558, 567, 612, 756, 1476, 1796, 2123, 2150, ...	104, 375, 634, 922, 1248, ...
853	430, 1889, 1970, 1997, ...	241, 452, 1779, 2161, ...
857	22, 146, 1220, 1361, 1871, ...	26, 35, 223, 250, 270, 1373, 1646, 1815, ...
859	438, 987, 1118, 1867, 2006, 2091, ...	518, 825, 957, 1263, 1284, 1510, 1542, 1670, 2278, ...
863	1539, 2068, ...	292, 323, 684, 1266, 1383, 1438, 1792, 1893, 2198, 2314, ...
877	865, 962, 2047, 2247, ...	513, 1831, 1936, 2348, ...
881	275, 695, 830, 842, 1267, 1696, 2021, ...	367, 590, 1397, 1567, 2257, ...
883	13, 254, 548, 1404, 1557, ...	209, 945, 1483, ...
887	340, 566, 607, 964, 1236, 1565, 2196, 2480, ...	444, 658, 663, 674, 1374, 1467, 1565, 1826, 2406, ...
907	11, 476, 1588, 1885, 2099, ...	... (the smallest such base $b$ is 2631)
911	178, 744, 809, 945, 1983, ...	511, 1582, ...
919	908, 1248, 2071, ...	13, 931, 938, 1060, 1384, 1858, 1896, ...
929	5, 827, 927, 2086, ...	520, 1327, 1858, ...
937	828, 873, 904, ...	60, 198, 578, 1011, 1930, 2247, ...
941	240, 417, 754, ...	18, 947, 1657, ...
947	252, 661, 1257, 1288, 1629, ...	394, 612, 2364, 2413, ...
953	232, ...	1759, 2108, ...
967	257, 427, 751, 1407, 1835, ...	17, 258, 751, 930, 1020, 1266, 1328, 1783, 2140, ...
971	218, 832, 1464, ...	84, 1528, 1533, 1756, 1793, 1803, 1951, ...
977	1625, 1627, 1881, 1956, 1972, 2067, ...	1321, 2308, ...
983	147, 422, ...	107, 319, 497, 506, 650, 1423, 1650, 2215, ...
991	13, 133, 415, 893, 1300, ...	54, 59, 1363, 2309, ...
997	501, 575, 591, 654, 891, 892, 1496, 1740, 2065, 2067, ...	223, 1051, 1424, 1774, 1882, 1928, 2246, 2302, ...

== List of repunit primes base b ==
Smallest prime $p>2$ such that $R_p(b)$ is prime are (start with $b=2$, 0 if no such $p$ exists)

3, 3, 0, 3, 3, 5, 3, 0, 19, 17, 3, 5, 3, 3, 0, 3, 25667, 19, 3, 3, 5, 5, 3, 0, 7, 3, 5, 5, 5, 7, 0, 3, 13, 313, 0, 13, 3, 349, 5, 3, 1319, 5, 5, 19, 7, 127, 19, 0, 3, 4229, 103, 11, 3, 17, 7, 3, 41, 3, 7, 7, 3, 5, 0, 19, 3, 19, 5, 3, 29, 3, 7, 5, 5, 3, 41, 3, 3, 5, 3, 0, 23, 5, 17, 5, 11, 7, 61, 3, 3, 4421, 439, 7, 5, 7, 3343, 17, 13, 3, 0, 3, ... (sequence A128164 in the OEIS)

Smallest prime $p>2$ such that $R_p(-b)$ is prime are (start with $b=2$, 0 if no such $p$ exists)

3, 3, 3, 5, 3, 3, 0, 3, 5, 5, 5, 3, 7, 3, 3, 7, 3, 17, 5, 3, 3, 11, 7, 3, 11, 0, 3, 7, 139, 109, 0, 5, 3, 11, 31, 5, 5, 3, 53, 17, 3, 5, 7, 103, 7, 5, 5, 7, 1153, 3, 7, 21943, 7, 3, 37, 53, 3, 17, 3, 7, 11, 3, 0, 19, 7, 3, 757, 11, 3, 5, 3, 7, 13, 5, 3, 37, 3, 3, 5, 3, 293, 19, 7, 167, 7, 7, 709, 13, 3, 3, 37, 89, 71, 43, 37, (>800000), 19, 7, 3, 7, ... (sequence A084742 in the OEIS)

$b$	numbers $n$ such that $R_n(b)$ is prime (some large terms are only corresponding to probable primes, these $n$ are checked up to ≥200000)	OEIS sequence
−101	7, 229, 91463, 166849, ...	
−100	3, 293, 461, 11867, 90089, ...	A347138
−99	7, 37, 41, 71, 357779, ...	
−98	2^{*}, 19, 101, 78797, 114859, 189619, ...	
−97	... (the smallest such number $n$ (if exists) is greater than 800000)	
−96	37, 103, 131, 263, 32369, ...	
−95	43, 93377, 127583, ...	
−94	71, 307, 613, 1787, 3793, 10391, ...	
−93	89, 571, 601, 3877, ...	
−92	37, 59, 113, ...	
−91	3, 11, 43, 397, 21529, 37507, 61879, ...	
−90	2^{*}, 3, 47, ...	
−89	13, 59, 137, 1103, 4423, 82609, 101363, ...	
−88	709, 1373, 61751, 208739, ...	
−87	7, 467, 43189, ...	
−86	7, 17, 397, 7159, 103471, 123677, ...	
−85	167, 3533, 48677, 138647, ...	
−84	2^{*}, 7, 13, 139, 359, 971, 1087, 3527, ...	
−83	19, 31, 37, 43, 421, 547, 3037, 8839, ...	
−82	293, 1279, 97151, ...	
−81	3, 5, 701, 829, 1031, 1033, 7229, 19463, 370421, ...	A350036
−80	2^{*}, 5, 13, 227, 439, 191953, 192133, 228419, ...	
−79	3, 107, 457, 491, 2011, 379703, ...	
−78	3, 7, 31, 661, 4217, ...	
−77	37, 317, ...	
−76	3, 5, 191, 269, 23557, 165947, ...	
−75	5, 83, 6211, ...	
−74	2^{*}, 13, 31, 37, 109, 17383, 167311, ...	
−73	7, 39181, 280697, ...	
−72	2^{*}, 3, 7, 79, 277, 3119, ...	
−71	5, 37, 5351, 7499, 68539, 77761, ...	
−70	3, 61, 97, 13399, 42737, ...	
−69	11, 211, 239, 389, 503, 4649, 24847, ...	
−68	2^{*}, 757, 773, 71713, 294947, ...	
−67	3, 2347, 2909, 3203, 203431, 239053, ...	
−66	7, 17, 211, 643, 28921, 58741, 63079, 67349, ...	
−65	19, 31, ...	
−64	(none)	
−63	3, 37, 41, 2131, 4027, 22283, 51439, 102103, 188147, 238481, ...	
−62	2^{*}, 11, 29, 167, 313, 16567, 38699, 170539, 286483, ...	
−61	7, 41, 359, 17657, ...	
−60	2^{*}, 3, 937, 1667, 3917, 18077, 31393, 119083, ...	
−59	17, 43, 991, 33613, 203309, ...	
−58	3, 17, 1447, 11003, ...	
−57	53, 227, 18211, 20231, 22973, 87719, 111119, ...	
−56	37, 107, 1063, 4019, ...	
−55	3, 5, 179, 229, 1129, 1321, 2251, 15061, 299087, ...	
−54	2^{*}, 7, 19, 67, 197, 991, 99563, 128189, 164839, ...	
−53	21943, 24697, 158341, ...	
−52	7, 163, 197, 223, 467, 5281, 52901, 85259, ...	
−51	3, 149, 3253, ...	
−50	1153, 26903, 56597, ...	A309413
−49	7, 19, 37, 83, 1481, 12527, 20149, ...	A237052
−48	2^{*}, 5, 17, 131, 84589, ...	A236530
−47	5, 19, 23, 79, 1783, 7681, ...	A236167
−46	7, 23, 59, 71, 107, 223, 331, 2207, 6841, 94841, ...	A235683
−45	103, 157, 37159, ...	A309412
−44	2^{*}, 7, 41233, ...	A309411
−43	5, 7, 19, 251, 277, 383, 503, 3019, 4517, 9967, 29573, ...	A231865
−42	2^{*}, 3, 709, 1637, 17911, 127609, 172663, ...	A231604
−41	17, 691, 113749, ...	A309410
−40	53, 67, 1217, 5867, 6143, 11681, 29959, ...	A229663
−39	3, 13, 149, 15377, ...	A230036
−38	2^{*}, 5, 167, 1063, 1597, 2749, 3373, 13691, 83891, 131591, ...	A229524
−37	5, 7, 2707, 163193, ...	A309409
−36	31, 191, 257, 367, 3061, 110503, 1145393, ...	A229145
−35	11, 13, 79, 127, 503, 617, 709, 857, 1499, 3823, 135623, 280979, ...	A185240
−34	3, 294277, 735439, ...	A366680
−33	5, 67, 157, 12211, 313553, ...	A185230
−32	2^{*} (no others)	
−31	109, 461, 1061, 50777, ...	A126856
−30	2^{*}, 139, 173, 547, 829, 2087, 2719, 3109, 10159, 56543, 80599, ...	A071382
−29	7, 112153, 151153, ...	A291906
−28	3, 19, 373, 419, 491, 1031, 83497, 223381, ...	A071381
−27	(none)	
−26	11, 109, 227, 277, 347, 857, 2297, 9043, 501409, ...	A071380
−25	3, 7, 23, 29, 59, 1249, 1709, 1823, 1931, 3433, 8863, 43201, 78707, ...	A057191
−24	2^{*}, 7, 11, 19, 2207, 2477, 4951, 821497, ...	A057190
−23	11, 13, 67, 109, 331, 587, 24071, 29881, 44053, ...	A057189
−22	3, 5, 13, 43, 79, 101, 107, 227, 353, 7393, 50287, ...	A057188
−21	3, 5, 7, 13, 37, 347, 17597, 59183, 80761, 210599, 394579, ...	A057187
−20	2^{*}, 5, 79, 89, 709, 797, 1163, 6971, 140053, 177967, 393257, 463511, ...	A057186
−19	17, 37, 157, 163, 631, 7351, 26183, 30713, 41201, 77951, 476929, ...	A057185
−18	2^{*}, 3, 7, 23, 73, 733, 941, 1097, 1933, 4651, 481147, ...	A057184
−17	7, 17, 23, 47, 967, 6653, 8297, 41221, 113621, 233689, 348259, ...	A057183
−16	3, 5, 7, 23, 37, 89, 149, 173, 251, 307, 317, 30197, 1025393, ...	A057182
−15	3, 7, 29, 1091, 2423, 54449, 67489, 551927, 1841911, 1848811, ...	A057181
−14	2^{*}, 7, 53, 503, 1229, 22637, 1091401, 1385203, 1522841, 2307467, ...	A057180
−13	3, 11, 17, 19, 919, 1151, 2791, 9323, 56333, 1199467, ...	A057179
−12	2^{*}, 5, 11, 109, 193, 1483, 11353, 21419, 21911, 24071, 106859, 139739, 495953, ...	A057178
−11	5, 7, 179, 229, 439, 557, 6113, 223999, 327001, 2264611, ...	A057177
−10	5, 7, 19, 31, 53, 67, 293, 641, 2137, 3011, 268207, 1600787, ...	A001562
−9	3, 59, 223, 547, 773, 1009, 1823, 3803, 49223, 193247, 703393, 860029, ...	A057175
−8	2^{*} (no others)	
−7	3, 17, 23, 29, 47, 61, 1619, 18251, 106187, 201653, 1178033, 1321757, ...	A057173
−6	2^{*}, 3, 11, 31, 43, 47, 59, 107, 811, 2819, 4817, 9601, 33581, 38447, 41341, 131891, 196337, 1313371, ...	A057172
−5	5, 67, 101, 103, 229, 347, 4013, 23297, 30133, 177337, 193939, 266863, 277183, 335429, 1856147, ...	A057171
−4	2^{*}, 3 (no others)	
−3	2^{*}, 3, 5, 7, 13, 23, 43, 281, 359, 487, 577, 1579, 1663, 1741, 3191, 9209, 11257, 12743, 13093, 17027, 26633, 104243, 134227, 152287, 700897, 1205459, 1896463, 2533963, 2674381, 7034611, ...	A007658
−2	3, 4^{*}, 5, 7, 11, 13, 17, 19, 23, 31, 43, 61, 79, 101, 127, 167, 191, 199, 313, 347, 701, 1709, 2617, 3539, 5807, 10501, 10691, 11279, 12391, 14479, 42737, 83339, 95369, 117239, 127031, 138937, 141079, 267017, 269987, 374321, 986191, 4031399, ..., 13347311, 13372531, ..., 15135397, ...	A000978
2	2, 3, 5, 7, 13, 17, 19, 31, 61, 89, 107, 127, 521, 607, 1279, 2203, 2281, 3217, 4253, 4423, 9689, 9941, 11213, 19937, 21701, 23209, 44497, 86243, 110503, 132049, 216091, 756839, 859433, 1257787, 1398269, 2976221, 3021377, 6972593, 13466917, 20996011, 24036583, 25964951, 30402457, 32582657, 37156667, 42643801, 43112609, 57885161, ..., 74207281, ..., 77232917, ..., 82589933, ..., 136279841, ...	A000043
3	3, 7, 13, 71, 103, 541, 1091, 1367, 1627, 4177, 9011, 9551, 36913, 43063, 49681, 57917, 483611, 877843, 2215303, 2704981, 3598867, 7973131, 8530117, ...	A028491
4	2 (no others)	
5	3, 7, 11, 13, 47, 127, 149, 181, 619, 929, 3407, 10949, 13241, 13873, 16519, 201359, 396413, 1888279, 3300593, ..., 4939471, ..., 5154509, ...	A004061
6	2, 3, 7, 29, 71, 127, 271, 509, 1049, 6389, 6883, 10613, 19889, 79987, 608099, 1365019, 3360347, ...	A004062
7	5, 13, 131, 149, 1699, 14221, 35201, 126037, 371669, 1264699, ...	A004063
8	3 (no others)	
9	(none)	
10	2, 19, 23, 317, 1031, 49081, 86453, 109297, 270343, 5794777, 8177207, ...	A004023
11	17, 19, 73, 139, 907, 1907, 2029, 4801, 5153, 10867, 20161, 293831, 1868983, ...	A005808
12	2, 3, 5, 19, 97, 109, 317, 353, 701, 9739, 14951, 37573, 46889, 769543, ...	A004064
13	5, 7, 137, 283, 883, 991, 1021, 1193, 3671, 18743, 31751, 101089, 1503503, ...	A016054
14	3, 7, 19, 31, 41, 2687, 19697, 59693, 67421, 441697, ...	A006032
15	3, 43, 73, 487, 2579, 8741, 37441, 89009, 505117, 639833, ...	A006033
16	2 (no others)	
17	3, 5, 7, 11, 47, 71, 419, 4799, 35149, 54919, 74509, 1990523, ...	A006034
18	2, 25667, 28807, 142031, 157051, 180181, 414269, 1270141, ...	A133857
19	19, 31, 47, 59, 61, 107, 337, 1061, 9511, 22051, 209359, ...	A006035
20	3, 11, 17, 1487, 31013, 48859, 61403, 472709, 984349, ...	A127995
21	3, 11, 17, 43, 271, 156217, 328129, ...	A127996
22	2, 5, 79, 101, 359, 857, 4463, 9029, 27823, ...	A127997
23	5, 3181, 61441, 91943, 121949, 221411, ...	A204940
24	3, 5, 19, 53, 71, 653, 661, 10343, 49307, 115597, 152783, ...	A127998
25	(none)	
26	7, 43, 347, 12421, 12473, 26717, ...	A127999
27	3 (no others)	
28	2, 5, 17, 457, 1423, 115877, ...	A128000
29	5, 151, 3719, 49211, 77237, ...	A181979
30	2, 5, 11, 163, 569, 1789, 8447, 72871, 78857, 82883, ...	A098438
31	7, 17, 31, 5581, 9973, 54493, 101111, 535571, ...	A128002
32	(none)	
33	3, 197, 3581, 6871, 183661, ...	A209120
34	13, 1493, 5851, 6379, 125101, ...	A185073
35	313, 1297, 568453, ...	A348170
36	2 (no others)	
37	13, 71, 181, 251, 463, 521, 7321, 36473, 48157, 87421, 168527, 249341, ...	A128003
38	3, 7, 401, 449, 109037, ...	A128004
39	349, 631, 4493, 16633, 36341, ...	A181987
40	2, 5, 7, 19, 23, 29, 541, 751, 1277, ...	A128005
41	3, 83, 269, 409, 1759, 11731, ...	A239637
42	2, 1319, 337081, ...	A345402
43	5, 13, 6277, 26777, 27299, 40031, 44773, 194119, ...	A240765
44	5, 31, 167, 100511, ...	A294722
45	19, 53, 167, 3319, 11257, 34351, 216551, ...	A242797
46	2, 7, 19, 67, 211, 433, 2437, 2719, 19531, ...	A243279
47	127, 18013, 39623, ...	A267375
48	19, 269, 349, 383, 1303, 15031, 200443, 343901, ...	A245237
49	(none)	
50	3, 5, 127, 139, 347, 661, 2203, 6521, 210319, ...	A245442
51	4229, 35227, ...	
52	2, 103, 257, 4229, 6599, 264697, ...	
53	11, 31, 41, 1571, 25771, 181981, ...	A173767
54	3, 389, 16481, 18371, 82471, ...	
55	17, 41, 47, 151, 839, 2267, 3323, 3631, 5657, 35543, 98419, 179573, ...	
56	7, 157, 2083, 2389, 57787, ...	
57	3, 17, 109, 151, 211, 661, 16963, 22037, 275669, ...	
58	2, 41, 2333, 67853, ...	
59	3, 13, 479, 12251, 169777, ...	
60	2, 7, 11, 53, 173, ...	
61	7, 37, 107, 769, ...	
62	3, 5, 17, 47, 163, 173, 757, 4567, 9221, 10889, ...	
63	5, 3067, 38609, 195893, ...	
64	(none)	
65	19, 29, 631, 375017, ...	
66	2, 3, 7, 19, 19973, ...	
67	19, 367, 1487, 3347, 4451, 10391, 13411, 167449, ...	
68	5, 7, 107, 149, 2767, ...	
69	3, 61, 2371, 3557, 8293, 106397, 178093, ...	
70	2, 29, 59, 541, 761, 1013, 11621, 27631, 326437, ...	
71	3, 31, 41, 157, 1583, 31079, 55079, 72043, 150697, 172259, ...	
72	2, 7, 13, 109, 227, 273149, ...	
73	5, 7, 35401, 110603, ...	
74	5, 191, 3257, 31267, ...	
75	3, 19, 47, 73, 739, 13163, 15607, 93307, ...	
76	41, 157, 439, 593, 3371, 3413, 4549, 157649, ...	
77	3, 5, 37, 15361, 200657, ...	
78	2, 3, 101, 257, 1949, 67141, 245183, ...	
79	5, 109, 149, 659, 28621, ...	
80	3, 7, ...	
81	(none)	
82	2, 23, 31, 41, 7607, 12967, ...	
83	5, 2713, ...	
84	17, 3917, ...	
85	5, 19, 2111, 259159, 275881, ...	
86	11, 43, 113, 509, 1069, 2909, 4327, 40583, ...	
87	7, 17, 121487, 257689, ...	
88	2, 61, 577, 3727, 22811, 40751, ...	
89	3, 7, 43, 47, 71, 109, 571, 11971, 50069, ...	
90	3, 19, 97, 5209, 159463, ...	
91	4421, 20149, ...	
92	439, 13001, 22669, 44491, 271639, ...	
93	7, 4903, ...	
94	5, 13, 37, 1789, 3581, 170371, 241993, ...	
95	7, 523, 9283, 10487, 11483, ...	
96	2, 3343, 46831, ...	
97	17, 37, 1693, 187393, ...	
98	13, 47, 2801, ...	
99	3, 5, 37, 47, 383, 5563, ...	
100	2 (no others)	
101	3, 337, 677, 1181, 6599, ...	

^{*} Repunits with negative base and even n are negative. If their absolute value is prime then they are included above and marked with an asterisk. They are not included in the corresponding OEIS sequences.

For more information, see.
