= Repunit =

Numbers that contain only the digit 1

Repunit prime
- No. of known terms: 11
- Conjectured no. of terms: Infinite
- First terms: 11, 1111111111111111111, 11111111111111111111111
- Largest known term: (10^{8177207}−1)/9
- OEIS index: A004022; Primes of the form (10^n − 1)/9

In recreational mathematics, a repunit is a number like 11, 111, or 1111 that contains only the digit 1 — a more specific type of repdigit. The term stands for "repeated unit" and was coined in 1966 by Albert H. Beiler in his book Recreations in the Theory of Numbers. (Note: Albert H. Beiler coined the term "repunit number" as follows: A number which consists of a repeated of a single digit is sometimes called a monodigit number, and for convenience the author has used the term "repunit number" (repeated unit) to represent monodigit numbers consisting solely of the digit 1.)

A repunit prime is a repunit that is also a prime number. Primes that are repunits in base-2 are Mersenne primes. As of May 2025, the largest known prime number 2^{136,279,841} − 1, the largest probable prime R_{8177207} and the largest elliptic curve primality-proven prime R_{109297} are all repunits in various bases.

== Definition ==
The base-b repunits are defined as (this b can be either positive or negative)

$$R_n^{(b)}\equiv 1 + b + b^2 + \cdots + b^{n-1} = {b^n-1\over{b-1}}\qquad\mbox{for }|b|\ge2, n\ge1.$$

Thus, the number R_{n}^{(b)} consists of n copies of the digit 1 in base-b representation. The first two repunits base-b for n = 1 and n = 2 are

$$R_1^{(b)}={b-1\over{b-1}}= 1 \qquad \text{and} \qquad R_2^{(b)}={b^2-1\over{b-1}}= b+1\qquad\text{for}\ |b|\ge2.$$

In particular, the decimal (base-10) repunits that are often referred to as simply repunits are defined as

$$R_n \equiv R_n^{(10)} = {10^n-1\over{10-1}} = {10^n-1\over9}\qquad\mbox{for } n \ge 1.$$

Thus, the number R_{n} = R_{n}^{(10)} consists of n copies of the digit 1 in base 10 representation. The sequence of repunits base-10 starts with

1, 11, 111, 1111, 11111, 111111, ... (sequence A002275 in the OEIS).

Similarly, the repunits base-2 are defined as

$$R_n^{(2)} = {2^n-1\over{2-1}} = {2^n-1}\qquad\mbox{for }n \ge 1.$$

Thus, the number R_{n}^{(2)} consists of n copies of the digit 1 in base-2 representation. In fact, the base-2 repunits are the well-known Mersenne numbers M_{n} = 2^{n} − 1, they start with

1, 3, 7, 15, 31, 63, 127, 255, 511, 1023, 2047, 4095, 8191, 16383, 32767, 65535, ... (sequence A000225 in the OEIS).

== Properties ==
- Any repunit in any base having a composite number of digits is necessarily composite. For example,
  R_{35}^{(b)} = 11111111111111111111111111111111111 = 11111 × 1000010000100001000010000100001 = 1111111 × 10000001000000100000010000001,

since 35 = 7 × 5 = 5 × 7. This repunit factorization does not depend on the base-b in which the repunit is expressed.
Only repunits (in any base) having a prime number of digits can be prime. This is a necessary but not sufficient condition. For example,

R_{11}^{(2)} = 2^{11} − 1 = 2047 = 23 × 89.

- If p is an odd prime, then every prime q that divides R_{p}^{(b)} must be either 1 plus a multiple of 2p, or a factor of b − 1. For example, a prime factor of R_{29} is 62003 = 1 + 2·29·1069. The reason is that the prime p is the smallest exponent greater than 1 such that q divides b^{p} − 1, because p is prime. Therefore, unless q divides b − 1, p divides the Carmichael function of q, which is even and equal to q − 1.
- Any positive multiple of the repunit R_{n}^{(b)} contains at least n nonzero digits in base-b.
- Any number x is a two-digit repunit in base x − 1.
- The only known numbers that are repunits with at least 3 digits in more than one base simultaneously are 31 (111 in base-5, 11111 in base-2) and 8191 (111 in base-90, 1111111111111 in base-2). The Goormaghtigh conjecture says there are only these two cases.
- Using the pigeon-hole principle it can be easily shown that for relatively prime natural numbers n and b, there exists a repunit in base-b that is a multiple of n. To see this consider repunits R_{1}^{(b)},...,R_{n}^{(b)}. Because there are n repunits but only n−1 non-zero residues modulo n there exist two repunits R_{i}^{(b)} and R_{j}^{(b)} with 1 ≤ i < j ≤ n such that R_{i}^{(b)} and R_{j}^{(b)} have the same residue modulo n. It follows that R_{j}^{(b)} − R_{i}^{(b)} has residue 0 modulo n, i.e. is divisible by n. Since R_{j}^{(b)} − R_{i}^{(b)} consists of j − i ones followed by i zeroes, R_{j}^{(b)} − R_{i}^{(b)} = R_{j−i}^{(b)} × b^{i}. Now n divides the left-hand side of this equation, so it also divides the right-hand side, but since n and b are relatively prime, n must divide R_{j−i}^{(b)}.
- The Feit–Thompson conjecture is that R_{q}^{(p)} never divides R_{p}^{(q)} for two distinct primes p and q.
- Using the Euclidean Algorithm for repunits definition: R_{1}^{(b)} = 1; R_{n}^{(b)} = R_{n−1}^{(b)} × b + 1, any consecutive repunits R_{n−1}^{(b)} and R_{n}^{(b)} are relatively prime in any base-b for any n.
- If m and n have a common divisor d, R_{m}^{(b)} and R_{n}^{(b)} have the common divisor R_{d}^{(b)} in any base-b for any m and n. That is, the repunits of a fixed base form a strong divisibility sequence. As a consequence, If m and n are relatively prime, R_{m}^{(b)} and R_{n}^{(b)} are relatively prime. The Euclidean Algorithm is based on gcd(m, n) = gcd(m − n, n) for m > n. Similarly, using R_{m}^{(b)} − R_{n}^{(b)} × b^{m−n} = R_{m−n}^{(b)}, it can be easily shown that gcd(R_{m}^{(b)}, R_{n}^{(b)}) = gcd(R_{m−n}^{(b)}, R_{n}^{(b)}) for m > n. Therefore, if gcd(m, n) = d, then gcd(R_{m}^{(b)}, R_{n}^{(b)}) = R_{d}^{(b)}.

== Factorization of decimal repunits ==
(Prime factors (or prime powers) parenthesized and colored (red) are "new factors", i. e. the prime factor (or power) divides R_{n} but does not divide R_{k} for all k < n) (sequence A102380 in the OEIS)

| R_{1} = | 1 |
| R_{2} = | (11) |
| R_{3} = | (3) · (37) |
| R_{4} = | 11 · (101) |
| R_{5} = | (41) · (271) |
| R_{6} = | 3 · (7) · 11 · (13) · 37 |
| R_{7} = | (239) · (4649) |
| R_{8} = | 11 · (73) · 101 · (137) |
| R_{9} = | 3^{(2)} · 37 · (333667) |
| R_{10} = | 11 · 41 · 271 · (9091) |

| R_{11} = | (21649) · (513239) |
| R_{12} = | 3 · 7 · 11 · 13 · 37 · 101 · (9901) |
| R_{13} = | (53) · (79) · (265371653) |
| R_{14} = | 11 · 239 · 4649 · (909091) |
| R_{15} = | 3 · (31) · 37 · 41 · 271 · (2906161) |
| R_{16} = | 11 · (17) · 73 · 101 · 137 · (5882353) |
| R_{17} = | (2071723) · (5363222357) |
| R_{18} = | 3^{2} · 7 · 11 · 13 · (19) · 37 · (52579) · 333667 |
| R_{19} = | (1111111111111111111) |
| R_{20} = | 11 · 41 · 101 · 271 · (3541) · 9091 · (27961) |

| R_{21} = | 3 · 37 · (43) · 239 · (1933) · 4649 · (10838689) |
| R_{22} = | 11^{(2)} · (23) · (4093) · (8779) · 21649 · 513239 |
| R_{23} = | (11111111111111111111111) |
| R_{24} = | 3 · 7 · 11 · 13 · 37 · 73 · 101 · 137 · 9901 · (99990001) |
| R_{25} = | 41 · 271 · (21401) · (25601) · (182521213001) |
| R_{26} = | 11 · 53 · 79 · (859) · 265371653 · (1058313049) |
| R_{27} = | 3^{(3)} · 37 · (757) · 333667 · (440334654777631) |
| R_{28} = | 11 · (29) · 101 · 239 · (281) · 4649 · 909091 · (121499449) |
| R_{29} = | (3191) · (16763) · (43037) · (62003) · (77843839397) |
| R_{30} = | 3 · 7 · 11 · 13 · 31 · 37 · 41 · (211) · (241) · 271 · (2161) · 9091 · 2906161 |

Smallest prime factor of R_{n} for n > 1 are

11, 3, 11, 41, 3, 239, 11, 3, 11, 21649, 3, 53, 11, 3, 11, 2071723, 3, 1111111111111111111, 11, 3, 11, 11111111111111111111111, 3, 41, 11, 3, 11, 3191, 3, 2791, 11, 3, 11, 41, 3, 2028119, 11, 3, 11, 83, 3, 173, 11, 3, 11, 35121409, 3, 239, 11, ... (sequence A067063 in the OEIS)

== Repunit primes ==
The definition of repunits was motivated by recreational mathematicians looking for prime factors of such numbers.

It is easy to show that if n is divisible by a, then R_{n}^{(b)} is divisible by R_{a}^{(b)}:

$$R_n^{(b)}=\frac{1}{b-1}\prod_{d|n}\Phi_d(b),$$

where $\Phi_d(x)$ is the $d^\mathrm{th}$ cyclotomic polynomial and d ranges over the divisors of n. For p prime,

$$\Phi_p(x)=\sum_{i=0}^{p-1}x^i,$$

which has the expected form of a repunit when x is substituted with b.

For example, 9 is divisible by 3, and thus R_{9} is divisible by R_{3}—in fact, 111111111 = 111 · 1001001. The corresponding cyclotomic polynomials $\Phi_3(x)$ and $\Phi_9(x)$ are $x^2+x+1$ and $x^6+x^3+1$, respectively. Thus, for R_{n} to be prime, n must necessarily be prime, but it is not sufficient for n to be prime. For example, R_{3} = 111 = 3 · 37 is not prime. Except for this case of R_{3}, p can only divide R_{n} for prime n if p = 2kn + 1 for some k.

=== Decimal repunit primes ===
R_{n} is prime for n = 2, 19, 23, 317, 1031, 49081, 86453, 109297 ... (sequence A004023 in OEIS). On July 15, 2007, Maksym Voznyy announced R_{270343} to be probably prime. Serge Batalov and Ryan Propper found R_{5794777} and R_{8177207} to be probable primes on April 20 and May 8, 2021, respectively. As of their discovery, each was the largest known probable prime. On March 22, 2022, probable prime R_{49081} was eventually proven to be a prime. On May 15, 2023, probable prime R_{86453} was eventually proven to be a prime. On May 26, 2025, probable prime R_{109297} was eventually proven to be a prime.

It has been conjectured that there are infinitely many repunit primes and they seem to occur roughly as often as the prime number theorem would predict: the exponent of the Nth repunit prime is generally around a fixed multiple of the exponent of the (N−1)th.

The prime repunits are a trivial subset of the permutable primes, i.e., primes that remain prime after any permutation of their digits.

Particular properties are

- The remainder of R_{n} modulo 3 is equal to the remainder of n modulo 3. Using 10^{a} ≡ 1 (mod 3) for any a ≥ 0,
  n ≡ 0 (mod 3) ⇔ R_{n} ≡ 0 (mod 3) ⇔ R_{n} ≡ 0 (mod R_{3}),
  n ≡ 1 (mod 3) ⇔ R_{n} ≡ 1 (mod 3) ⇔ R_{n} ≡ R_{1} ≡ 1 (mod R_{3}),
  n ≡ 2 (mod 3) ⇔ R_{n} ≡ 2 (mod 3) ⇔ R_{n} ≡ R_{2} ≡ 11 (mod R_{3}).
  Therefore, 3 | n ⇔ 3 | R_{n} ⇔ R_{3} | R_{n}.
- The remainder of R_{n} modulo 9 is equal to the remainder of n modulo 9. Using 10^{a} ≡ 1 (mod 9) for any a ≥ 0,
  n ≡ r (mod 9) ⇔ R_{n} ≡ r (mod 9) ⇔ R_{n} ≡ R_{r} (mod R_{9}),
  for 0 ≤ r < 9.
  Therefore, 9 | n ⇔ 9 | R_{n} ⇔ R_{9} | R_{n}.

=== Algebra factorization of generalized repunit numbers ===
If b is a perfect power (can be written as m^{n}, with m, n integers, n > 1) differs from 1, then there is at most one repunit in base-b. If n is a prime power (can be written as p^{r}, with p prime, r integer, p, r >0), then all repunit in base-b are not prime aside from R_{p} and R_{2}. R_{p} can be either prime or composite, the former examples, b = −216, −128, 4, 8, 16, 27, 36, 100, 128, 256, etc., the latter examples, b = −243, −125, −64, −32, −27, −8, 9, 25, 32, 49, 81, 121, 125, 144, 169, 196, 216, 225, 243, 289, etc., and R_{2} can be prime (when p differs from 2) only if b is negative, a power of −2, for example, b = −8, −32, −128, −8192, etc., in fact, the R_{2} can also be composite, for example, b = −512, −2048, −32768, etc. If n is not a prime power, then no base-b repunit prime exists, for example, b = 64, 729 (with n = 6), b = 1024 (with n = 10), and b = −1 or 0 (with n any natural number). Another special situation is b = −4k^{4}, with k positive integer, which has the aurifeuillean factorization, for example, b = −4 (with k = 1, then R_{2} and R_{3} are primes), and b = −64, −324, −1024, −2500, −5184, ... (with k = 2, 3, 4, 5, 6, ...), then no base-b repunit prime exists. It is also conjectured that when b is neither a perfect power nor −4k^{4} with k positive integer, then there are infinity many base-b repunit primes.

=== The generalized repunit conjecture ===
A conjecture related to the generalized repunit primes: (the conjecture predicts where is the next generalized Mersenne prime, if the conjecture is true, then there are infinitely many repunit primes for all bases $b$)

For any integer $b$, which satisfies the conditions:

1. $|b|>1$.
2. $b$ is not a perfect power. (since when $b$ is a perfect $r$th power, it can be shown that there is at most one $n$ value such that $\frac{b^n-1}{b-1}$ is prime, and this $n$ value is $r$ itself or a root of $r$)
3. $b$ is not in the form $-4k^4$. (if so, then the number has aurifeuillean factorization)

has generalized repunit primes of the form

$$R_p(b)=\frac{b^p-1}{b-1}$$

for prime $p$, the prime numbers will be distributed near the best fit line

$$Y=G \cdot \log_{|b|}\left( \log_{|b|}\left( R_{(b)}(n) \right) \right)+C,$$

where limit $n\rightarrow\infty$, $G=\frac{1}{e^\gamma}=0.561459483566...$

and there are about

$$\left( \log_e(N)+m \cdot \log_e(2) \cdot \log_e \big( \log_e(N) \big)
+\frac{1}{\sqrt N}-\delta \right) \cdot \frac{e^\gamma}{\log_e(|b|)}$$

base-b repunit primes less than N.

- $e$ is the base of natural logarithm.
- $\gamma$ is Euler–Mascheroni constant.
- $\log_{|b|}$ is the logarithm in base $|b|$
- $R_{(b)}(n)$ is the $n$th generalized repunit prime in baseb (with prime p)
- $C$ is a data fit constant which varies with $b$.
- $\delta=1$ if $b>0$, $\delta=1.6$ if $b<0$.
- $m$ is the largest natural number such that $-b$ is a $2^{m-1}$th power.

We also have the following 3 properties:

1. The number of prime numbers of the form $\frac{b^n-1}{b-1}$ (with prime $p$) less than or equal to $n$ is about $e^\gamma \cdot \log_{|b|}\big(\log_{|b|}(n)\big)$.
2. The expected number of prime numbers of the form $\frac{b^n-1}{b-1}$ with prime $p$ between $n$ and $|b| \cdot n$ is about $e^\gamma$.
3. The probability that number of the form $\frac{b^n-1}{b-1}$ is prime (for prime $p$) is about $\frac{e^\gamma}{p \cdot \log_e(|b|)}$.

== History ==
Although they were not then known by that name, repunits in base-10 were studied by many mathematicians during the nineteenth century in an effort to work out and predict the cyclic patterns of repeating decimals.

It was found very early on that for any prime p greater than 5, the period of the decimal expansion of 1/p is equal to the length of the smallest repunit number that is divisible by p. Tables of the period of reciprocal of primes up to 60,000 had been published by 1860 and permitted the factorization by such mathematicians as Reuschle of all repunits up to R_{16} and many larger ones. By 1880, even R_{17} to R_{36} had been factored and it is curious that, though Édouard Lucas showed no prime below three million had period nineteen, there was no attempt to test any repunit for primality until early in the twentieth century. The American mathematician Oscar Hoppe proved R_{19} to be prime in 1916, and Lehmer and Kraitchik independently found R_{23} to be prime in 1929.

Further advances in the study of repunits did not occur until the 1960s, when computers allowed many new factors of repunits to be found and the gaps in earlier tables of prime periods corrected. R_{317} was found to be a probable prime circa 1966 and was proved prime eleven years later, when R_{1031} was shown to be the only further possible prime repunit with fewer than ten thousand digits. It was proven prime in 1986, but searches for further prime repunits in the following decade consistently failed. However, there was a major side-development in the field of generalized repunits, which produced a large number of new primes and probable primes.

Since 1999, four further probably prime repunits have been found, but it is unlikely that any of them will be proven prime in the foreseeable future because of their huge size.

The Cunningham project endeavours to document the integer factorizations of (among other numbers) the repunits to base 2, 3, 5, 6, 7, 10, 11, and 12.

== Demlo numbers ==
D. R. Kaprekar has defined Demlo numbers as concatenation of a left, middle and right part, where the left and right part must be of the same length (up to a possible leading zero to the left) and must add up to a repdigit number, and the middle part may contain any additional number of this repeated digit. They are named after Demlo railway station (now called Dombivili) 30 miles from Bombay on the then G.I.P. Railway, where Kaprekar started investigating them. He calls Wonderful Demlo numbers those of the form 1, 121, 12321, 1234321, ..., 12345678987654321. The fact that these are the squares of the repunits has led some authors to call Demlo numbers the infinite sequence of these, 1, 121, 12321, ..., 12345678987654321, 1234567900987654321, 123456790120987654321, ..., (sequence A002477 in the OEIS), although one can check these are not Demlo numbers for p = 10, 19, 28, ...

== See also ==
- All one polynomial — Another generalization
- Goormaghtigh conjecture
- Repeating decimal
- Repdigit
- Wagstaff prime — can be thought of as repunit primes with negative base $b = -2$
