= Goormaghtigh conjecture =

Unsolved problem in mathematics
Are there only two solutions to Goormaghtigh's problem?
More unsolved problems in mathematics

In mathematics, the Goormaghtigh conjecture is a conjecture in number theory named for the Belgian mathematician René Goormaghtigh about the solutions of the exponential Diophantine equation

$$\frac{x^m - 1}{x-1} = \frac{y^n - 1}{y-1}$$

with distinct integers $x, y$ larger than one and exponents larger than two. One convention is $x > y > 1$ and in turn $n > m > 2$.

The conjecture states that the only such solutions are

$$\frac{5^3-1}{5-1} = \frac{2^5-1}{2-1} = 31$$

and

$$\frac{90^3-1}{90-1} = \frac{2^{13}-1}{2-1} = 8191.$$

== Representation ==
The fraction of either side of the conjecture exactly represents a finite geometric series. Indeed, $\textstyle\frac{x^m - 1}{x - 1} = \sum_{k=1}^m x^{k-1}$ and so, for example, $31 = 1 + 5 + 25 = 5^0 + 5^1 + 5^2$. As such, the exponential Diophantine equation equates two univariate polynomials, with $m$ terms and highest order $x^{m-1}$ on the left hand side, and $n>m$ on the right.

Alternatively, by cross-multiplication of the fraction's denominators, the equation is equivalently expressed as

$$x^m + x\cdot y^n + y = y^n + y\cdot x^m + x,$$

or similar forms.

Taking logs,

$$\frac{m}{n} = \frac{\ln y}{\ln x}  + O(\tfrac{1}{n})$$

where the remainder term is a $\log_x$ of a ratio of polynomial expressions. Given $x,y,n$, one has $m = n\cdot\log_x y + O(1)$ with the remainder in the range $(-1, 1)$.

=== In terms of repunits ===
Equating two expressions of the form $\textstyle\sum_{k=1}^m \textit{1}\cdot x^{k-1}$, the Goormaghtigh conjecture may also be expressed as saying that there are only two numbers that are repunits with at least three digits in two different bases. The number 31 may be represented as 111 in base 5 or as 11111 in base 2, while 8191 is 111 in base 90 or 1111111111111 in base 2.

== Partial results ==
The conjecture has been subject to extensive computer supported solution search, especially in small cases (investigating it with $x$ in the thousands, or alternatively with $x^m$ below around a dozen digits) or when the fraction is prime (having hundreds of digits). The latter are referred to as "Goormaghtigh primes". Such search is aided by various necessary congruence relations implied by the equation as well as analytical bounding results, some of which are noted below.

The list also contains known results concerning the finiteness of solution sets under further conditions. Regarding results with asymmetric variable use, again beware that the alternative convention $y > x$ is also used in the literature.

- For fixed $x$ and $y$, loose upper bounds for $n$ can be computed from $x$ and, as noted, $m$ then equals an integer close to $n\cdot\log_x y$. He & Togbé (2008) showed that, for each fixed $x$ and $y$, the equation has at most one solution. For fixed $x$ (or $y$), equation has at most 15 solutions, and at most two unless $y$ is either odd prime power times a power of two, or in a finite set, in which case there are at most three solutions. Furthermore, there is at most one solution if the odd part of $y$ is squareful unless $y$ has at most two distinct odd prime factors or $y$ is in another finite set. If $y$ is a power of two, there is at most one solution except for $y=2$, in which case there are two known solutions. In fact, here $\max(m,n)<4^y$ and $x<2^{2^y}$.
- For prime divisors of $x$ and $y$ lying in a given finite set, Balasubramanian and Shorey proved in 1980 that there are only finitely many possible solutions and that these can in principle be effectively computed.
- Davenport, Lewis & Schinzel (1961) showed that, for fixed $m$ and $n$, the equation has only finitely many solutions. The proof of this, however, depends on Siegel's finiteness theorem, which is ineffective.
- Nesterenko & Shorey (1998) showed that in the simplifying situation where the exponents are composed from positive integers as in $m-1=d\,r$ and $n-1=d\,s$ with $d > 1$, the value $\max(x,y,m,n)$ is bounded by an effectively computable constant depending only on $r$ and $s$.
- Yuan (2005) showed that for $m=3$ and odd $n$, the equation has no solution other than the two known ones at all.

== See also ==
- Feit–Thompson conjecture
- Mersenne prime
- Repdigit
- Repunit
