= Repdigit =

Natural number with a decimal representation made of repeated instances of the same digit

In recreational mathematics, a repdigit or sometimes monodigit is a natural number composed of repeated instances of the same digit in a positional number system (often implicitly decimal). The word is a portmanteau of "repeated" and "digit". Examples are 11, 666, 4444, and 999999. All repdigits are palindromic numbers and are multiples of repunits. Other well-known repdigits include the repunit primes and in particular the Mersenne primes (which are repdigits when represented in binary).

Any such number can be represented as follows

  
    
      
        
          
            
              
                n
                n
                …
                n
                n
              
              ⏟
            
          
          
            k
          
        
        =
        
          
            
              (
              n
              n
              −
              n
              
                )
                
                  k
                
              
              −
              
                n
                
                  k
                
              
            
            
              (
              n
              n
              −
              2
              ⋅
              n
              )
              ⋅
              
                n
                
                  (
                  k
                  −
                  2
                  )
                
              
            
          
        
      
    
    {\displaystyle \underbrace {nn\ldots nn} _{k}={\frac {(nn-n)^{k}-n^{k}}{(nn-2\cdot n)\cdot n^{(k-2)}}}}
  

Where nn is the concatenation of n with n. k the number of concatenated n.

nn can be represented mathematically as

$n\cdot\left(10^{\lfloor\log_{10}(n)\rfloor+1}+1\right)$

for n = 23 and k = 5, the formula will look like this

$\frac{(2323 - 23)^5 - 23^5}{(2323 - 2\cdot 23) \cdot 23^{(5-2)}} = \frac{64363429993563657}{27704259} = \underbrace{2323232323}_{5}$

However, 2323232323 is not a repdigit.

Also, any number can be decomposed into the sum and difference of the repdigit numbers.

For example 3453455634 = 3333333333 + (111111111 + (9999999 - (999999 - (11111 + (77 + (2))))))

Repdigits are the representation in base $B$ of the number $x\frac{B^y -1}{B-1}$ where $0<x<B$ is the repeated digit and $1<y$ is the number of repetitions. For example, the repdigit 77777 in base 10 is $7\times\frac{10^5-1}{10-1}$.

A variation of repdigits called Brazilian numbers are numbers that can be written as a repdigit in some base, not allowing the repdigit 11, and not allowing the single-digit numbers (or all natural numbers will be Brazilian). For example, 27 is a Brazilian number because 27 is the repdigit 33 in base 8, while 9 is not a Brazilian number because its only repdigit representation is 11_{8}, not allowed in the definition of Brazilian numbers. The representations of the form 11 are considered trivial and are disallowed in the definition of Brazilian numbers, because all natural numbers n greater than two have the representation 11_{n − 1}. The first twenty Brazilian numbers are

7, 8, 10, 12, 13, 14, 15, 16, 18, 20, 21, 22, 24, 26, 27, 28, 30, 31, 32, 33, ... (sequence A125134 in the OEIS).

On some websites (including imageboards like 4chan), it is considered an auspicious event when the sequentially-assigned ID number of a post is a repdigit, such as 22,222,222, which is one type of "GET" (others including round numbers like 34,000,000, or sequential digits like 12,345,678).

== History ==
The concept of a repdigit has been studied under that name since at least 1974; earlier Beiler (1966) called them "monodigit numbers". The Brazilian numbers were introduced later, in 1994, in the 9th Iberoamerican Mathematical Olympiad that took place in Fortaleza, Brazil. The first problem in this competition, proposed by Mexico, was as follows:

A number n > 0 is called "Brazilian" if there exists an integer b such that 1 < b < n – 1 for which the representation of n in base b is written with all equal digits. Prove that 1994 is Brazilian and that 1993 is not Brazilian.

== Primes and repunits ==
For a repdigit to be prime, it must be a repunit (i.e. the repeating digit is 1) and have a prime number of digits in its base (except trivial single-digit numbers), since, for example, the repdigit 77777 is divisible by 7, in any base > 7. In particular, as Brazilian repunits do not allow the number of digits to be exactly two, Brazilian primes must have an odd prime number of digits. Having an odd prime number of digits is not enough to guarantee that a repunit is prime; for instance, 21 = 111_{4} = 3 × 7 and 111 = 111_{10} = 3 × 37 are not prime. In any given base b, every repunit prime in that base with the exception of 11_{b} (if it is prime) is a Brazilian prime. The smallest Brazilian primes are

7 = 111_{2}, 13 = 111_{3}, 31 = 11111_{2} = 111_{5}, 43 = 111_{6}, 73 = 111_{8}, 127 = 1111111_{2}, 157 = 111_{12}, ... (sequence A085104 in the OEIS)

While the sum of the reciprocals of the prime numbers is a divergent series, the sum of the reciprocals of the Brazilian prime numbers is a convergent series whose value, called the "Brazilian primes constant", is slightly larger than 0.33 (sequence A306759 in the OEIS). This convergence implies that the Brazilian primes form a vanishingly small fraction of all prime numbers. For instance, among the 3.7×10^{10} prime numbers smaller than 10^{12}, only 8.8×10^{4} are Brazilian.

The decimal repunit primes have the form $R_n=\tfrac{10^n-1}9\ \mbox{with } n\ge3$ for the values of n listed in OEIS: A004023. It has been conjectured that there are infinitely many decimal repunit primes. The binary repunits are the Mersenne numbers and the binary repunit primes are the Mersenne primes.

It is unknown whether there are infinitely many Brazilian primes. If the Bateman–Horn conjecture is true, then for every prime number of digits there would exist infinitely many repunit primes with that number of digits (and consequentially infinitely many Brazilian primes). Alternatively, if there are infinitely many decimal repunit primes, or infinitely many Mersenne primes, then there are infinitely many Brazilian primes. Because a vanishingly small fraction of primes are Brazilian, there are infinitely many non-Brazilian primes, forming the sequence

2, 3, 5, 11, 17, 19, 23, 29, 37, 41, 47, 53, ... (sequence A220627 in the OEIS)

If a Fermat number $F_n = 2^{2^n} + 1$ is prime, it is not Brazilian, but if it is composite, it is Brazilian. Contradicting a previous conjecture, Resta, Marcus, Grantham, and Graves found examples of Sophie Germain primes that are Brazilian, the first one is 28792661 = 11111_{73}.

== Non-Brazilian composites and repunit powers ==
The only positive integers that can be non-Brazilian are 1, 6, the primes, and the squares of the primes, for every other number is the product of two factors x and y with 1 < x < y − 1, and can be written as xx in base y − 1. If a square of a prime p^{2} is Brazilian, then prime p must satisfy the Diophantine equation

p^{2} = 1 + b + b^{2} + ... + b^{q-1} with p, q ≥ 3 primes and b >= 2.

Norwegian mathematician Trygve Nagell has proved that this equation has only one solution when p is prime corresponding to (p, b, q) = (11, 3, 5). Therefore, the only squared prime that is Brazilian is 11^{2} = 121 = 11111_{3}. There is also one more nontrivial repunit square, the solution (p, b, q) = (20, 7, 4) corresponding to 20^{2} = 400 = 1111_{7}, but it is not exceptional with respect to the classification of Brazilian numbers because 20 is not prime.

Perfect powers that are repunits with three digits or more in some base b are described by the Diophantine equation of Nagell and Ljunggren

n^{t} = 1 + b + b^{2} +...+ b^{q-1} with b, n, t > 1 and q > 2.

Yann Bugeaud and Maurice Mignotte conjecture that only three perfect powers are Brazilian repunits. They are 121, 343, and 400 (sequence A208242 in the OEIS), the two squares listed above and the cube 343 = 7^{3} = 111_{18}.

== k-Brazilian numbers ==
- The number of ways such that a number n is Brazilian is in OEIS: A220136. Hence, there exist numbers that are non-Brazilian and others that are Brazilian; among these last integers, some are once Brazilian, others are twice Brazilian, or three times, or more. A number that is k times Brazilian is called k-Brazilian number.
- Non-Brazilian numbers or 0-Brazilian numbers are constituted with 1 and 6, together with some primes and some squares of primes. The sequence of the non-Brazilian numbers begins with 1, 2, 3, 4, 5, 6, 9, 11, 17, 19, 23, 25, ... (sequence A220570 in the OEIS).
- The sequence of 1-Brazilian numbers is composed of other primes, the only square of prime that is Brazilian, 121, and composite numbers ≥ 8 that are the product of only two distinct factors such that n = a × b = aa_{b–1} with 1 < a < b – 1. (sequence A288783 in the OEIS).
- The 2-Brazilian numbers (sequence A290015 in the OEIS) consists of composites and only two primes: 31 and 8191. Indeed, according to Goormaghtigh conjecture, these two primes are the only known solutions of the Diophantine equation:
  $p=\frac{x^m - 1}{x-1}=\frac{y^n - 1}{y - 1}$ with x, y > 1 and n, m > 2 :
  - (p, x, y, m, n) = (31, 5, 2, 3, 5) corresponding to 31 = 11111_{2} = 111_{5}, and,
  - (p, x, y, m, n) = (8191, 90, 2, 3, 13) corresponding to 8191 = 1111111111111_{2} = 111_{90}, with 11111111111 is the repunit with thirteen digits 1.
- For each sequence of k-Brazilian numbers, there exists a smallest term. The sequence with these smallest k-Brazilian numbers begins with 1, 7, 15, 24, 40, 60, 144, 120, 180, 336, 420, 360, ... and are in OEIS: A284758. For instance, 40 is the smallest 4-Brazilian number with 40 = 1111_{3} = 55_{7} = 44_{9} = 22_{19}.
- In the Dictionnaire de (presque) tous les nombres entiers, Daniel Lignon proposes that an integer is highly Brazilian if it is a positive integer with more Brazilian representations than any smaller positive integer has. This definition comes from the definition of highly composite numbers created by Srinivasa Ramanujan in 1915. The first numbers highly Brazilian are 1, 7, 15, 24, 40, 60, 120, 180, 336, 360, 720, ... and are exactly in OEIS: A329383. From 360 to 321253732800 (maybe more), there are 80 successive highly composite numbers that are also highly Brazilian numbers, see OEIS: A279930.

== Numerology ==
Some popular media publications have published articles suggesting that repunit numbers have numerological significance, describing them as "angel numbers".

== See also ==
- Six nines in pi
