= Feit–Thompson conjecture =

Conjecture in number theory mathematics

In mathematics, the Feit–Thompson conjecture is a conjecture in number theory, suggested by Walter Feit and John G. Thompson (1962). The conjecture states that there are no distinct prime numbers p and q such that

$\frac{p^{q} - 1}{p - 1}$ divides $\frac{q^{p} - 1}{q - 1}$.

If the conjecture were true, it would greatly simplify the final chapter of the proof (Feit & Thompson 1963) of the Feit–Thompson theorem that every finite group of odd order is solvable. A stronger conjecture that the two numbers are always coprime was disproved by Stephens (1971) with the counterexample p = 17 and q = 3313 with common factor 2pq + 1 = 112643.

It is known that the conjecture is true for q = 2 (Stephens 1971) and q = 3 (Le 2012).

Informal probability arguments suggest that the "expected" number of counterexamples to the Feit–Thompson conjecture is very close to 0, suggesting that the Feit–Thompson conjecture is likely to be true.

== See also ==
- Cyclotomic polynomials
- Goormaghtigh conjecture
