= Elena Salvini Pierallini =

Italian embroiderer and book artist

Elena Salvini Pierallini (1934 Florence – 2024), also known as ESP, was an artist from Florence, Italy, who specialised in embroidery, photography, and book arts. Her work uses imagery from the natural world, medieval iconography from across Europe, and themes associated with ecology, psychology, and philosophy.

== Early life ==
Elena Salvini Pierallini cited extensive travels in her youth as a significant influence on her art. A particularly influential trip occurred when she was 13, during which she visited her cousin in a village near Vallombrosa. She recalled walking for “hours and hours, forgetting about lunch, leaving and finding trails without encountering anyone until sunset”. She soon got lost and was scolded by her cousin when she finally returned home. She comments, “I soon forgot my cousin’s scoldings and remembered that silence, that climb, the aimless march to an unknown destination, without regard for time.” She was trained at the Accademia di Belle Arti di Firenze. From the age of 18, she sought independent travel opportunities to broaden her horizons, traveling with programs offered by the French Institute in Florence, the British Institute of Florence, and the Movimento Forestieri on Via Vecchietti.

Her interest in pursuing art grew out of these travels and her relationship with her mother, Leonella Casini Salvini, a professional embroiderer of tablecloths and tableware, who introduced her to embroidery. During a stay in London, as ESP herself recounts, she noticed that Italian embroidery, especially in the Tuscan style, was prominently displayed at the Victoria and Albert Museum. It was then that she decided to devote her energy to this technique, with her mother's guidance and collaboration. She took a supplementary exam at the Accademia di Belle Arti, where she studied for four years under Gianni Vagnetti. She did not enjoy the process of art school and was often critiqued for her painterly technique. Instead, she fostered a relationship with architect Renato Baldi, who taught her to produce precise architectural drawings and was her mentor and advisor. After graduation, she befriended painters Franca Barbara Frittelli and Ken Tielkemeier.

She had two daughters, Beatrice and Sibilla Pierallini.

== Artistic career and style ==
ESP initially began as a textile artist, working in embroidery from her early teenage years. The embroidery was initially executed by workers under the guidance of her mother, and from the 1970s by ESP herself. She favored subjects such as medieval emblems or narratives of human labor, believing these to reflect European identity. Other themes that inspired her embroidery as it developed into the 1960s and 1970s include nature, animals, the signs of the Zodiac, and the iconography of Romanesque sculpture. Technically, her works had two layers: the top organza layer, which was embroidered, and the bottom silk layer, which was painted.

During the 1990s, ESP began to work with other materials, specifically seashells, re-used plastic, vintage fabrics, and photographs. She produced “image diaries”, in which she brought these mediums together in assemblages and collages, aiming to create one diary page per day. Pierallini used thread to stitch various images together within her diaries, exemplifying her tendency towards construction and unity.

== Notable works ==
The book, Libri in Piedi (Standing Books), written by Pierallini and published in 2002, presents a series of her “artist books”. Each was handcrafted by Pierallini in an accordion style so that they could “stand” on their own. Pierallini's work represents the significance of nature and human interaction throughout her life.

Libri in Piedi displays ten of her “artist books”: Chiome con fili (1996), Fili e foglie (1996), Sette: leggere trame (1996), Alberi nubi (1997), Luna e tronchi (1995), Giallo (1998), Ricucire gli strappi… all’infinito (1998), Vitamine…in cucina (1998), Coppia con labirinti (1999), and Fili e reti… all’infinito (2000). The books blend Pierallini's signature embroidery style with several media, including paper, pen drawings, photographs, silk, and cardboard.

Pierallini's “I Dodici Mesi” series is inspired by Les Très Riches Heures du Duc du Berry. This embroidery series depicts the twelve months with different scenes. January: The wedding feast; February: Snowfall; March: Plowing; April: The wedding; May: The trip to the country; June: The cutting of the hay; July: Harvesting and shearing; August: Off to the hunt; September: The harvest; October: Sowing; November: Gathering acorns; December: Hunting the Wild Boar.
