= Equally spaced polynomial =

An equally spaced polynomial (ESP) is a polynomial used in finite fields, specifically GF(2) (binary).

An s-ESP of degree sm can be written as:

$ESP(x) = \sum_{i=0}^{m} x^{si}$ for $i = 0, 1, \ldots, m$

or

$$ESP(x) = x^{sm} + x^{s(m-1)} + \cdots + x^s + 1.$$

== Properties ==
Over GF(2) the ESP - which then can be referred to as all one polynomial (AOP) - has many interesting properties, including:

- The Hamming weight of the ESP is m + 1.

A 1-ESP is known as an all one polynomial (AOP) and has additional properties including the above.
