= All one polynomial =

Polynomial in which all coefficients are one

In mathematics, an all one polynomial (AOP) is a polynomial in which all coefficients are one. Over the finite field of order two, conditions for the AOP to be irreducible are known, which allow this polynomial to be used to define efficient algorithms and circuits for multiplication in finite fields of characteristic two. The AOP is a 1-equally spaced polynomial.

== Definition ==
An AOP of degree m has all terms from x^{m} to x^{0} with coefficients of 1, and can be written as

$$AOP_m(x) = \sum_{i=0}^{m} x^i$$

or

$$AOP_m(x) = x^m + x^{m-1} + \cdots + x + 1$$

or

$$AOP_m(x) = {x^{m+1} - 1\over{x-1}}.$$

Thus the roots of the all one polynomial of degree m are all (m+1)th roots of unity other than unity itself.

== Properties ==
Over GF(2) the AOP has many interesting properties, including:

- The Hamming weight of the AOP is m + 1, the maximum possible for its degree
- The AOP is irreducible if and only if m + 1 is prime and 2 is a primitive root modulo m + 1 (over GF(p) with prime p, it is irreducible if and only if m + 1 is prime and p is a primitive root modulo m + 1)
- The only AOP that is a primitive polynomial is x^{2} + x + 1.

Despite the fact that the Hamming weight is large, because of the ease of representation and other improvements there are efficient implementations in areas such as coding theory and cryptography.

Over $\mathbb{Q}$, the AOP is irreducible whenever m + 1 is a prime p, and therefore in these cases, the pth cyclotomic polynomial.
