= Empire State Pullers =

Empire State Pullers, known to many of its pullers as ESP, is a truck and tractor pulling sanctioning body. It conducts pulls at circuits throughout New York State. ESP began sanctioning events in the Lucas Oil owned Pro Pulling League in 2007.

== Classes ==
At every pull, different classes of tractors pull. Each class includes a different style of tractor or truck chassis. The tractors use 6000 horsepower motors. The different classes include:

1. 2WD - Two Wheel Drive Trucks
2. MOD - Modified Tractors
3. SFS - Super Farm
4. HSS - Heavy Super Stock
5. LSS - Light Super Stock

== Champions ==
Year	Super Farm Stock	Light Super Stock	6200 WD	7500 Modified	Heavy SS
2007	Henry Everman	Jason Hootman	Ray Fintak	Sharon Everman	Dave Everman
2008	Henry Everman	Jim Meeder	Ray Fintak	Bob/ Joe Fintak	Dave Everman
