= 888 (number) =

← 887	888	889 →
- List of numbers; Integers; ← 0 100 200 300 400 500 600 700 800 900 →
- Cardinal: eight hundred eighty-eight
- Ordinal: 888th (eight hundred eighty-eighth)
- Factorization: 2^{3} × 3 × 37
- Greek numeral: ΩΠΗ´
- Roman numeral: DCCCLXXXVIII, dccclxxxviii
- Greek prefix: ὀκτακόσιοι ὀγδοήκοντα ὀκτώ oktakósioi ogdoḗkonta oktṓ
- Latin prefix: octingenti octoginta octo
- Binary: 1101111000_{2}
- Ternary: 1012220_{3}
- Senary: 4040_{6}
- Octal: 1570_{8}
- Duodecimal: 620_{12}
- Hexadecimal: 378_{16}

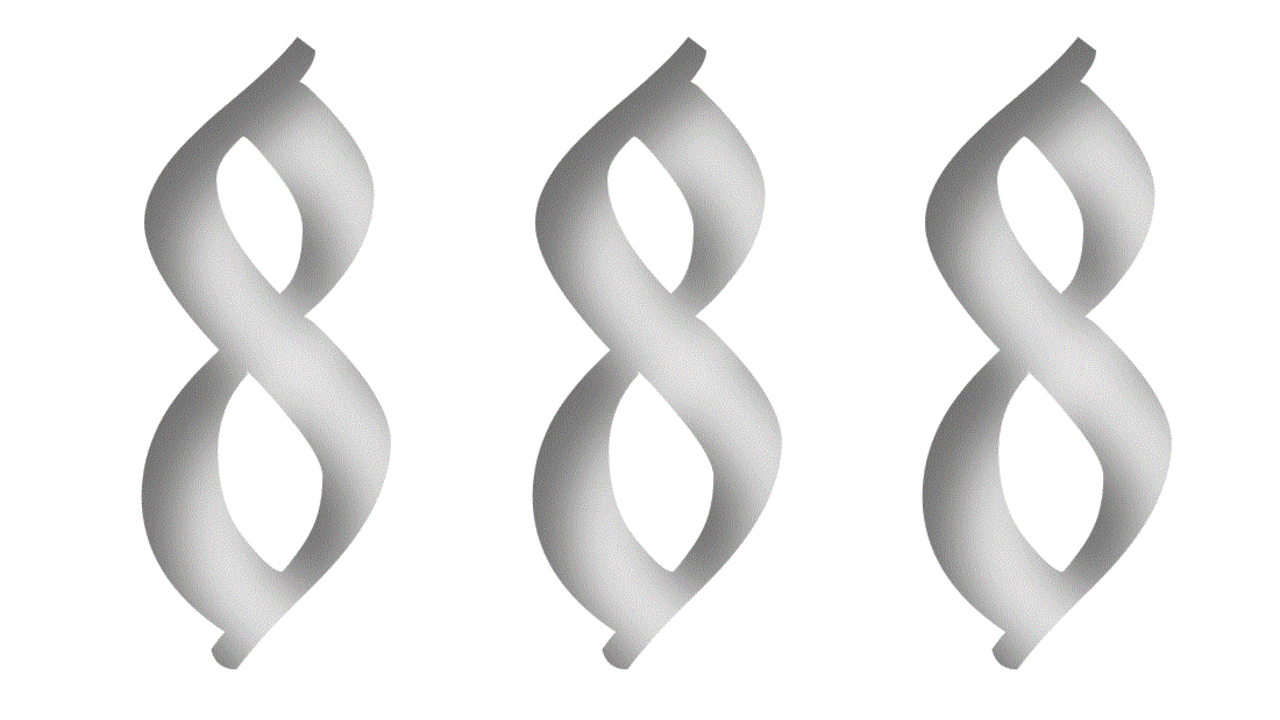
Visual representation in Cyrillic.

888 (eight hundred eighty-eight) is the natural number following 887 and preceding 889.

It is a strobogrammatic number that reads the same right-side up and upside-down on a seven-segment calculator display, symbolic in various mystical traditions.

== In mathematics ==
888 is a base ten repdigit (a number all of whose digits are equal), and

$$888 = 24 \times 37.$$

Where 37 is the 12th prime number.

888 is the sum of eight consecutive primes (97 + 101 + 103 + 107 + 109 + 113 + 127 + 131).

888!! - 1 is prime.

888 is a happy number.

888 is a practical number, meaning that every positive integer up to 888 itself may be represented as a sum of distinct divisors of 888.

888 is a Harshad number as it is divisible by its sum of digits, where 888 ÷ (8, 8, 8) is 888 ÷ 24, an equivalent fraction to 444 ÷ 12 or 222 ÷ 6, which is 37.

888 is equal to the sum of the first two Giuga numbers: 30 + 858 = 888.

There are exactly:

- 888 trees with four unlabeled and three labeled nodes,
- 888 seven-node undirected graphs without isolated vertices, and
- 888 non-alternating knots whose crossing number is 12.

=== Crystagon ===
888 is also the 16th area of a crystagon, equivalent with the quotient of binomial coefficient $\mathrm {C}(7n,2)$ and $7$ with $n = 16$.

This property permits 888 to be equivalent with:

- the sum of second pentagonal numbers and hexagonal numbers (392 + 496),
- the sum of twice pentagonal numbers and triangular numbers (752 + 136), as well as
- the difference between even squares and triangular numbers (1024 − 136).

=== Heronian tetrahedron ===
888 is the 42nd longest side of a Heronian tetrahedron, whose edge lengths, face areas and volumes are all integers; more specifically it is the second-largest longest side of a primitive Heronian tetrahedron (after 203, and preceding 1804) (Note: 203 is a number whose average of divisors is 60, the smallest number with twelve divisors and forty-second composite. On the other hand, its aliquot sum is 37, and its sum-of-divisors is 240, which is in equivalence with the number of root vectors of E_{8} in the eighth dimension. Its Euler totient is 168, which is the symmetry order of the automorphism of the Fano plane in three dimensions, and the product of the first two perfect numbers. On the other hand, 1804 is a number k such that k^{64} + 1 is prime.) with four congruent triangle faces (this primitive Heronian tetrahedron is a tetrahedron where four edges share no common factor).

=== Decimal properties ===
888 is the smallest multiple of twenty-four divisible by all of its digits, whose digit sum is also itself.

It is a happy number in decimal, meaning that repeatedly summing the squares of its digits eventually leads to 1:

$$888 \mapsto 64 + 64 + 64 = 192 \mapsto 1 + 81 + 4 = 86 \mapsto 64 + 36 = 100 \mapsto 1.$$

888^{3} = 700227072 is the smallest cube in which each digit occurs exactly three times, and the only cube in which three distinct digits each occur three times.

== Symbolism and numerology ==
The number 888 is often symbolised within the international labour movement to symbolise the 8-hour day. Workers protested for 8 hours work, 8 hours rest and 8 hours time to themselves.

In some Christian numerology, the number 888 – Eight hundred eighty-eight represents Jesus. This representation may be justified either through gematria, by counting the letter values of the Greek transliteration of Jesus's name, as an opposing value to 666, the number of the beast and/or 888. The numerological representation of Jesus with the number 888, as the sum of the numerical values of the letters of his name, was condemned by the Church father Irenaeus as convoluted and an act which reduced "the Lord of all things" to something alphabetical.

In Chinese numerology, 888 usually means triple fortune, due to 8 (pinyin: bā) sounding like the 發 (fā) of 發達 ('prosperity'), and the triplet of it is a form of strengthening the digit 8. On its own, the number 8 is often associated with great fortune, wealth and spiritual enlightenment. Hence, 888 is considered triple fortune. For this reason, addresses and phone numbers containing the digit sequence 888 are considered particularly lucky, and may command a premium because of it.

== See also ==
- 888 (disambiguation)
