= 177 (number) =

← 176	177	178 →
- ← 170 171 172 173 174 175 176 177 178 179 →: List of numbers; Integers; ← 0 100 200 300 400 500 600 700 800 900 →
- Cardinal: one hundred seventy-seven
- Ordinal: 177th (one hundred seventy-seventh)
- Factorization: 3 × 59
- Divisors: 1, 3, 59, 177
- Greek numeral: ΡΟΖ´
- Roman numeral: CLXXVII, clxxvii
- Binary: 10110001_{2}
- Ternary: 20120_{3}
- Senary: 453_{6}
- Octal: 261_{8}
- Duodecimal: 129_{12}
- Hexadecimal: B1_{16}

177 (one hundred [and] seventy-seven) is the natural number following 176 and preceding 178.

== In mathematics ==
One hundred and seventy-seven is the eighth Leyland number, where

$$177 = 2^7 + 7^2.$$

The fifty-seventh semiprime is 177 (after the square of 13), and it is the 51st semiprime with distinct prime factors. (Note: Following the fifty-sixth member 166, whose divisors hold an arithmetic mean of 63, a value equal to the aliquot part of 177. As a semiprime of the form n = p × q for which p and q are distinct prime numbers congruent to 3 mod 4, 177 is the eleventh Blum integer, where the first such integer 21 divides the aliquot part of 177 thrice over.)

The magic constant $M$ of the smallest full $3 \times 3$ magic square consisting of distinct primes is 177: (Note: The first three such magic constants of non-trivial magic squares with distinct prime numbers sum to 177 + 120 + 233 = 530 — also the sum between the first three perfect numbers, 6 + 28 + 496 — that is one less than thrice 177.)

17	89	71
113	59	5
47	29	101

Where the central cell $\text { } 59 = \tfrac {177}{3}\text { }$ represents the seventeenth prime number, and seventh super-prime; equal to the sum of all prime numbers up to 17, including one: $1 + 2 + 3 + 5 + 7 + 11 + 13 + 17 = 59.$

177 is also an arithmetic number, whose $\sigma_0$ holds an integer arithmetic mean of $60$ — it is the one hundred and nineteenth indexed member in this sequence, where $\text { }59 + 60 = 119.$ The first non-trivial 60-gonal number is 177. (Note: Where 60 is the value of the second unitary perfect number, after 6.)

177 is the tenth Leonardo number, part of a sequence of numbers closely related to the Fibonacci numbers.

In graph enumeration, there are

- 177 rooted trees with 10 nodes and height at most 3,
- 177 undirected graphs (not necessarily connected) that have 7 edges and no isolated vertices.

There are 177 ways of re-connecting the (labeled) vertices of a regular octagon into a star polygon that does not use any of the octagon edges.
