= 173 (number) =

← 172	173	174 →
- ← 170 171 172 173 174 175 176 177 178 179 →: List of numbers; Integers; ← 0 100 200 300 400 500 600 700 800 900 →
- Cardinal: one hundred seventy-three
- Ordinal: 173rd (one hundred seventy-third)
- Factorization: prime
- Prime: 40th
- Divisors: 1, 173
- Greek numeral: ΡΟΓ´
- Roman numeral: CLXXIII, clxxiii
- Binary: 10101101_{2}
- Ternary: 20102_{3}
- Senary: 445_{6}
- Octal: 255_{8}
- Duodecimal: 125_{12}
- Hexadecimal: AD_{16}

173 (one hundred [and] seventy-three) is the natural number following 172 and preceding 174.

== In mathematics ==
173 is:

- an odd number.
- a deficient number.
- an odious number.
- a balanced prime.
- an Eisenstein prime with no imaginary part.
- a Sophie Germain prime.
- a Pythagorean prime.
- a Higgs prime.
- an isolated prime.
- a regular prime.
- a sexy prime.
- a twice sexy prime (167, 173; 173, 179).
- a truncatable prime.
- an inconsummate number.
- the sum of 2 squares: 2^{2} + 13^{2}.
- the sum of three consecutive prime numbers: 53 + 59 + 61.
- Palindromic number in bases 3 (20102_{3}) and 9 (212_{9}).
- the 40th prime number following 167 and preceding 179.
