= 176 (number) =

← 175	176	177 →
- ← 170 171 172 173 174 175 176 177 178 179 →: List of numbers; Integers; ← 0 100 200 300 400 500 600 700 800 900 →
- Cardinal: one hundred seventy-six
- Ordinal: 176th (one hundred seventy-sixth)
- Factorization: 2^{4} × 11
- Divisors: 1, 2, 4, 8, 11, 16, 22, 44, 88, 176
- Greek numeral: ΡΟϚ´
- Roman numeral: CLXXVI, clxxvi
- Binary: 10110000_{2}
- Ternary: 20112_{3}
- Senary: 452_{6}
- Octal: 260_{8}
- Duodecimal: 128_{12}
- Hexadecimal: B0_{16}

176 (one hundred [and] seventy-six) is the natural number following 175 and preceding 177.

== In mathematics ==
176 is an even number and an abundant number. It is an odious number, a self number, a semiperfect number, and a practical number.

176 is a cake number, a happy number, a pentagonal number, and an octagonal number. 15 can be partitioned in 176 ways.

The Higman–Sims group can be constructed as a doubly transitive permutation group acting on a geometry containing 176 points, and it is also the symmetry group of the largest possible set of equiangular lines in 22 dimensions, which contains 176 lines.
