= 181 (number) =

← 180	181	182 →
- ← 180 181 182 183 184 185 186 187 188 189 →: List of numbers; Integers; ← 0 100 200 300 400 500 600 700 800 900 →
- Cardinal: one hundred eighty-one
- Ordinal: 181st (one hundred eighty-first)
- Factorization: prime
- Prime: 42nd
- Divisors: 1, 181
- Greek numeral: ΡΠΑ´
- Roman numeral: CLXXXI, clxxxi
- Binary: 10110101_{2}
- Ternary: 20201_{3}
- Senary: 501_{6}
- Octal: 265_{8}
- Duodecimal: 131_{12}
- Hexadecimal: B5_{16}

181 (one hundred [and] eighty-one) is the natural number following 180 and preceding 182.

== In mathematics ==
181 is prime, and a palindromic, strobogrammatic, and dihedral number in decimal. 181 is a Chen prime.

181 is a twin prime with 179, equal to the sum of five consecutive prime numbers: 29 + 31 + 37 + 41 + 43.

181 is the difference of two consecutive square numbers 91^{2} – 90^{2}, as well as the sum of two consecutive squares: 9^{2} + 10^{2}.

As a centered polygonal number, 181 is:

- a centered square number,
- a centered pentagonal number,
- a centered dodecagonal number,
- a centered 18-gonal number, and
- a centered 30-gonal number.

181 is also a centered (hexagram) star number, as in the game of Chinese checkers.

Specifically, 181 is the 42nd prime number and 16th full reptend prime in decimal, where multiples of its reciprocal $\tfrac {1}{181}$ inside a prime reciprocal magic square repeat 180 digits with a magic sum $M$ of 810; this value is one less than 811, the 141st prime number and 49th full reptend prime (or equivalently long prime) in decimal whose reciprocal repeats 810 digits. While the first full non-normal prime reciprocal magic square is based on $\tfrac {1}{19}$ with a magic constant of 81 from a $18 \times 18$ square, a normal $19 \times 19$ magic square has a magic constant $M_{19} = 19 \times 181$; the next such full, prime reciprocal magic square is based on multiples of the reciprocal of 383 (also palindromic). (Note: Where the full reptend index of 181 is 16 = 4^{2}, the such index of 811 is 49 = 7^{2}. Note, also, that 282 is 141 × 2.)

181 is an undulating number in ternary and nonary numeral systems, while in decimal it is the 28th undulating prime.
