= 175 (number) =

← 174	175	176 →
- ← 170 171 172 173 174 175 176 177 178 179 →: List of numbers; Integers; ← 0 100 200 300 400 500 600 700 800 900 →
- Cardinal: one hundred seventy-five
- Ordinal: 175th (one hundred seventy-fifth)
- Factorization: 5^{2} × 7
- Divisors: 1, 5, 7, 25, 35, 175
- Greek numeral: ΡΟΕ´
- Roman numeral: CLXXV, clxxv
- Binary: 10101111_{2}
- Ternary: 20111_{3}
- Senary: 451_{6}
- Octal: 257_{8}
- Duodecimal: 127_{12}
- Hexadecimal: AF_{16}

175 (one hundred [and] seventy-five) is the natural number following 174 and preceding 176.

== In mathematics ==
Raising the decimal digits of 175 to the powers of successive integers produces 175 back again: 175 = 1^{1} + 7^{2} + 5^{3}.

175 is a figurate number for a rhombic dodecahedron, the difference of two consecutive fourth powers: 175 = 4^{4} − 3^{4}. It is also a decagonal number and a decagonal pyramid number, the smallest number after 1 that has both properties.

== See also ==
- The year AD 175 or 175 BC
- List of highways numbered 175
