= 191 =

191 may also refer to:

- 191 (number)
- AD 191
- 191 BC
- 191 (New Jersey bus)
- Special Order 191
  - Timeline-191
- Jordan 191
- VF-191

== See also ==
- 191st (disambiguation)
- Flight 191 (disambiguation)
- List of highways numbered 191
