= 174 (number) =

| ← 173 | 174 | 175 → |
- ← 170 171 172 173 174 175 176 177 178 179 →: List of numbers; Integers; ← 0 100 200 300 400 500 600 700 800 900 →
- Cardinal: one hundred seventy-four
- Ordinal: 174th (one hundred seventy-fourth)
- Factorization: 2 × 3 × 29
- Divisors: 1, 2, 3, 6, 29, 58, 87, 174
- Greek numeral: ΡΟΔ´
- Roman numeral: CLXXIV, clxxiv
- Binary: 10101110_{2}
- Ternary: 20110_{3}
- Senary: 450_{6}
- Octal: 256_{8}
- Duodecimal: 126_{12}
- Hexadecimal: AE_{16}

174 (one hundred [and] seventy-four) is the natural number following 173 and preceding 175.

== In mathematics ==
There are 174 7-crossing semi-meanders, ways of arranging a semi-infinite curve in the plane so that it crosses a straight line seven times. There are 174 invertible $3\times 3$ (0,1)-matrices. There are also 174 combinatorially distinct ways of subdividing a topological cuboid into a mesh of tetrahedra, without adding extra vertices, although not all can be represented geometrically by flat-sided polyhedra.

The Mordell curve $y^2=x^3-174$ has rank three, and 174 is the smallest positive integer for which $y^2=x^3-k$ has this rank. The corresponding number for curves $y^2=x^3+k$ is 113.
