= 187 (number) =

← 186	187	188 →
- ← 180 181 182 183 184 185 186 187 188 189 →: List of numbers; Integers; ← 0 100 200 300 400 500 600 700 800 900 →
- Cardinal: one hundred eighty-seven
- Ordinal: 187th (one hundred eighty-seventh)
- Factorization: 11 × 17
- Divisors: 1, 11, 17, 187
- Greek numeral: ΡΠΖ´
- Roman numeral: CLXXXVII, clxxxvii
- Binary: 10111011_{2}
- Ternary: 20221_{3}
- Senary: 511_{6}
- Octal: 273_{8}
- Duodecimal: 137_{12}
- Hexadecimal: BB_{16}

187 (one hundred [and] eighty-seven) is the natural number following 186 and preceding 188.

== In mathematics ==
There are 187 ways of forming a sum of positive integers that adds to 11, counting two sums as equivalent when they are cyclic permutations of each other. There are also 187 unordered triples of 5-bit binary numbers whose bitwise exclusive or is zero.

Per Miller's rules, the triakis tetrahedron produces 187 distinct stellations. It is the smallest Catalan solid, dual to the truncated tetrahedron, which only has 9 distinct stellations.

== See also ==
- 187 (disambiguation)
