= 172 (number) =

← 171	172	173 →
- ← 170 171 172 173 174 175 176 177 178 179 →: List of numbers; Integers; ← 0 100 200 300 400 500 600 700 800 900 →
- Cardinal: one hundred seventy-two
- Ordinal: 172nd (one hundred seventy-second)
- Factorization: 2^{2} × 43
- Divisors: 1, 2, 4, 43, 86, 172
- Greek numeral: ΡΟΒ´
- Roman numeral: CLXXII, clxxii
- Binary: 10101100_{2}
- Ternary: 20101_{3}
- Senary: 444_{6}
- Octal: 254_{8}
- Duodecimal: 124_{12}
- Hexadecimal: AC_{16}

172 (one hundred [and] seventy-two) is the natural number following 171 and preceding 173.

== In mathematics ==
172 is a part of a near-miss for being a counterexample to Fermat's Last Theorem, as 135^{3} + 138^{3} = 172^{3} − 1. This is only the third near-miss of this form, two cubes adding to one less than a third cube. It is also a "thickened cube number", half an odd cube (7^{3} = 343) rounded up to the next integer.

== See also ==
- 172
