= 184 (number) =

← 183	184	185 →
- ← 180 181 182 183 184 185 186 187 188 189 →: List of numbers; Integers; ← 0 100 200 300 400 500 600 700 800 900 →
- Cardinal: one hundred eighty-four
- Ordinal: 184th (one hundred eighty-fourth)
- Factorization: 2^{3} × 23
- Divisors: 1, 2, 4, 8, 23, 46, 92, 184
- Greek numeral: ΡΠΔ´
- Roman numeral: CLXXXIV, clxxxiv
- Binary: 10111000_{2}
- Ternary: 20211_{3}
- Senary: 504_{6}
- Octal: 270_{8}
- Duodecimal: 134_{12}
- Hexadecimal: B8_{16}

184 (one hundred [and] eighty-four) is the natural number following 183 and preceding 185.

== In mathematics ==
There are 184 different Eulerian graphs on eight unlabeled vertices, and 184 paths by which a chess rook can travel from one corner of a 4 × 4 chessboard to the opposite corner without passing through the same square twice. 184 is also a refactorable number.

== In other fields ==
Some physicists have proposed that 184 is a magic number for neutrons in atomic nuclei.
