= 188 (number) =

← 187	188	189 →
- ← 180 181 182 183 184 185 186 187 188 189 →: List of numbers; Integers; ← 0 100 200 300 400 500 600 700 800 900 →
- Cardinal: one hundred eighty-eight
- Ordinal: 188th (one hundred eighty-eighth)
- Factorization: 2^{2} × 47
- Divisors: 1, 2, 4, 47, 94, 188
- Greek numeral: ΡΠΗ´
- Roman numeral: CLXXXVIII, clxxxviii
- Binary: 10111100_{2}
- Ternary: 20222_{3}
- Senary: 512_{6}
- Octal: 274_{8}
- Duodecimal: 138_{12}
- Hexadecimal: BC_{16}

188 (one hundred [and] eighty-eight) is the natural number following 187 and preceding 189.

== In mathematics ==
There are 188 different four-element semigroups, and 188 ways a chess queen can move from one corner of a $4\times 4$ board to the opposite corner by a path that always moves closer to its goal. The sides and diagonals of a regular dodecagon form 188 equilateral triangles.

== In other fields ==
The number 188 figures prominently in the film The Parallel Street (1962) by German experimental film director Ferdinand Khittl. The opening frame of the film is just an image of this number.
