= 198 (number) =

← 197	198	199 →
- ← 190 191 192 193 194 195 196 197 198 199 →: List of numbers; Integers; ← 0 100 200 300 400 500 600 700 800 900 →
- Cardinal: one hundred ninety-eight
- Ordinal: 198th (one hundred ninety-eighth)
- Factorization: 2 × 3^{2} × 11
- Divisors: 1, 2, 3, 6, 9, 11, 18, 22, 33, 66, 99, 198
- Greek numeral: ΡϞΗ´
- Roman numeral: CXCVIII, cxcviii
- Binary: 11000110_{2}
- Ternary: 21100_{3}
- Senary: 530_{6}
- Octal: 306_{8}
- Duodecimal: 146_{12}
- Hexadecimal: C6_{16}

198 (one hundred [and] ninety-eight) is the natural number following 197 and preceding 199.

== In mathematics ==
- 198 is the smallest number that can be written as a sum of four positive squares in ten different ways.
- There are 198 positive palindromic numbers under 10,000.
- 198 is a Harshad number since the sum of the digits is 18, and $198 / 18 = 11$ which the sum is a whole number.
- 198 is a Pell–Lucas number. Its corresponding Pell number is 70.
- 198 is a practical number, and a 5-tuple of practical numbers.
- 198 is the only number such that it equals the sum of its digits times 1.1.

== In other fields ==
- 198 is the number of ridges on a U.S. dollar coin.
