= 182 (number) =

← 181	182	183 →
- ← 180 181 182 183 184 185 186 187 188 189 →: List of numbers; Integers; ← 0 100 200 300 400 500 600 700 800 900 →
- Cardinal: one hundred eighty-two
- Ordinal: 182nd (one hundred eighty-second)
- Factorization: 2 × 7 × 13
- Divisors: 1, 2, 7, 13, 14, 26, 91, 182
- Greek numeral: ΡΠΒ´
- Roman numeral: CLXXXII, clxxxii
- Binary: 10110110_{2}
- Ternary: 20202_{3}
- Senary: 502_{6}
- Octal: 266_{8}
- Duodecimal: 132_{12}
- Hexadecimal: B6_{16}
- Hebrew: קפב (Kuf Peh Bet)
- Ge'ez numeral: ፻፹፪
- Chinese numeral: 百八十二
- Fibonacci: 001000010011

182 (one hundred [and] eighty-two) is the natural number following 181 and preceding 183.

== In mathematics ==
- 182 is an even number
- 182 is a composite number, as it is a positive integer with a positive divisor other than one or itself
- 182 is a deficient number, as the sum of its proper divisors, 154, is less than 182
- 182 is a member of the Mian–Chowla sequence: 1, 2, 4, 8, 13, 21, 31, 45, 66, 81, 97, 123, 148, 182
- 182 is a nontotient number, as there is no integer with exactly 182 coprimes below it
- 182 is an odious number
- 182 is a pronic number, oblong number or heteromecic number, a number which is the product of two consecutive integers (13 × 14)
- 182 is a repdigit in base 25 (77) and in base 9 (222)
- 182 is a sphenic number, the product of three prime factors
- 182 is a square-free number
- 182 is an Ulam number
