= 185 (number) =

← 184	185	186 →
- ← 180 181 182 183 184 185 186 187 188 189 →: List of numbers; Integers; ← 0 100 200 300 400 500 600 700 800 900 →
- Cardinal: one hundred eighty-five
- Ordinal: 185th (one hundred eighty-fifth)
- Factorization: 5 × 37
- Divisors: 1, 5, 37, 185
- Greek numeral: ΡΠΕ´
- Roman numeral: CLXXXV, clxxxv
- Binary: 10111001_{2}
- Ternary: 20212_{3}
- Senary: 505_{6}
- Octal: 271_{8}
- Duodecimal: 135_{12}
- Hexadecimal: B9_{16}

185 (one hundred [and] eighty-five) is the natural number following 184 and preceding 186.

== In mathematics ==
There are 185 different directed graphs on four unlabeled vertices that have at least one sink vertex, with no outgoing edges, 185 ways of permuting the squares of a $2\times 4$ grid of squares in such a way that each square is one unit away from its original position horizontally, vertically, or diagonally, and 185 matroids on five labeled elements in which each element participates in at least one basis.

The Spiral of Theodorus

The Spiral of Theodorus is formed by unit-length line segments that, together with the center point of the spiral, form right triangles. 185 of these right triangles fit within the first four turns of this spiral.

185 is the smallest base b without algebraic factorisation of generalized repunits for which no generalized repunit primes are known. It is known that the generalized repunit number $\frac{185^p-1}{184}$ is composite for all prime p < 350,000.
