= 183 (number) =

← 182	183	184 →
- ← 180 181 182 183 184 185 186 187 188 189 →: List of numbers; Integers; ← 0 100 200 300 400 500 600 700 800 900 →
- Cardinal: one hundred eighty-three
- Ordinal: 183rd (one hundred eighty-third)
- Factorization: 3 × 61
- Divisors: 1, 3, 61, 183
- Greek numeral: ΡΠΓ´
- Roman numeral: CLXXXIII, clxxxiii
- Binary: 10110111_{2}
- Ternary: 20210_{3}
- Senary: 503_{6}
- Octal: 267_{8}
- Duodecimal: 133_{12}
- Hexadecimal: B7_{16}

183 (one hundred [and] eighty-three) is the natural number following 182 and preceding 184.

== In mathematics ==
183 is a perfect totient number, a number that is equal to the sum of its iterated totients.

Because $183 = 13^2 + 13 + 1$, it is the number of points in a projective plane over the finite field $\mathbb{Z}_{13}$. It is a repdigit in tredecimal (111_{13}). 183 is the fourth element of a divisibility sequence $1,3,13,183,\dots$ in which the $n$th number $a_n$ can be computed as $a_n=a_{n-1}^2+a_{n-1}+1=\bigl\lfloor x^{2^n}\bigr\rfloor,$ for a transcendental number $x\approx 1.38509$. This sequence counts the number of trees of height $\le n$ in which each node can have at most two children.

There are 183 different semiorders on four labeled elements.
