= 178 (number) =

← 177	178	179 →
- ← 170 171 172 173 174 175 176 177 178 179 →: List of numbers; Integers; ← 0 100 200 300 400 500 600 700 800 900 →
- Cardinal: one hundred seventy-eight
- Ordinal: 178th (one hundred seventy-eighth)
- Factorization: 2 × 89
- Divisors: 1, 2, 89, 178
- Greek numeral: ΡΟΗ´
- Roman numeral: CLXXVIII, clxxviii
- Binary: 10110010_{2}
- Ternary: 20121_{3}
- Senary: 454_{6}
- Octal: 262_{8}
- Duodecimal: 12A_{12}
- Hexadecimal: B2_{16}

178 (one hundred [and] seventy-eight) is the natural number following 177 and preceding 179.

== In mathematics ==
There are 178 biconnected graphs with six vertices, among which one is designated as the root and the rest are unlabeled. There are also 178 median graphs on nine vertices.

178 is one of the indexes of the smallest triple of dodecahedral numbers where one is the sum of the other two: the sum of the 46th and the 178th dodecahedral numbers is the 179th.
