= 186 (number) =

← 185	186	187 →
- ← 180 181 182 183 184 185 186 187 188 189 →: List of numbers; Integers; ← 0 100 200 300 400 500 600 700 800 900 →
- Cardinal: one hundred eighty-six
- Ordinal: 186th (one hundred eighty-sixth)
- Factorization: 2 × 3 × 31
- Divisors: 1, 2, 3, 6, 31, 62, 93, 186
- Greek numeral: ΡΠϚ´
- Roman numeral: CLXXXVI, clxxxvi
- Binary: 10111010_{2}
- Ternary: 20220_{3}
- Senary: 510_{6}
- Octal: 272_{8}
- Duodecimal: 136_{12}
- Hexadecimal: BA_{16}

186 (one hundred [and] eighty-six) is the natural number following 185 and preceding 187.

== In mathematics ==
There is no integer with exactly 186 coprimes less than it, so 186 is a nontotient. It is also never the difference between an integer and the total of coprimes below it, so it is a noncototient.

There are 186 different pentahexes, shapes formed by gluing together five regular hexagons, when rotations of shapes are counted as distinct from each other.

186 is a Fine number.
