= 196 (number) =

← 195	196	197 →
- ← 190 191 192 193 194 195 196 197 198 199 →: List of numbers; Integers; ← 0 100 200 300 400 500 600 700 800 900 →
- Cardinal: one hundred ninety-six
- Ordinal: 196th (one hundred ninety-sixth)
- Factorization: 2^{2} × 7^{2}
- Divisors: 1, 2, 4, 7, 14, 28, 49, 98, 196
- Greek numeral: ΡϞϚ´
- Roman numeral: CXCVI, cxcvi
- Binary: 11000100_{2}
- Ternary: 21021_{3}
- Senary: 524_{6}
- Octal: 304_{8}
- Duodecimal: 144_{12}
- Hexadecimal: C4_{16}

196 (one hundred [and] ninety-six) is the natural number following 195 and preceding 197.

== In mathematics ==
196 is a square number, the square of 14. As the square of a Catalan number, it counts the number of walks of length 8 in the positive quadrant of the integer grid that start and end at the origin, moving diagonally at each step. It is part of a sequence of square numbers beginning 0, 1, 4, 25, 196, ... in which each number is the smallest square that differs from the previous number by a triangular number.

There are 196 one-sided heptominoes, the polyominoes made from 7 squares. Here, one-sided means that asymmetric polyominoes are considered to be distinct from their mirror images.

A Lychrel number is a natural number which cannot form a palindromic number through the iterative process of repeatedly reversing its digits and adding the resulting numbers. 196 is the smallest number conjectured to be a Lychrel number in base 10; the process has been carried out for over a billion iterations without finding a palindrome, but no one has ever proven that it will never produce one.

== See also ==
- 196
