= 197 (number) =

← 196	197	198 →
- ← 190 191 192 193 194 195 196 197 198 199 →: List of numbers; Integers; ← 0 100 200 300 400 500 600 700 800 900 →
- Cardinal: one hundred ninety-seven
- Ordinal: 197th (one hundred ninety-seventh)
- Factorization: prime
- Prime: 45th
- Greek numeral: ΡϞΖ´
- Roman numeral: CXCVII, cxcvii
- Binary: 11000101_{2}
- Ternary: 21022_{3}
- Senary: 525_{6}
- Octal: 305_{8}
- Duodecimal: 145_{12}
- Hexadecimal: C5_{16}

197 (one hundred [and] ninety-seven) is the natural number following 196 and preceding 198.

== In mathematics ==
- 197 is a prime number, the third of a prime quadruplet: 191, 193, 197, 199
- 197 is the smallest prime number that is the sum of seven consecutive primes: 17 + 19 + 23 + 29 + 31 + 37 + 41, and is the sum of the first twelve prime numbers: 2 + 3 + 5 + 7 + 11 + 13 + 17 + 19 + 23 + 29 + 31 + 37
- 197 is a centered heptagonal number, a centered figurate number that represents a heptagon with a dot in the center and all other dots surrounding the center dot in successive heptagonal layers
- 197 is a Schröder–Hipparchus number, counting for instance the number of ways of subdividing a heptagon by a non-crossing set of its diagonals.
