= 193 =

193 may refer to:

- 193 (number)
- AD 193
- 193 BC
- 193 (MBTA bus)
- 193 (New Jersey bus)
- 193 Ambrosia
- Connecticut Route 193
- Maryland Route 193
- West Virginia Route 193
- Alabama State Route 193
- California State Route 193
- Ohio State Route 193
- Georgia State Route 193
- Maine State Route 193
- New York State Route 193
- Tennessee State Route 193
- Utah State Route 193
- Virginia State Route 193
- Washington State Route 193
- Japan National Route 193
- Arkansas Highway 193
- Wisconsin Highway 193
- Wyoming Highway 193
- Mexican Federal Highway 193
- Texas State Highway 193
- Jordan 193
- Eyebrow No. 193, Saskatchewan
- Lectionary 193
- Radical 193
- Minuscule 193
- Trial of the 193
- DFS 193
- JWH-193
- SP-193
- USA-193
- ICRF 193
- P.S. 193
- National Airlines Flight 193
- German submarine U-193
- 193rd (2nd Argyll & Sutherland Highlanders) Brigade
- 193rd Battalion (Nova Scotia Highlanders), CEF
- 193rd Ohio Infantry
- 193rd Infantry Brigade (United States)
- 193d Special Operations Squadron
- 193d Special Operations Wing

== See also ==
- 193rd (disambiguation)
