= 191st Regiment =

191st Regiment may refer to:

- 191st Ohio Infantry Regiment, Union Army
- 191st Pennsylvania Infantry Regiment, Union Army
- 191st (Hertfordshire and Essex Yeomanry) Field Regiment, Royal Artillery
- 191st Mechanized Regiment, Greece

== See also ==
- 191st (disambiguation)
