= 162 (number) =

← 161	162	163 →
- ← 160 161 162 163 164 165 166 167 168 169 →: List of numbers; Integers; ← 0 100 200 300 400 500 600 700 800 900 →
- Cardinal: one hundred sixty-two
- Ordinal: 162nd (one hundred sixty-second)
- Factorization: 2 × 3^{4}
- Divisors: 1, 2, 3, 6, 9, 18, 27, 54, 81, 162
- Greek numeral: ΡΞΒ´
- Roman numeral: CLXII, clxii
- Binary: 10100010_{2}
- Ternary: 20000_{3}
- Senary: 430_{6}
- Octal: 242_{8}
- Duodecimal: 116_{12}
- Hexadecimal: A2_{16}

162 (one hundred [and] sixty-two) is the natural number following 161 and preceding 163.

== In mathematics ==
Having only 2 and 3 as its prime divisors, 162 is a 3-smooth number. 162 is also an abundant number, since its sum of divisors $1+2+3+6+9+18+27+54+81 = 201$ is greater than it. As the product $3\times 6\times 9=162$ of numbers three units apart from each other, it is a triple factorial number.

There are 162 ways of partitioning seven items into subsets of at least two items per subset. 162^{64} + 1 is a prime number.
