= 160 (number) =

← 159	160	161 →
- ← 160 161 162 163 164 165 166 167 168 169 →: List of numbers; Integers; ← 0 100 200 300 400 500 600 700 800 900 →
- Cardinal: one hundred sixty
- Ordinal: 160th (one hundred sixtieth)
- Factorization: 2^{5} × 5
- Divisors: 1, 2, 4, 5, 8, 10, 16, 20, 32, 40, 80, 160
- Greek numeral: ΡΞ´
- Roman numeral: CLX, clx
- Binary: 10100000_{2}
- Ternary: 12221_{3}
- Senary: 424_{6}
- Octal: 240_{8}
- Duodecimal: 114_{12}
- Hexadecimal: A0_{16}

160 (one hundred [and] sixty) is the natural number following 159 and preceding 161.

== In mathematics ==
160 is the sum of the first 11 primes, as well as the sum of the cubes of the first three primes.

Given 160, the Mertens function returns 0. 160 is the smallest number n with exactly 12 solutions to the equation φ(x) = n. It is also palindromic in base 3 (12221), and in base 6 (424).

== In telecommunications ==
- 160 is the number of characters permitted in a standard short message service.
