= 165 (number) =

| ← 164 | 165 | 166 → |
- ← 160 161 162 163 164 165 166 167 168 169 →: List of numbers; Integers; ← 0 100 200 300 400 500 600 700 800 900 →
- Cardinal: one hundred sixty-five
- Ordinal: 165th (one hundred sixty-fifth)
- Factorization: 3 × 5 × 11
- Divisors: 1, 3, 5, 11, 15, 33, 55, 165
- Greek numeral: ΡΞΕ´
- Roman numeral: CLXV, clxv
- Binary: 10100101_{2}
- Ternary: 20010_{3}
- Senary: 433_{6}
- Octal: 245_{8}
- Duodecimal: 119_{12}
- Hexadecimal: A5_{16}

165 (one hundred [and] sixty-five) is the natural number following 164 and preceding 166.

== In mathematics ==
165 is:

- an odd number, a composite number, and a deficient number.
- a sphenic number.
- a tetrahedral number.
- the number of prime knots with 10 crossings.
- the sum of the sums of the divisors of the first 14 positive integers.
- a self number in base 10.
- a palindromic number in binary (10100101_{2}) and bases 14 (BB_{14}), 32 (55_{32}) and 54 (33_{54}).
- a unique period in base 2.
- the number of Wikipedias (including closed and deleted ones).
