= 195 (number) =

← 194	195	196 →
- ← 190 191 192 193 194 195 196 197 198 199 →: List of numbers; Integers; ← 0 100 200 300 400 500 600 700 800 900 →
- Cardinal: one hundred ninety-five
- Ordinal: 195th (one hundred ninety-fifth)
- Factorization: 3 × 5 × 13
- Divisors: 1, 3, 5, 13, 15, 39, 65, 195
- Greek numeral: ΡϞΕ´
- Roman numeral: CXCV, cxcv
- Binary: 11000011_{2}
- Ternary: 21020_{3}
- Senary: 523_{6}
- Octal: 303_{8}
- Duodecimal: 143_{12}
- Hexadecimal: C3_{16}

195 (one hundred [and] ninety-five) is the natural number following 194 and preceding 196.

== In mathematics ==
195 is:

- the sum of eleven consecutive primes: 3 + 5 + 7 + 11 + 13 + 17 + 19 + 23 + 29 + 31 + 37
- the smallest number expressed as a sum of distinct squares in 16 different ways (sequence A097563 in the OEIS)
- a centered tetrahedral number
- in the middle of a prime quadruplet (191, 193, 197, 199).

== See also ==
- 195 (disambiguation)
- 195 (year)
