= Dihedral =

Dihedral or polyhedral may refer to:

- Dihedral angle, the angle between two mathematical planes
- Dihedral (aeronautics), the upward angle of a fixed-wing aircraft's wings where they meet at the fuselage, dihedral effect of an aircraft, longitudinal dihedral angle of a fixed-wing aircraft
- Dihedral group, the group of symmetries of the n-sided polygon in abstract algebra
  - Also Dihedral symmetry in three dimensions
- Dihedral kite, also known as a bowed kite
- Dihedral doors, also known as butterfly doors
- Dihedral prime, also known as a dihedral calculator prime
- In rock climbing, an inside corner of rock

== See also ==
- Anhedral (disambiguation)
- Euhedral, a crystal structure
- Polyhedron, a geometric shape
