= 163 (number) =

← 162	163	164 →
- ← 160 161 162 163 164 165 166 167 168 169 →: List of numbers; Integers; ← 0 100 200 300 400 500 600 700 800 900 →
- Cardinal: one hundred sixty-three
- Ordinal: 163rd (one hundred sixty-third)
- Factorization: prime
- Prime: 38th
- Divisors: 1, 163
- Greek numeral: ΡΞΓ´
- Roman numeral: CLXIII, clxiii
- Binary: 10100011_{2}
- Ternary: 20001_{3}
- Senary: 431_{6}
- Octal: 243_{8}
- Duodecimal: 117_{12}
- Hexadecimal: A3_{16}

163 (one hundred [and] sixty-three) is the natural number following 162 and preceding 164.

== In mathematics ==
163 is the 38th prime number and a strong prime in the sense that it is greater than the arithmetic mean of its two neighboring primes.

163 is a lucky prime and a fortunate number.

163 is a strictly non-palindromic number, since it is not palindromic in any base between base 2 and base 161.

Given 163, the Mertens function returns 0. It is the fourth prime with this property. The first three such primes are 2, 101 and 149.

As approximations, $\pi \approx {2^9 \over 163} \approx 3.1411...$, and $e \approx {163 \over 3\cdot4\cdot5} \approx 2.7166\dots$

163 is a permutable prime in base 12, which it is written as 117, the permutations of its digits are 171 and 711, the two numbers in base 12 are 229 and 1021 in base 10, both of which are prime.

The function $f(n) = n^2 - n + 41$ gives prime values for all values of $n$ between 0 and 39, while for $n < 3000$ approximately half of all values are prime. 163 appears as a result of solving $f(n)=0$, which gives $n = (-1+ \sqrt{-163} ) / 2$.

163 is a Heegner number, the largest of the nine such numbers. That is, the ring of integers of the field $\mathbb{Q}(\sqrt{-a})$ has unique factorization for $a=163$. The only other such integers are $a = 1, 2, 3, 7, 11, 19, 43, 67$. (sequence A003173 in the OEIS)

163 is the number of linearly Z-independent McKay-Thompson series for the monster group, which also represent their collective maximum dimensional representation. This fact about 163 might be a clue for understanding monstrous moonshine.

$\sqrt{163}$ appears in the Ramanujan constant, since −163 is a quadratic nonresidue to modulo all the primes 3, 5, 7, ..., 37. (By quadratic reciprocity, this is equivalent to saying that all the primes 2, 3, 5, 7, ..., 37 are quadratic nonresidues modulo 163). In which $e^{\pi \sqrt{163}}$ almost equals the integer 262537412640768744 = 640320^{3} + 744. Martin Gardner famously asserted that this identity was exact in a 1975 April Fools' hoax in Scientific American; in fact the value is 262537412640768743.99999999999925007259...

It also satisfies $\frac{163}{\ln(163)}=31.999998738490...$.

== In other fields ==
163 is also:

- The number of days following the first day of Passover (Pesach), used to calculate the date of Rosh Hashanah, the Jewish New Year.

== See also ==
- 163
