= 208 (number) =

← 207	208	209 →
- ← 200 201 202 203 204 205 206 207 208 209 →: List of numbers; Integers; ← 0 100 200 300 400 500 600 700 800 900 →
- Cardinal: two hundred eight
- Ordinal: 208th (two hundred eighth)
- Factorization: 2^{4} × 13
- Divisors: 1, 2, 4, 8, 13, 16, 26, 52, 104, 208
- Greek numeral: ΣΗ´
- Roman numeral: CCVIII, ccviii
- Binary: 11010000_{2}
- Ternary: 21201_{3}
- Senary: 544_{6}
- Octal: 320_{8}
- Duodecimal: 154_{12}
- Hexadecimal: D0_{16}

208 (two hundred [and] eight) is the natural number following 207 and preceding 209.

== In mathematics ==
208 is a practical number, a tetranacci number, a rhombic matchstick number, a happy number, and a member of Aronson's sequence. There are exactly 208 five-bead necklaces drawn from a set of beads with four colors, and 208 generalized weak orders on three labeled points.
