= 192 (number) =

← 191	192	193 →
- ← 190 191 192 193 194 195 196 197 198 199 →: List of numbers; Integers; ← 0 100 200 300 400 500 600 700 800 900 →
- Cardinal: one hundred ninety-two
- Ordinal: 192nd (one hundred ninety-second)
- Factorization: 2^{6} × 3
- Divisors: 1, 2, 3, 4, 6, 8, 12, 16, 24, 32, 48, 64, 96, 192
- Greek numeral: ΡϞΒ´
- Roman numeral: CXCII, cxcii
- Binary: 11000000_{2}
- Ternary: 21010_{3}
- Senary: 520_{6}
- Octal: 300_{8}
- Duodecimal: 140_{12}
- Hexadecimal: C0_{16}

192 (one hundred [and] ninety-two) is the natural number following 191 and preceding 193.

== In mathematics ==
192 has the prime factorization $2^6\times 3$. Because it has so many small prime factors, it is the smallest number with exactly 14 divisors, namely 1, 2, 3, 4, 6, 8, 12, 16, 24, 32, 48, 64, 96 and 192. Because its only prime factors are 2 and 3, it is a 3-smooth number.

192 is a Leyland number of the second kind using 2 & 8 ($2^8-8^2$).

== See also ==
- 192
