= 194 (number) =

← 193	194	195 →
- ← 190 191 192 193 194 195 196 197 198 199 →: List of numbers; Integers; ← 0 100 200 300 400 500 600 700 800 900 →
- Cardinal: one hundred ninety-four
- Ordinal: 194th (one hundred ninety-fourth)
- Factorization: 2 × 97
- Divisors: 1, 2, 97, 194
- Greek numeral: ΡϞΔ´
- Roman numeral: CXCIV, cxciv
- Binary: 11000010_{2}
- Ternary: 21012_{3}
- Senary: 522_{6}
- Octal: 302_{8}
- Duodecimal: 142_{12}
- Hexadecimal: C2_{16}

194 (one hundred [and] ninety-four) is the natural number following 193 and preceding 195.

== In mathematics ==
- 194 is the smallest Markov number that is neither a Fibonacci number nor a Pell number.
- 194 is the smallest number written as the sum of three squares in five ways.
- 194 is the number of irreducible representations of the Monster group.
- 194!! - 1 is prime.

== See also ==
- 194
