= 171 (number) =

← 170	171	172 →
- ← 170 171 172 173 174 175 176 177 178 179 →: List of numbers; Integers; ← 0 100 200 300 400 500 600 700 800 900 →
- Cardinal: one hundred seventy-one
- Ordinal: 171st (one hundred seventy-first)
- Factorization: 3^{2} × 19
- Divisors: 1, 3, 9, 19, 57, 171
- Greek numeral: ΡΟΑ´
- Roman numeral: CLXXI, clxxi
- Binary: 10101011_{2}
- Ternary: 20100_{3}
- Senary: 443_{6}
- Octal: 253_{8}
- Duodecimal: 123_{12}
- Hexadecimal: AB_{16}

171 (one hundred [and] seventy-one) is the natural number following 170 and preceding 172.

== In mathematics ==
171 is the 18th triangular number and a Jacobsthal number.

There are 171 transitive relations on three labeled elements, and 171 combinatorially distinct ways of subdividing a cuboid by flat cuts into a mesh of tetrahedra, without adding extra vertices.

The diagonals of a regular decagon meet at 171 points, including both crossings and the vertices of the decagon.

There are 171 faces and edges in the 57-cell, an abstract 4-polytope with hemi-dodecahedral cells that is its own dual polytope.

Within moonshine theory of sporadic groups, the friendly giant $\mathbb {M}$ is defined as having cyclic groups ⟨ $m$ ⟩ that are linked with the function,

$f_{m}(\tau) = q^{-1} + a_{1}q + a_{2}q^{2} + ..., \text{ } a_{k}$ ∈ $\mathbb{Z}, \text{ } q = e^{2\pi i \tau}, \text{ } \tau>0;$ where $q$ is the character of $\mathbb {M}$ at $m$.

This generates 171 moonshine groups within $\mathbb {M}$ associated with $f_{m}$ that are principal moduli for different genus zero congruence groups commensurable with the projective linear group $\operatorname{PSL_2}(\mathbb{Z})$.
