= Flight 209 =

Flight 209 is an airline flight number that had two accidents and incidents. It may refer to:

- Afriqiyah Airways Flight 209 - An aircraft hijacking involving an Airbus A320-214, registered as 5A-ONB. All 118, including the 2 hijackers survived without injury.
- Thai Flying Service Flight 209 - An aircraft accident involving a Cessna 208B Grand Caravan, registered as HS-SKR, killing all nine occupants on board.

== See also ==
- Flight 191
- Flight 45
