= 164 (number) =

← 163	164	165 →
- ← 160 161 162 163 164 165 166 167 168 169 →: List of numbers; Integers; ← 0 100 200 300 400 500 600 700 800 900 →
- Cardinal: one hundred sixty-four
- Ordinal: 164th (one hundred sixty-fourth)
- Factorization: 2^{2} × 41
- Divisors: 1, 2, 4, 41, 82, 164
- Greek numeral: ΡΞΔ´
- Roman numeral: CLXIV, clxiv
- Binary: 10100100_{2}
- Ternary: 20002_{3}
- Senary: 432_{6}
- Octal: 244_{8}
- Duodecimal: 118_{12}
- Hexadecimal: A4_{16}

164 (one hundred [and] sixty-four) is the natural number following 163 and preceding 165.

== In mathematics ==
164 is a zero of the Mertens function.

In base 10, 164 is the smallest number that can be expressed as a concatenation of two squares in two different ways: as 1 concatenate 64 or 16 concatenate 4.
