= 166 (number) =

← 165	166	167 →
- ← 160 161 162 163 164 165 166 167 168 169 →: List of numbers; Integers; ← 0 100 200 300 400 500 600 700 800 900 →
- Cardinal: one hundred sixty-six
- Ordinal: 166th (one hundred sixty-sixth)
- Factorization: 2 × 83
- Divisors: 1, 2, 83, 166
- Greek numeral: ΡΞϚ´
- Roman numeral: CLXVI, clxvi
- Binary: 10100110_{2}
- Ternary: 20011_{3}
- Senary: 434_{6}
- Octal: 246_{8}
- Duodecimal: 11A_{12}
- Hexadecimal: A6_{16}

166 (one hundred [and] sixty-six) is the natural number following 165 and preceding 167.

== In mathematics ==
166 is an even number and a composite number. It is a centered triangular number.

Given 166, the Mertens function returns 0. 166 is a Smith number in base 10.

166 in Roman numerals consists of the first 5 symbols, CLXVI.
