= 161 (number) =

← 160	161	162 →
- ← 160 161 162 163 164 165 166 167 168 169 →: List of numbers; Integers; ← 0 100 200 300 400 500 600 700 800 900 →
- Cardinal: one hundred sixty-one
- Ordinal: 161st (one hundred sixty-first)
- Factorization: 7 × 23
- Divisors: 1, 7, 23, 161
- Greek numeral: ΡΞΑ´
- Roman numeral: CLXI, clxi
- Binary: 10100001_{2}
- Ternary: 12222_{3}
- Senary: 425_{6}
- Octal: 241_{8}
- Duodecimal: 115_{12}
- Hexadecimal: A1_{16}

161 (one hundred [and] sixty-one) is the natural number following 160 and preceding 162.

== In mathematics ==
- 161 is the sum of five consecutive prime numbers: 23, 29, 31, 37, and 41.
- 161 is a hexagonal pyramidal number.
- 161 is a semiprime. Since its prime factors 7 and 23 are both Gaussian primes, 161 is a Blum integer.
- 161 is a palindromic number.
- 161/72 is a commonly used rational approximation of the square root of 5 and is the closest fraction with denominator <300 to that number.

== In other fields ==
- 161 as a code for Anti-Fascist Action (A=1, F=6, by order of the alphabet), sometimes used in 161>88 (88 being code for Heil Hitler among neo-nazis, as H=8)
