= 193 (number) =

← 192	193	194 →
- ← 190 191 192 193 194 195 196 197 198 199 →: List of numbers; Integers; ← 0 100 200 300 400 500 600 700 800 900 →
- Cardinal: one hundred ninety-three
- Ordinal: 193rd (one hundred ninety-third)
- Factorization: prime
- Prime: 44th
- Divisors: 1, 193
- Greek numeral: ΡϞΓ´
- Roman numeral: CXCIII, cxciii
- Binary: 11000001_{2}
- Ternary: 21011_{3}
- Senary: 521_{6}
- Octal: 301_{8}
- Duodecimal: 141_{12}
- Hexadecimal: C1_{16}

193 (one hundred [and] ninety-three) is the natural number following 192 and preceding 194.

== In mathematics ==
193 is the number of compositions of 14 into distinct parts. In decimal, it is the seventeenth full repetend prime, or long prime.

- It is the only odd prime $p$ known for which 2 is not a primitive root of $4p^2 + 1$.
- It is the thirteenth Pierpont prime, which implies that a regular 193-gon can be constructed using a compass, straightedge, and angle trisector.
- It is part of the fourteenth pair of twin primes $(191, 193)$, the seventh trio of prime triplets $(193, 197, 199)$, and the fourth set of prime quadruplets $(191, 193, 197, 199)$.

Aside from itself, the friendly giant (the largest sporadic group) holds a total of 193 conjugacy classes. It also holds at least 44 maximal subgroups aside from the double cover of $\mathbb {B}$ (the forty-fourth prime number is 193).

193 is also the eighth numerator of convergents to Euler's number; correct to three decimal places: $e \approx \tfrac{193}{71} \approx 2.718\;{\color{red}309\;859\;\ldots}$ The denominator is 71, which is the largest supersingular prime that uniquely divides the order of the friendly giant.

== In politics ==
193 is also the current amount of member states that in the United Nations.

== See also ==
- 193
