= 204 (number) =

← 203	204	205 →
- ← 200 201 202 203 204 205 206 207 208 209 →: List of numbers; Integers; ← 0 100 200 300 400 500 600 700 800 900 →
- Cardinal: two hundred four
- Ordinal: 204th (two hundred fourth)
- Factorization: 2^{2} × 3 × 17
- Divisors: 1, 2, 3, 4, 6, 12, 17, 34, 51, 68, 102, 204
- Greek numeral: ΣΔ´
- Roman numeral: CCIV, cciv
- Binary: 11001100_{2}
- Ternary: 21120_{3}
- Senary: 540_{6}
- Octal: 314_{8}
- Duodecimal: 150_{12}
- Hexadecimal: CC_{16}

204 (two hundred [and] four) is the natural number following 203 and preceding 205.

== In mathematics ==
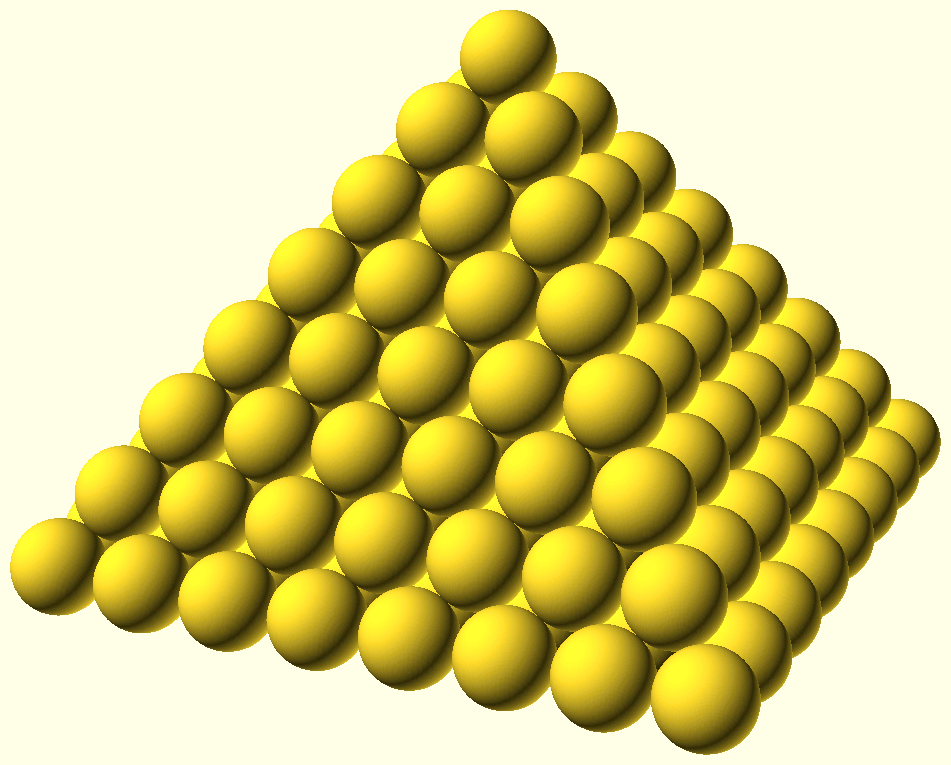
204 is a square pyramidal number.

204 is a refactorable number. 204 is a square pyramidal number: 204 balls may be stacked in a pyramid whose base is an 8 × 8 square, as it is a sum of all the perfect squares from 1 to 64 (i.e. 1^{2} + 2^{2} + 3^{2} + 4^{2} + 5^{2} + 6^{2} + 7^{2} + 8^{2} = 204). Its square, 204^{2} = 41616, is the fourth square triangular number. As a figurate number, 204 is also a nonagonal number and a truncated triangular pyramid number. 204 is a member of the Mian-Chowla sequence.

There are exactly 204 irreducible quintic polynomials over a four-element field, exactly 204 ways to place three non-attacking chess queens on a 5 × 5 board, exactly 204 squares of an infinite chess move that are eight knight's moves from the center, exactly 204 strings of length 11 over a three-letter alphabet with no consecutively-repeated substring, and exactly 204 ways of immersing an oriented circle into the oriented plane so that it has four double points.

Both 204 and its square are sums of a pair of twin primes: 204 = 101 + 103 and 204^{2} = 41616 = 20807 + 20809. The only smaller numbers with the same property are 12 and 84.
