= 172 =

172 may refer to:

- 172 BC
- AD 172
- 172 (number), the natural number following 171 and preceding 173
- Cessna 172 "Skyhawk", a single engine, high wing, light airplane produced by Cessna Aircraft Company
- 172 BC
- British Rail Class 172, a Diesel multiple unit built by Bombardier Transportation part of the Turbostar family in 2010
