= 207 (number) =

← 206	207	208 →
- ← 200 201 202 203 204 205 206 207 208 209 →: List of numbers; Integers; ← 0 100 200 300 400 500 600 700 800 900 →
- Cardinal: two hundred seven
- Ordinal: 207th (two hundred seventh)
- Factorization: 3^{2} × 23
- Divisors: 1, 3, 9, 23, 69, 207
- Greek numeral: ΣΖ´
- Roman numeral: CCVII, ccvii
- Binary: 11001111_{2}
- Ternary: 21200_{3}
- Senary: 543_{6}
- Octal: 317_{8}
- Duodecimal: 153_{12}
- Hexadecimal: CF_{16}

207 (two hundred [and] seven) is the natural number following 206 and preceding 208.

== In Mathematics ==
- 207 is a Wedderburn-Etherington number.
- There are exactly 207 different matchstick graphs with eight edges.
- 207 is a deficient number, as 207's proper divisors (divisors not including the number itself) only add up to 105: $1+3+9+23+69=105<207$.
