= 168 (number) =

← 167	168	169 →
- ← 160 161 162 163 164 165 166 167 168 169 →: List of numbers; Integers; ← 0 100 200 300 400 500 600 700 800 900 →
- Cardinal: one hundred sixty-eight
- Ordinal: 168th (one hundred sixty-eighth)
- Factorization: 2^{3} × 3 × 7
- Divisors: 1, 2, 3, 4, 6, 7, 8, 12, 14, 21, 24, 28, 42, 56, 84, 168
- Greek numeral: ΡΞΗ´
- Roman numeral: CLXVIII, clxviii
- Binary: 10101000_{2}
- Ternary: 20020_{3}
- Senary: 440_{6}
- Octal: 250_{8}
- Duodecimal: 120_{12}
- Hexadecimal: A8_{16}

168 (one hundred [and] sixty-eight) is the natural number following 167 and preceding 169.

== Mathematics ==
168 is a Dedekind number, and an idoneal numbers, and a Cunningham number.

=== Abstract algebra ===
168 is the order of the second smallest nonabelian simple group $\mathrm {PSL}(2,7).$ From Hurwitz's automorphisms theorem, 168 is the maximum possible number of automorphisms of a genus 3 Riemann surface, this maximum being achieved by the Klein quartic, whose symmetry group is $\mathrm {PSL}(2,7)$.

== In other fields ==
=== Numerology ===
Some Chinese consider 168 a lucky number, because 一六八 ("168") Mandarin pinyin: yīliùbā is roughly homophonous with the phrase "一路發" Mandarin pinyin: yīlùfā which means "fortune all the way", or, as the United States Mint claims, "Prosperity Forever".
