= 202 (number) =

← 201	202	203 →
- ← 200 201 202 203 204 205 206 207 208 209 →: List of numbers; Integers; ← 0 100 200 300 400 500 600 700 800 900 →
- Cardinal: two hundred two
- Ordinal: 202nd (two hundred second)
- Factorization: 2 × 101
- Divisors: 1, 2, 101, 202
- Greek numeral: ΣΒ´
- Roman numeral: CCII, ccii
- Binary: 11001010_{2}
- Ternary: 21111_{3}
- Senary: 534_{6}
- Octal: 312_{8}
- Duodecimal: 14A_{12}
- Hexadecimal: CA_{16}

202 (two hundred [and] two) is the natural number following 201 and preceding 203.

== In mathematics ==
202 is a Smith number, meaning that its digit sum and the sum of digits of its prime factors are equal. It is also a strobogrammatic number, meaning that when shown on a seven-segment display, turning the display upside-down shows the same number.

There are exactly 202 partitions of 32 (a power of two) into smaller powers of two. There are also 202 distinct (non-congruent) polygons that can be formed by connecting all eight vertices of a regular octagon into a cycle, and 202 distinct (non-isomorphic) directed graphs on four unlabeled vertices, not having any isolated vertices.
