= 8888 =

8888 may refer to:

- 8888 (Philippines), a national public service hotline
- 8888 Keystone Crossing, one of the tallest buildings in Indianapolis, Indiana, U.S.
- 8888 Uprising, a nationwide protest in Myanmar in August 1988
- 88:88, a 2015 Canadian experimental docudrama film
- BS 8888, a British Standard
- CONOP 8888, a zombie defence training document
- CSX 8888 incident, an incident in 2001 involving American locomotive #8888
- 8.8.8.8, a Google Public DNS (domain name system)
- Arena Sofia (currently known as Arena 8888 Sofia)

== See also ==
- 888 (disambiguation)
