= 191st Division =

191st Division may refer to:

- 191st Division (People's Republic of China)
- 191st Rifle Division, Soviet Union

== See also ==
- List of military divisions by number
- 191st Regiment (disambiguation)
- 191st (disambiguation)
