= 205 (number) =

← 204	205	206 →
- ← 200 201 202 203 204 205 206 207 208 209 →: List of numbers; Integers; ← 0 100 200 300 400 500 600 700 800 900 →
- Cardinal: two hundred five
- Ordinal: 205th (two hundred fifth)
- Factorization: 5 × 41
- Divisors: 1, 5, 41, 205
- Greek numeral: ΣΕ´
- Roman numeral: CCV, ccv
- Binary: 11001101_{2}
- Ternary: 21121_{3}
- Senary: 541_{6}
- Octal: 315_{8}
- Duodecimal: 151_{12}
- Hexadecimal: CD_{16}

205 in a Winnepeg snowbank

205 (two hundred [and] five) is the natural number following 204 and preceding 206.

== In mathematics ==
205 is a lucky number, and a Wolstenholme number. On an infinite chessboard, a knight can reach exactly 205 squares within four moves or less. There are 205 different ways of forming a connected graph by adding six edges to a set of five labeled vertices.
