= 201 (number) =

← 200	201	202 →
- ← 200 201 202 203 204 205 206 207 208 209 →: List of numbers; Integers; ← 0 100 200 300 400 500 600 700 800 900 →
- Cardinal: two hundred one
- Ordinal: 201st (two hundred first)
- Factorization: 3 × 67
- Divisors: 1, 3, 67, 201
- Greek numeral: ΣΑ´
- Roman numeral: CCI, cci
- Binary: 11001001_{2}
- Ternary: 21110_{3}
- Senary: 533_{6}
- Octal: 311_{8}
- Duodecimal: 149_{12}
- Hexadecimal: C9_{16}

201 (two hundred [and] one) is the natural number following 200 and preceding 202.

== In mathematics ==
As the two proper factors of 201, 3 and 67, are both Gaussian primes, 201 is a Blum integer.

== In other fields ==
- 201 is the course number of basic or entry-level courses at some Canadian universities (such as the University of Calgary and Athabasca University), especially if the number 101 is allocated to remedial courses.
- 201 is also short for 201 Poplar, the jail in Memphis, Tennessee, and alluded to in many rap songs from Memphis artists.

=== In popular culture ===
- The binary representation of 201, namely "11001001," is the name of a 1988 episode of the science fiction series Star Trek: The Next Generation.
- "201" is the 201st episode of American adult animated sitcom South Park.
