= 167 (number) =

← 166	167	168 →
- ← 160 161 162 163 164 165 166 167 168 169 →: List of numbers; Integers; ← 0 100 200 300 400 500 600 700 800 900 →
- Cardinal: one hundred sixty-seven
- Ordinal: 167th (one hundred sixty-seventh)
- Factorization: prime
- Prime: 39th, chen, gaussian, safe
- Divisors: 1, 167
- Greek numeral: ΡΞΖ´
- Roman numeral: CLXVII, clxvii
- Binary: 10100111_{2}
- Ternary: 20012_{3}
- Senary: 435_{6}
- Octal: 247_{8}
- Duodecimal: 11B_{12}
- Hexadecimal: A7_{16}

167 (one hundred [and] sixty-seven) is the natural number following 166 and preceding 168.

== In mathematics ==
167 is the 39th prime number, an emirp, an isolated prime, a Chen prime, a Gaussian prime, a safe prime, and an Eisenstein prime with no imaginary part and a real part of the form $3n - 1$.

167 is the smallest number which requires six terms when expressed using the greedy algorithm as a sum of squares, 167 = 144 + 16 + 4 + 1 + 1 + 1, although by Lagrange's four-square theorem its non-greedy expression as a sum of squares can be shorter, e.g. 167 = 121 + 36 + 9 + 1.

167 is a full reptend prime in base 10, since the decimal expansion of 1/167 repeats the following 166 digits: 0.00598802395209580838323353293413173652694610778443113772455089820359281437125748502994 0119760479041916167664670658682634730538922155688622754491017964071856287425149700...

167 is a highly cototient number, as it is the smallest number k with exactly 15 solutions to the equation x - φ(x) = k. It is also a strictly non-palindromic number.

167 is the smallest multi-digit prime such that the product of digits is equal to the number of digits times the sum of the digits, i. e., 1×6×7 = 3×(1+6+7)

167 is the smallest positive integer d such that the imaginary quadratic field Q(√–d) has class number = 11.
