= 209 (number) =

← 208	209	210 →
- ← 200 201 202 203 204 205 206 207 208 209 →: List of numbers; Integers; ← 0 100 200 300 400 500 600 700 800 900 →
- Cardinal: two hundred nine
- Ordinal: 209th (two hundred ninth)
- Factorization: 11 × 19
- Divisors: 1, 11, 19, 209
- Greek numeral: ΣΘ´
- Roman numeral: CCIX, ccix
- Binary: 11010001_{2}
- Ternary: 21202_{3}
- Senary: 545_{6}
- Octal: 321_{8}
- Duodecimal: 155_{12}
- Hexadecimal: D1_{16}

209 (two hundred [and] nine) is the natural number following 208 and preceding 210.

== In mathematics ==
There are 209 spanning trees in a 2 × 5 grid graph, 209 partial permutations on four elements, and 209 distinct undirected simple graphs on 7 or fewer unlabeled vertices.

209 is the smallest number with six representations as a sum of three positive squares. These representations are:

209 = 1^{2} + 8^{2} + 12^{2} = 2^{2} + 3^{2} + 14^{2} = 2^{2} + 6^{2} + 13^{2} = 3^{2} + 10^{2} + 10^{2} = 4^{2} + 7^{2} + 12^{2} = 8^{2} + 8^{2} + 9^{2}.

By Legendre's three-square theorem, all numbers of that can not be expressed in the form 4^{k}(8m+7) have representations as sums of three squares, but this theorem does not explain the high number of such representations for 209.

209 = 2 × 3 × 5 × 7 − 1, one less than the product of the first four prime numbers. Therefore, 209 is a Euclid number of the second kind, also called a Kummer number. One standard proof of Euclid's theorem that there are infinitely many primes uses the Kummer numbers, by observing that the prime factors of any Kummer number must be distinct from the primes in its product formula as a Kummer number. However, the Kummer numbers are not all prime, and as a semiprime (the product of two smaller prime numbers 11 × 19), 209 is the first example of a composite Kummer number.
