= 206 (number) =

← 205	206	207 →
- ← 200 201 202 203 204 205 206 207 208 209 →: List of numbers; Integers; ← 0 100 200 300 400 500 600 700 800 900 →
- Cardinal: two hundred six
- Ordinal: 206th (two hundred sixth)
- Factorization: 2 × 103
- Divisors: 1, 2, 103, 206
- Greek numeral: ΣϚ´
- Roman numeral: CCVI, ccvi
- Binary: 11001110_{2}
- Ternary: 21122_{3}
- Senary: 542_{6}
- Octal: 316_{8}
- Duodecimal: 152_{12}
- Hexadecimal: CE_{16}

206 (two hundred [and] six) is the natural number following 205 and preceding 207.

== In mathematics ==
206 is both a nontotient and a noncototient. 206 is an untouchable number. It is the lowest positive integer (when written in English as "two hundred and six") to employ all of the vowels once only, not including Y. The other numbers sharing this property are 230, 250, 260, 602, 640, 5000, 8000, 9000, 26,000, 80,000 and 90,000. 206 and 207 form the second pair of consecutive numbers (after 14 and 15) whose sums of divisors are equal. There are exactly 206 different linear forests on five labeled nodes, and exactly 206 regular semigroups of order four up to isomorphism and anti-isomorphism.
