= 203 (number) =

| ← 202 | 203 | 204 → |
- ← 200 201 202 203 204 205 206 207 208 209 →: List of numbers; Integers; ← 0 100 200 300 400 500 600 700 800 900 →
- Cardinal: two hundred three
- Ordinal: 203rd (two hundred third)
- Factorization: 7 × 29
- Divisors: 1, 7, 29, 203
- Greek numeral: ΣΓ´
- Roman numeral: CCIII, cciii
- Binary: 11001011_{2}
- Ternary: 21112_{3}
- Senary: 535_{6}
- Octal: 313_{8}
- Duodecimal: 14B_{12}
- Hexadecimal: CB_{16}

203 (two hundred [and] three) is the natural number following 202 and preceding 204.

== In mathematics ==
203 is the seventh Bell number, giving the number of partitions of a set of size 6. 203 integer squares (not necessarily of unit size) can be found in a staircase-shaped polyomino formed by stacks of unit squares of heights ranging from 1 to 12. 203 different triangles can be made from three rods with integer lengths of at most 12.
