= Giuseppe Melfi =

Italo-Swiss mathematician

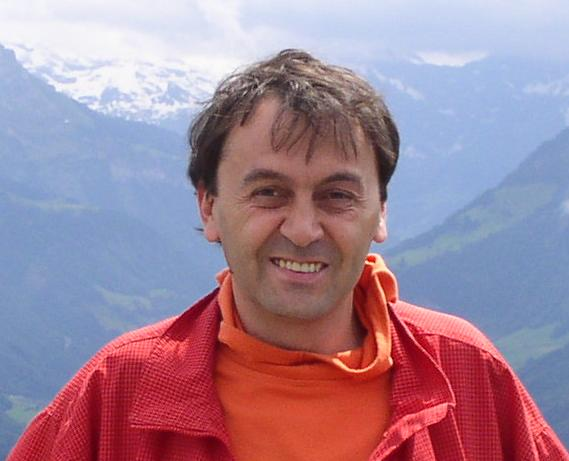
- Born: 11 June 1967 (age 59); Uznach, Switzerland
- Known for: Practical numbers Ramanujan-type identities
- Awards: Premio Ulisse (2010)
- Scientific career
- Fields: Mathematics
- Workplaces: University of Neuchâtel; University of Applied Sciences Western Switzerland; University of Teacher Education BEJUNE

Giuseppe Melfi (June 11, 1967) is an Italo-Swiss mathematician who works on practical numbers and modular forms.

== Career ==
He gained his PhD in mathematics in 1997 at the University of Pisa. After some time spent at the University of Lausanne during 1997-2000, Melfi was appointed at the University of Neuchâtel, as well as at the University of Applied Sciences Western Switzerland and at the local University of Teacher Education.

== Work ==
His major contributions are in the field of practical numbers. This prime-like sequence of numbers is known for having an asymptotic behavior and other distribution properties similar to the sequence of primes. Melfi proved two conjectures both raised in 1984: the first one states that every even number is a sum of two practical numbers, a property that is still unproven for primes. The second one is that there exist infinitely many triples of practical numbers of the form $m-2,m,m+2$. He also proved that there exist infinitely many Fibonacci numbers that are practicals

Another notable contribution has been in an application of the theory of modular forms, where he found new Ramanujan-type identities for the sum-of-divisor functions. His seven new identities extended the ten other identities found by Ramanujan in 1913. In particular he found the remarkable identity

$$\sum_{\stackrel{0< k< n}{k\equiv1\bmod3}} \sigma(k)\sigma(n-k)=\frac19\sigma_3(n) \qquad \mbox{  for }n\equiv2\bmod3$$

where $\sigma(n)$ is the sum of the divisors of $n$ and $\sigma_3(n)$ is the sum of the third powers of the divisors of $n$.

In 1996 Paul Erdős wrote him two letters in which several problems were proposed. They met in Eger in July , but Erdős died in September. In the subsequent decade Melfi studied some Erdős problems with some notable contribution in particular concerning sum-free sequences.

Among other problems in elementary number theory, he is the author of a theorem that allowed him to get a 5328-digit number that has been for a while the largest known primitive weird number. Since 2019, with a 14712-digits primitive weird number, he shares this record, with a team of collaborators.

In applied mathematics his research interests include probability and simulation.

== Selected research publications ==
- Giuseppe Melfi and Yadolah Dodge (2008). Premiers pas en simulation. Springer-Verlag. ISBN 978-2-287-79493-3.
- Deshouillers, Jean-Marc; Erdős, Pál; Melfi, Giuseppe (1999), "On a question about sum-free sequences", Discrete Mathematics, 200 (1–3): 49–54, doi:10.1016/s0012-365x(98)00322-7, MR 1692278.
- Melfi, Giuseppe (2015). "On the conditional infiniteness of primitive weird numbers". Journal of Number Theory. 147. Elsevier: 508–514. doi:10.1016/j.jnt.2014.07.024.
- Melfi, Giuseppe (1996), "On two conjectures about practical numbers", Journal of Number Theory, 56 (1): 205–210, doi:10.1006/jnth.1996.0012, MR 1370203

== See also ==
- Applications of randomness
