= 191st =

191st may refer to:

== Military units ==
- 191st (Southern Alberta) Battalion, CEF, a unit in the Canadian Expeditionary Force during the First World War
- 191st (Hertfordshire and Essex Yeomanry) Field Regiment, Royal Artillery, a British unit of World War II
- 191st Air Refueling Squadron, a unit of the Utah Air National Guard
- 191st Airlift Group, an airlift unit located at Selfridge ANGB, Michigan
- 191st Infantry Brigade (United States), formed as part of the United States Army Reserve's 96th Division
- 191st Ohio Infantry Regiment (or 191st OVI), an infantry regiment in the Union Army during the American Civil War

== Other uses ==
- 191st Street station, a station on the IRT Broadway – Seventh Avenue Line of the New York City Subway

== See also ==
- 191 (number)
- AD 191, the year 191 (CXCI) of the Julian calendar
- 191 BC
- July 10, 191st day of the year in a standard year
