= 888 =

888 commonly refers to:

- 888 (number), an integer
- 888 BC, a year of the 9th century BC
- AD 888, a year of the Julian calendar

888 or triple eight may also refer to:

== Telecommunication ==
- 888 is prefix/area code for toll-free telephone numbers in the North American Numbering Plan
- 888 is the number used to dial up teletext subtitles on some programmes shown on European television channels
- Qualcomm Snapdragon 888, a chip system for mobile devices

== Gambling ==
- 888casino, an online casino
- 888 Holdings, an online gambling company, trading as "888.com"
- 888poker, an online poker room
- 888sport, an online bookmaker

== Art and entertainment ==
- 888chan, an image board
- 888 (manga), by Noriko Kuwata
- Triple 8, a British boy band
- 888, a song by Cavetown

== Other uses ==
- Ducati 888, a motorcycle
- Route 888 (Israel), a road in Israel
- Triple Eight Race Engineering, an Australian motor racing team, related to the British team
- Triple Eight Racing, an English motor racing team
- 8/8/8 is a nickname for the 2008 South Ossetia War that broke out on August 8, 2008
- 888 is a contraction of the labour movement's slogan for the Eight-hour day
- 4-hole extension of the ISO 838 standard of filing holes punched in paper is sometimes called "888"

== See also ==
- List of highways numbered 888
- 8888 (disambiguation)
