= Centered tetrahedral number =

Centered figurate number representing a tetrahedron

- Total no. of terms: Infinity
- Subsequence of: Polyhedral numbers
- Formula: $\frac{(2n+1)\,(n^2+n+3)}{3}$
- First terms: 1, 5, 15, 35, 69, 121, 195
- OEIS index: A005894; Centered tetrahedral

In mathematics, a centered tetrahedral number is a centered figurate number that represents a tetrahedron. That is, it counts the dots in a three-dimensional dot pattern with a single dot surrounded by tetrahedral shells. The $n$th centered tetrahedral number, starting at $n=0$ for a single dot, is:

$\displaystyle (2n+1)\times{(n^2+n+3) \over 3}.$

The first such numbers are:

1, 5, 15, 35, 69, 121, 195, 295, 425, 589, 791, ...
