= 193rd =

193rd may refer to:

- 193rd Battalion (Nova Scotia Highlanders), CEF, a unit in the Canadian Expeditionary Force during the First World War
- 193rd Infantry Brigade (United States), ordered to active military service and organized at Camp Swift, Texas in February 1943
- 193rd Rifle Division (Soviet Union), a Red Army infantry division that was reorganised after World War II
- 193rd Special Operations Squadron, a unit of the Pennsylvania Air National Guard that flies the EC-130J Commando Solo

== See also ==
- 193 (number)
- AD 193, the year 193 (CXCIII) of the Julian calendar
