= 191 (number) =

← 190	191	192 →
- ← 190 191 192 193 194 195 196 197 198 199 →: List of numbers; Integers; ← 0 100 200 300 400 500 600 700 800 900 →
- Cardinal: one hundred ninety-one
- Ordinal: 191st (one hundred ninety-first)
- Factorization: prime
- Prime: 43rd
- Greek numeral: ΡϞΑ´
- Roman numeral: CXCI, cxci
- Binary: 10111111_{2}
- Ternary: 21002_{3}
- Senary: 515_{6}
- Octal: 277_{8}
- Duodecimal: 13B_{12}
- Hexadecimal: BF_{16}

191 (one hundred [and] ninety-one) is the natural number following 190 and preceding 192.

== In mathematics ==
191 is a prime number, part of a prime quadruplet of four primes: 191, 193, 197, and 199. Because doubling and adding one produces another prime number (383), 191 is a Sophie Germain prime. It is the smallest prime that is not a full repetend prime in any base from 2 to 10; in fact, the smallest base for which 191 is a full period prime is base 19.

== See also ==
- 191 (disambiguation)
