= 163 =

163 may refer to:

== Dates ==
- AD 163
- 163 BC, a year of the pre-Julian Roman calendar

== Number ==
- 163 (number), the natural number following 162 and preceding 164

== Other uses ==
- 163 (New Jersey bus)
- Messerschmitt Me 163
- U.S. Route 163, a 64-mile (103 km) U.S highway
- California State Route 163, a state highway in San Diego, California
- Virginia State Route 163, a primary state highway in the U.S. state of Virginia
- Washington State Route 163, a state highway in Washington state
- 163.com or NetEase
- Tatra 163, a heavy truck
- Namco 163, a memory management controller chip used in Famicom cartridges
