= BS 8888 =

Standard on technical product documentation

BS 8888 is the British standard developed by the BSI Group for technical product documentation, geometric product specification, geometric tolerance specification and engineering drawings.

== History ==
=== 2008 update ===
A significant change in the 2008 revision is that there is no longer a requirement to state whether specifications have been tolerance in accordance with either the Principle of Independency or the Principle of Dependency.

=== 2017 update ===
This updated version of the standard has been restructured to be more aligned to the workflow of designers and engineers to assist throughout the design process. The standard now references 3D geometry, not only as drawings but also allowing a 3D surface to be used as a datum feature.

== Purpose ==
BS 8888 performs three fundamental tasks :

- Unifying all the ISO standards applicable to technical specification;
- Giving an index of ISO standards involved with different principles of technical product specification (TPS);
- Providing BSI with a platform for further explanatory commentary where necessary.
