= Anhedral =

Anhedral may refer to:

- Anhedral angle, the downward angle from horizontal of the wings or tailplane of a fixed-wing aircraft
- Anhedral (petrology), a rock texture without crystal faces or cross-section shape in thin section
