= 172 BC =

172 BC in various calendars
- Gregorian calendar: 172 BC; CLXXII BC
- Ab urbe condita: 582
- Ancient Egypt era: XXXIII dynasty, 152
- Pharaoh: Ptolemy VI Philometor, 9
- Ancient Greek Olympiad (summer): 152nd Olympiad (victor)¹
- Assyrian calendar: 4579
- Balinese saka calendar: N/A
- Bengali calendar: −765 – −764
- Berber calendar: 779
- Buddhist calendar: 373
- Burmese calendar: −809
- Byzantine calendar: 5337–5338
- Chinese calendar: 戊辰年 (Earth Dragon); 2526 or 2319 — to — 己巳年 (Earth Snake); 2527 or 2320
- Coptic calendar: −455 – −454
- Discordian calendar: 995
- Ethiopian calendar: −179 – −178
- Hebrew calendar: 3589–3590
- Hindu calendars
- Vikram Samvat: −115 – −114
- Shaka Samvat: N/A
- Kali Yuga: 2929–2930
- Holocene calendar: 9829
- Iranian calendar: 793 BP – 792 BP
- Islamic calendar: 817 BH – 816 BH
- Javanese calendar: N/A
- Julian calendar: N/A
- Korean calendar: 2162
- Minguo calendar: 2083 before ROC 民前2083年
- Nanakshahi calendar: −1639
- Seleucid era: 140/141 AG
- Thai solar calendar: 371–372
- Tibetan calendar: ས་ཕོ་འབྲུག་ལོ་ (male Earth-Dragon) −45 or −426 or −1198 — to — ས་མོ་སྦྲུལ་ལོ་ (female Earth-Snake) −44 or −425 or −1197

Year 172 BC was a year of the pre-Julian Roman calendar. At the time it was known as the Year of the Consulship of Laenas and Ligus. The denomination 172 BC for this year has been used since the early medieval period, when the Anno Domini calendar era became the prevalent method in Europe for naming years.

== Events ==
=== By place ===
==== Greece ====
- Eumenes II of Pergamum travels to Rome to warn the Roman Senate of the danger from Perseus of Macedon. On his return from Rome, Eumenes II is nearly killed at Delphi and Perseus is suspected of being the instigator.

==== Seleucid Empire ====
- Since the reign of the Seleucid king, Antiochus III, the Jewish inhabitants of Judea enjoy extensive autonomy under their high priest. However, they are divided into two parties, the orthodox Hasideans (Pious Ones) and a reform party that favours Hellenism. Antiochus IV supports the reform party because of the financial support they provide him with. In return for a considerable payment, he has permitted the high priest, Jason, to build a gymnasium in Jerusalem and to introduce the Greek mode of educating young people. Jason's time as high priest is brought to an abrupt end when he sends Menelaus, the brother of Simon the Benjamite, to deliver money to Antiochus IV. Menelaus takes this opportunity to "outbid" Jason for the priesthood, resulting in Antiochus IV confirming Menelaus as the High Priest.

==== Carthage ====
- The peace treaty at the end of the Second Punic War requires that all border disputes involving Carthage be arbitrated by the Roman Senate and requires Carthage to get explicit Roman approval before going to war. As a result, envoys from Carthage appear before the Roman Senate to request resolution of a boundary dispute with Numidia. The dispute is decided in Numidia's favour.

== Deaths ==
- Quintus Fulvius Flaccus, Roman consul and general
- Xiahou Ying, Chinese official and minister coachman
