= Flight 45 =

Flight 45, Flight 045, or Flight U-45 may refer to:

- Eastern Air Lines Flight 45, a mid-air collision involving a Douglas DC-3-201C and a Douglas A-26C-35-DT Invader in 1945
- Aeroflot Flight U-45, an Ilyushin Il-18 which flew into a mountain in February 1970
- Flying Tiger Line Flight 45, a Douglas DC-8-63F that crashed 2000 feet short of the runway in July 1970
- Alitalia Flight 45, a Vickers Viscount 785D that crashed into a mountain in bad weather in 1964
