= Lectionary 193 =

Lectionary ℓ 193
- New Testament manuscript
- Text: Evangelistarion †
- Date: 14th century
- Script: Greek
- Now at: British Library
- Size: 25.2 cm by 17.5 cm
- Hand: bold

Lectionary 193, designated by siglum ℓ 193 (in the Gregory-Aland numbering) is a Greek manuscript of the New Testament, on paper. Palaeographically it has been assigned to the 14th century. Scrivener labelled it by 266^{evl}.

== Description ==
The codex contains Lessons from the Gospels of John, Matthew, Luke lectionary (Evangelistarium), on 281 paper leaves (25.2 cm by 17.5 cm), with some lacunae.

The text is written in Greek minuscule letters, in one column per page, 23-24 lines per page. It is written in bold hand and very peculiar style.

There are daily lessons from Easter to Pentecost.

== History ==
Usually it is dated to the 14th century. It is dated by the colophon to the year 1335. The manuscript was written in the monastery of George.

G. Alefson bought the manuscript in Cyprus in 1851, Boone re-bought it for the British Museum in 1854.

The manuscript was examined by Bloomfield. It was added to the list of New Testament manuscripts by Scrivener (number 266). Gregory saw it in 1883.

The manuscript is not cited in the critical editions of the Greek New Testament (UBS3).

Currently the codex is located in the British Library (Add MS 19993) in London.

== See also ==
- List of New Testament lectionaries
- Biblical manuscript
- Textual criticism

== Bibliography ==
- S. T. Bloomfield, Pal. soc., 12, 206.
- A. Turyn, Dated Greek Manuscripts of the Thirteenth and Fourteenth Centuries in the Libraries of Great Britain, Dumbarton Oaks Series XVII, (Washington, D. C., 1980), 67, p. 99.
