= 191st Ohio Infantry Regiment =

- Active: January 1865 to September 5, 1865
- Country: United States
- Allegiance: Union
- Branch: Infantry

The 191nd Ohio Infantry Regiment, sometimes 191st Ohio Volunteer Infantry (or 191st OVI) was an infantry regiment in the Union Army during the American Civil War.

== Service ==
The 191st Ohio Infantry was organized at Camp Chase in Columbus, Ohio January through February 1865 and mustered in for one year service under the command of Colonel Robert Lewis Kimberly.

The regiment left Ohio for Harpers Ferry, West Virginia, March 10, 1865. It was attached to 2nd Brigade, 1st Provisional Division, Army of the Shenandoah, March 20. Marched to Charleston March 21. Transferred to 2nd (Ohio) Brigade, 2nd Provisional Division, March 27. Duty near Charleston until April 4. Operations in the Shenandoah Valley in vicinity of Winchester, Stevenson's Depot, and Jordan's Springs, April to August.

The 191st Ohio Infantry mustered out of service August 27, 1865, at Winchester, Virginia, and was discharged September 5, 1865.

== Casualties ==
The regiment lost a total of 29 enlisted men during service, all due to disease.

== Commanders ==
- Colonel Robert Lewis Kimberly

== See also ==
- List of Ohio Civil War units
- Ohio in the Civil War
