= 191 BC =

191 BC in various calendars
- Gregorian calendar: 191 BC; CXCI BC
- Ab urbe condita: 563
- Ancient Egypt era: XXXIII dynasty, 133
- Pharaoh: Ptolemy V Epiphanes, 13
- Ancient Greek Olympiad (summer): 147th Olympiad, year 2
- Assyrian calendar: 4560
- Balinese saka calendar: N/A
- Bengali calendar: −784 – −783
- Berber calendar: 760
- Buddhist calendar: 354
- Burmese calendar: −828
- Byzantine calendar: 5318–5319
- Chinese calendar: 己酉年 (Earth Rooster); 2507 or 2300 — to — 庚戌年 (Metal Dog); 2508 or 2301
- Coptic calendar: −474 – −473
- Discordian calendar: 976
- Ethiopian calendar: −198 – −197
- Hebrew calendar: 3570–3571
- Hindu calendars
- Vikram Samvat: −134 – −133
- Shaka Samvat: N/A
- Kali Yuga: 2910–2911
- Holocene calendar: 9810
- Iranian calendar: 812 BP – 811 BP
- Islamic calendar: 837 BH – 836 BH
- Javanese calendar: N/A
- Julian calendar: N/A
- Korean calendar: 2143
- Minguo calendar: 2102 before ROC 民前2102年
- Nanakshahi calendar: −1658
- Seleucid era: 121/122 AG
- Thai solar calendar: 352–353
- Tibetan calendar: ས་མོ་བྱ་ལོ་ (female Earth-Bird) −64 or −445 or −1217 — to — ལྕགས་ཕོ་ཁྱི་ལོ་ (male Iron-Dog) −63 or −444 or −1216

Year 191 BC was a year of the pre-Julian Roman calendar. At the time it was known as the Year of the Consulship of Nasica and Glabrio (or, less frequently, year 563 Ab urbe condita). The denomination 191 BC for this year has been used since the early medieval period, when the Anno Domini calendar era became the prevalent method in Europe for naming years.

== Events ==
=== By place ===
==== Roman Republic ====
- The Romans under Manius Acilius Glabrio and Cato the Elder cut the Seleucid king Antiochus III off from his reinforcements in Thrace and outflank his position at the pass of Thermopylae in the Battle of Thermopylae. With the remainder of his troops, Antiochus flees to Chalcis on Euboea and from there he retreats by sea to Ephesus.
- Manius Acilius Glabrio then turns his attention to the Aetolian League, which has persuaded Antiochus to declare war against Rome, and is only prevented from crushing them by the intercession of Titus Quinctius Flamininus.
- Scipio Africanus persuades the Roman Senate to continue the war against Antiochus III by making him the chief commander and allowing him and his brother, Lucius Cornelius Scipio Asiaticus, to follow Antiochus into Anatolia.
- The Roman calendar, which is four months ahead of the seasons, is adjusted (by Lex Acilia de intercalando).
- Cisalpine Gaul becomes a Roman province.

==== Carthage ====
- The Carthaginians manage to collect the indemnity due to Rome (through the peace treaty signed between them ten years earlier) but not payable in full for 50 years. The Romans, in order to keep their hold on Carthage, refuse to accept the early payment of the indemnity.

==== Parthia ====
- Arsaces II, king of Parthia is succeeded by his cousin Phriapatius.

==== China ====
- Emperor Hui of Han lifts the ban on Confucian writings ordered in 213 BC.

== Deaths ==
- Arsaces II, King of Parthia, who had reigned from about 211 BC
