= Flight 191 =

Flight 191 may refer to:

- Aeroflot Flight 191 (1963), crashed on final approach to Ashgabat International Airport, killing 12 people
- X-15 Flight 191 (1967), or X-15 Flight 3-65-97, experimental test plane, broke apart in flight, killing its test pilot
- Prinair Flight 191 (1972), crashed at Mercedita Airport in Ponce, Puerto Rico, killing 5 people
- American Airlines Flight 191 (1979), crashed shortly after takeoff from Chicago O'Hare Airport, killing 273; outside of the September 11 attacks, it is the single deadliest aircraft accident in United States history
- Delta Air Lines Flight 191 (1985), crashed while on final approach to Dallas-Fort Worth International Airport, killing 137 people
- JetBlue Flight 191 (2012), a flight from New York John F. Kennedy Airport to Las Vegas, Nevada; diverted to Amarillo, Texas, due to erratic pilot behavior

== See also ==
- Comair Flight 5191 (2006), crashed after attempting to takeoff from the wrong runway in Lexington, Kentucky, killing 49; only the first officer survived
