= Strobogrammatic number =

Numeral ambigram

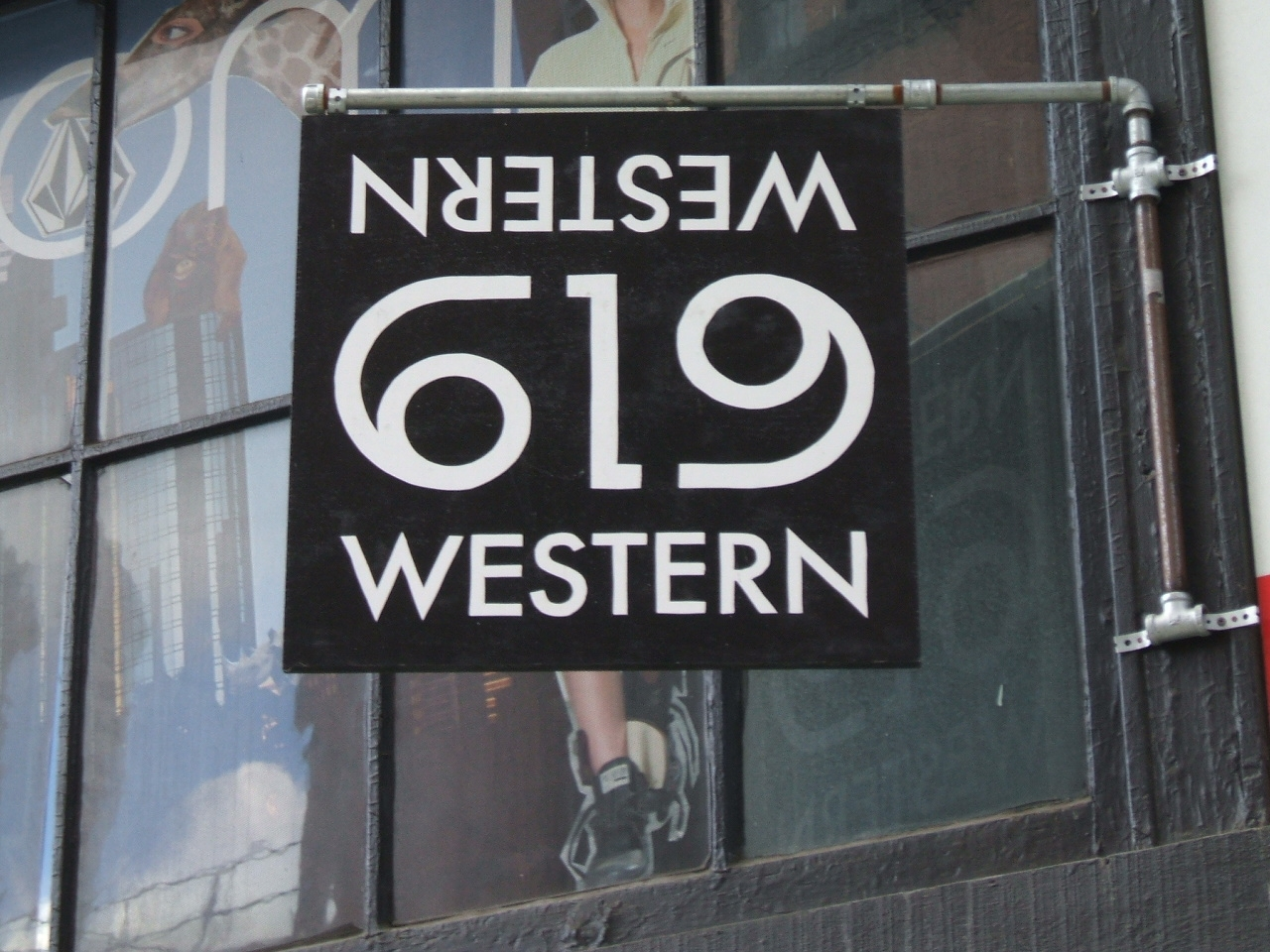
The number 619 is strobogrammatic.

A strobogrammatic number is a number whose numeral is rotationally symmetric, so that it appears the same when rotated by 180 degrees. In other words, the numeral looks the same right-side up and upside down (e.g., 69, 96, 1001). A strobogrammatic prime is a strobogrammatic number that is also a prime number, i.e., a number that is only divisible by one and itself (e.g., 11). It is a type of ambigram, words and numbers that retain their meaning when viewed from a different perspective, such as palindromes.

== Description ==
With standard handwriting, the numbers, 0, 1, 8 are symmetrical around the horizontal axis, and 6 and 9 are the same as each other when rotated 180 degrees. In such a system, the first few strobogrammatic numbers are:

0, 1, 8, 11, 69, 88, 96, 101, 111, 181, 609, 619, 689, 808, 818, 888, 906, 916, 986, 1001, 1111, 1691, 1881, 1961, 6009, 6119, 6699, 6889, 6969, 8008, 8118, 8698, 8888, 8968, 9006, 9116, 9696, 9886, 9966, … (sequence A000787 in the OEIS)

The first few strobogrammatic primes are:

11, 101, 181, 619, 16091, 18181, 19861, 61819, 116911, 119611, 160091, 169691, 191161, 196961, 686989, 688889, … (sequence A007597 in the OEIS)

The years 1881 and 1961 were the most recent strobogrammatic years; the next strobogrammatic year will be 6009.

Although amateur aficionados of mathematics are quite interested in this concept, professional mathematicians generally are not. Like the concept of repunits and palindromic numbers, the concept of strobogrammatic numbers is base-dependent (expanding to base-sixteen, for example, produces the additional symmetries of 3/E; some variants of duodecimal systems also have this and a symmetrical x). Unlike palindromes, it is also font dependent. The concept of strobogrammatic numbers is not neatly expressible algebraically, the way that the concept of repunits is, or even the concept of palindromic numbers.

== Nonstandard systems ==
The strobogrammatic properties of a given number vary by typeface. For instance, in an ornate serif type, the numbers 2 and 7 may be rotations of each other; however, in a seven-segment display emulator, this correspondence is lost, but 2 and 5 are both symmetrical. There are sets of glyphs for writing numbers in base 10, such as the Devanagari and Gurmukhi of India in which the numbers listed above are not strobogrammatic at all.

In binary, given a glyph for 1 consisting of a single line without hooks or serifs and a sufficiently symmetric glyph for 0, the strobogrammatic numbers are the same as the palindromic numbers and also the same as the dihedral numbers. In particular, all Mersenne numbers are strobogrammatic in binary. Dihedral primes that do not use 2 or 5 are also strobogrammatic primes in binary.

The natural numbers 0 and 1 are strobogrammatic in every base, with a sufficiently symmetric font, and they are the only natural numbers with this feature, since every natural number larger than one is represented by 10 in its own base.

In duodecimal, the strobogrammatic numbers are (using inverted two and three for ten and eleven, respectively)

0, 1, 8, 11, 2↊, 3↋, 69, 88, 96, ↊2, ↋3, 101, 111, 181, 20↊, 21↊, 28↊, 30↋, 31↋, 38↋, 609, 619, 689, 808, 818, 888, 906, 916, 986, ↊02, ↊12, ↊82, ↋03, ↋13, ↋83, …

Examples of strobogrammatic primes in duodecimal are:

11, 3↋, 111, 181, 30↋, 12↊1, 13↋1, 311↋, 396↋, 3↊2↋, 11111, 11811, 130↋1, 16191, 18881, 1↋831, 3000↋, 3181↋, 328↊↋, 331↋↋, 338↋↋, 3689↋, 3818↋, 3888↋, …

== Upside down year ==
The most recent upside down year was 1961, and before that were sequentially 1881 and 1691, unless leading zeroes are allowed to be arbitrarily added. In this case, 02020 would be the most recent upside down year. Before that were 1111 and 1001, and before that were the 3-digit years 986, 916, 906, 888, 818, 808, 689, 619, 609, 181, 111, and 101.

If the number 2 is included (in the case of seven-segment displays), then the most recent upside down year is 2002. However, 2002 is not a strobogrammatic number due to the 2 being different in traditional fonts.

Using only the digits 0, 1, 6, 8 and 9, the next upside-down year will not occur until 6009. Allowing for the numbers 2, 5 and 7, the next such year will be 2112.

Mad magazine parodied the upside down year in March 1961.
