= Practical number =

Number whose sums of distinct divisors represent all smaller numbers

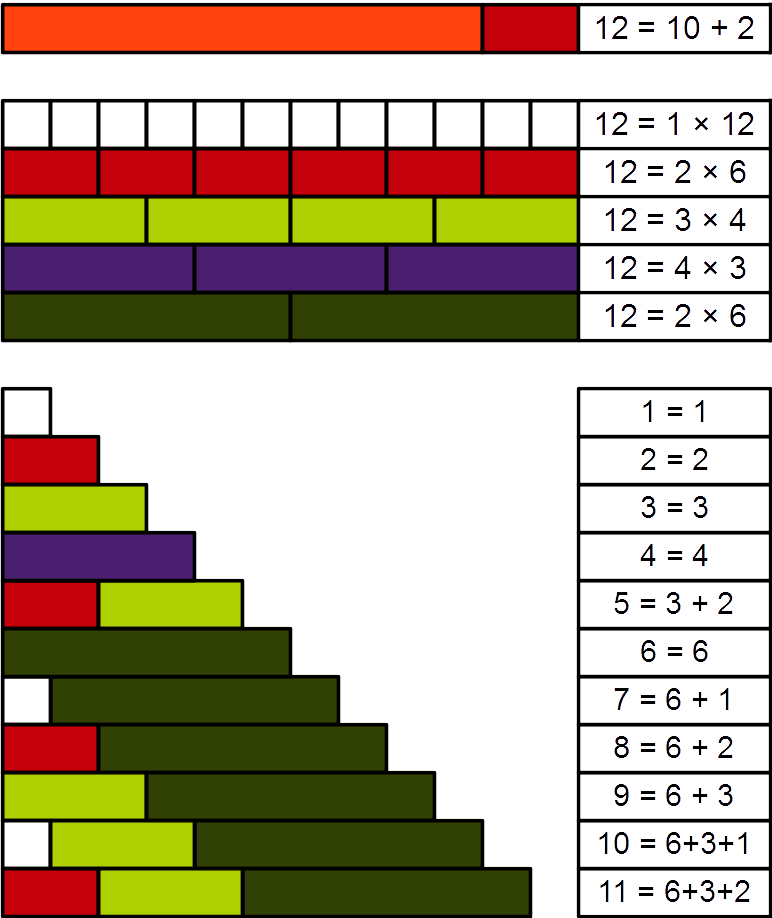
Demonstration of the practicality of the number 12

In number theory, a practical number or panarithmic number is a positive integer $n$ such that all smaller positive integers can be represented as sums of distinct divisors of $n$. For example, 12 is a practical number because all the numbers from 1 to 11 can be expressed as sums of its divisors 1, 2, 3, 4, and 6: as well as these divisors themselves, we have 5 = 3 + 2, 7 = 6 + 1, 8 = 6 + 2, 9 = 6 + 3, 10 = 6 + 3 + 1, and 11 = 6 + 3 + 2.

The sequence of practical numbers (sequence A005153 in the OEIS) begins

1, 2, 4, 6, 8, 12, 16, 18, 20, 24, 28, 30, 32, 36, 40, 42, 48, 54, 56, 60, 64, 66, 72, 78, 80, 84, 88, 90, 96, 100, 104, 108, 112, 120, 126, 128, 132, 140, 144, 150....

Practical numbers were used by Fibonacci in his Liber Abaci (1202) in connection with the problem of representing rational numbers as Egyptian fractions. Fibonacci does not formally define practical numbers, but he gives a table of Egyptian fraction expansions for fractions with practical denominators.

The name "practical number" is due to Srinivasan (1948). He noted that "the subdivisions of money, weights, and measures involve numbers like 4, 12, 16, 20 and 28 which are usually supposed to be so inconvenient as to deserve replacement by powers of 10." His partial classification of these numbers was completed by Stewart (1954) and Sierpiński (1955). This characterization makes it possible to determine whether a number is practical by examining its prime factorization. Every even perfect number and every power of two is also a practical number.

Practical numbers have also been shown to be analogous with prime numbers in many of their properties.

== Characterization of practical numbers ==
The original characterisation by Srinivasan (1948) stated that a practical number cannot be a deficient number, that is one of which the sum of all divisors (including 1 and itself) is less than twice the number unless the deficiency is one. If the ordered set of all divisors of the practical number $n$ is ${d_1, d_2,..., d_j}$ with $d_1=1$ and $d_j=n$, then Srinivasan's statement can be expressed by the inequality
$$2n\leq1+\sum_{i=1}^j d_i.$$
In other words, the ordered sequence of all divisors ${d_1<d_2<...<d_j}$ of a practical number has to be a complete sub-sequence.

This partial characterization was extended and completed by Stewart (1954) and Sierpiński (1955) who showed that it is straightforward to determine whether a number is practical from its prime factorization. A positive integer greater than one with prime factorization $n=p_1^{\alpha_1}...p_k^{\alpha_k}$ (with the primes in sorted order $p_1<p_2<\dots<p_k$) is practical if and only if each of its prime factors $p_i$ is small enough for $p_i-1$ to have a representation as a sum of smaller divisors. For this to be true, the first prime $p_1$ must equal 2 and, for every i from 2 to k, each successive prime $p_i$ must obey the inequality

$$p_i\leq1+\sigma(p_1^{\alpha_1}p_2^{\alpha_2}\dots p_{i-1}^{\alpha_{i-1}})=1+\sigma(p_1^{\alpha_1})\sigma(p_2^{\alpha_2})\dots \sigma(p_{i-1}^{\alpha_{i-1}})=1+\prod_{j=1}^{i-1}\frac{p_j^{\alpha_j+1}-1}{p_j-1},$$

where $\sigma(x)$ denotes the sum of the divisors of x. For example, 2 × 3^{2} × 29 × 823 = 429606 is practical, because the inequality above holds for each of its prime factors: 3 ≤ σ(2) + 1 = 4, 29 ≤ σ(2 × 3^{2}) + 1 = 40, and 823 ≤ σ(2 × 3^{2} × 29) + 1 = 1171.

The condition stated above is necessary and sufficient for a number to be practical. In one direction, this condition is necessary in order to be able to represent $p_i-1$ as a sum of divisors of $n$, because if the inequality failed to be true then even adding together all the smaller divisors would give a sum too small to reach $p_i-1$. In the other direction, the condition is sufficient, as can be shown by induction. More strongly, if the factorization of $n$ satisfies the condition above, then any $m \le \sigma(n)$ can be represented as a sum of divisors of $n$, by the following sequence of steps:

- By induction on $j\in[1,\alpha_k]$, it can be shown that $p_k^j\leq 1+\sigma(n/p_k^{\alpha_k-(j-1)})$. Hence $p_k^{\alpha_k}\leq 1+\sigma(n/p_k)$.
- Since the internals $[q p_k^{\alpha_k}, q p_k^{\alpha_k}+\sigma(n/p_k)]$ cover $[1,\sigma(n)]$ for $1\leq q\leq \sigma(n/p_k^{\alpha_k})$, there are such a $q$ and some $r\in[0,\sigma(n/p_k)]$ such that $m=q p_k^{\alpha_k}+r$.
- Since $q\le\sigma(n/p_k^{\alpha_k})$ and $n/p_k^{\alpha_k}$ can be shown by induction to be practical, we can find a representation of q as a sum of divisors of $n/p_k^{\alpha_k}$.
- Since $r\le \sigma(n/p_k)$, and since $n/p_k$ can be shown by induction to be practical, we can find a representation of r as a sum of divisors of $n/p_k$.
- The divisors representing r, together with $p_k^{\alpha_k}$ times each of the divisors representing q, together form a representation of m as a sum of divisors of $n$.

== Properties ==
- The only odd practical number is 1, because if $n$ is an odd number greater than 2, then 2 cannot be expressed as the sum of distinct divisors of $n$. More strongly, Srinivasan (1948) observes that other than 1 and 2, every practical number is divisible by 4 or 6 (or both).
- The product of two practical numbers is also a practical number. Equivalently, the set of all practical numbers is closed under multiplication. More strongly, the least common multiple of any two practical numbers is also a practical number.
- From the above characterization by Stewart and Sierpiński it can be seen that if $n$ is a practical number and $d$ is one of its divisors then $n\cdot d$ must also be a practical number. Furthermore, a practical number multiplied by power combinations of any of its divisors is also practical.
- In the set of all practical numbers there is a primitive set of practical numbers. A primitive practical number is either practical and squarefree or practical and when divided by any of its prime factors whose factorization exponent is greater than 1 is no longer practical. The sequence of primitive practical numbers (sequence A267124 in the OEIS) begins
1, 2, 6, 20, 28, 30, 42, 66, 78, 88, 104, 140, 204, 210, 220, 228, 260, 272, 276, 304, 306, 308, 330, 340, 342, 348, 364, 368, 380, 390, 414, 460 ...
- Every positive integer has a practical multiple. For instance, for every integer $n$, its multiple $2^{\lfloor\log_2 n\rfloor}n$ is practical.
- Every odd prime has a primitive practical multiple. For instance, for every odd prime $p$, its multiple $2^{\lfloor\log_2 p\rfloor}p$ is primitive practical. This is because $2^{\lfloor\log_2 p\rfloor}p$ is practical but when divided by 2 is no longer practical. A good example is a Mersenne prime of the form $2^p-1$. Its primitive practical multiple is $2^{p-1}(2^p-1)$ which is an even perfect number.

== Relation to other classes of numbers ==
Several other notable sets of integers consist only of practical numbers:

- From the above properties with $n$ a practical number and $d$ one of its divisors (that is, $d|n$) then $n\cdot d$ must also be a practical number therefore six times every power of 3 must be a practical number as well as six times every power of 2.
- Every power of two is a practical number. Powers of two trivially satisfy the characterization of practical numbers in terms of their prime factorizations: the only prime in their factorizations, p_{1}, equals two as required.
- Every even perfect number is also a practical number. This follows from Leonhard Euler's result that an even perfect number must have the form $2^{k-1}(2^k-1)$. The odd part of this factorization equals the sum of the divisors of the even part, so every odd prime factor of such a number must be at most the sum of the divisors of the even part of the number. Therefore, this number must satisfy the characterization of practical numbers. A similar argument can be used to show that an even perfect number when divided by 2 is no longer practical. Therefore, every even perfect number is also a primitive practical number.
- Every primorial (the product of the first $i$ primes, for some $i$) is practical. For the first two primorials, two and six, this is clear. Each successive primorial is formed by multiplying a prime number $p_i$ by a smaller primorial that is divisible by both two and the next smaller prime, $p_{i-1}$. By Bertrand's postulate, $p_i<2p_{i-1}$, so each successive prime factor in the primorial is less than one of the divisors of the previous primorial. By induction, it follows that every primorial satisfies the characterization of practical numbers. Because a primorial is, by definition, squarefree it is also a primitive practical number.
- Generalizing the primorials, any number that is the product of nonzero powers of the first $k$ primes must also be practical. This includes Ramanujan's highly composite numbers (numbers with more divisors than any smaller positive integer) as well as the factorial numbers.

== Practical numbers and Egyptian fractions ==
If $n$ is practical, then any rational number of the form $m/n$ with $m<n$ may be represented as a sum $\sum d_i/n$ where each $d_i$ is a distinct divisor of $n$. Each term in this sum simplifies to a unit fraction, so such a sum provides a representation of $m/n$ as an Egyptian fraction. For instance,
$$\frac{13}{20}=\frac{10}{20}+\frac{2}{20}+\frac{1}{20}=\frac12+\frac1{10}+\frac1{20}.$$

Fibonacci, in his 1202 book Liber Abaci lists several methods for finding Egyptian fraction representations of a rational number. Of these, the first is to test whether the number is itself already a unit fraction, but the second is to search for a representation of the numerator as a sum of divisors of the denominator, as described above. This method is only guaranteed to succeed for denominators that are practical. Fibonacci provides tables of these representations for fractions having as denominators the practical numbers 6, 8, 12, 20, 24, 60, and 100.

Vose (1985) showed that every rational number $x/y$ has an Egyptian fraction representation with $O(\sqrt{\log y})$ terms. The proof involves finding a sequence of practical numbers $n_i$ with the property that every number less than $n_i$ may be written as a sum of $O(\sqrt{\log n_{i-1}})$ distinct divisors of $n_i$. Then, $i$ is chosen so that $n_{i-1}<y<n_i$, and $xn_i$ is divided by $y$ giving quotient $q$ and remainder $r$. It follows from these choices that $\frac{x}{y}=\frac{q}{n_i}+\frac{r}{yn_i}$. Expanding both numerators on the right hand side of this formula into sums of divisors of $n_i$ results in the desired Egyptian fraction representation. Tenenbaum & Yokota (1990) use a similar technique involving a different sequence of practical numbers to show that every rational number $x/y$ has an Egyptian fraction representation in which the largest denominator is $O(y\log^2 y/\log\log y)$.

According to a September 2015 conjecture by Zhi-Wei Sun, every positive rational number has an Egyptian fraction representation in which every denominator is a practical number. The conjecture was proved by David Eppstein (2021).

== Analogies with prime numbers ==
One reason for interest in practical numbers is that many of their properties are similar to properties of the prime numbers. Indeed, theorems analogous to Goldbach's conjecture and the twin prime conjecture are known for practical numbers: every positive even integer is the sum of two practical numbers, and there exist infinitely many triples of practical numbers $(x-2,x,x+2)$. Melfi also showed that there are infinitely many practical Fibonacci numbers (sequence A124105 in the OEIS); and Sanna proved that at least $C n / \log n$ of the first $n$ terms of every Lucas sequence are practical numbers, where $C > 0$ is a constant and $n$ is sufficiently large. The analogous questions of the existence of infinitely many Fibonacci primes, or prime in a Lucas sequence, are open. Hausman & Shapiro (1984) showed that there always exists a practical number in the interval $[x^2,(x+1)^2)]$ for any positive real $x$, a result analogous to Legendre's conjecture for primes. Moreover, for all sufficiently large $x$, the interval $[x-x^{0.4872},x]$ contains many practical numbers.

Let $p(x)$ count how many practical numbers are at most $x$. Margenstern (1991) conjectured that $p(x)$ is asymptotic to $cx/\log x$ for some constant $c$, a formula which resembles the prime number theorem, strengthening the earlier claim of Erdős & Loxton (1979) that the practical numbers have density zero in the integers. Improving on an estimate of Tenenbaum (1986), Saias (1997) found that $p(x)$ has order of magnitude $x/\log x$. Weingartner (2015) proved Margenstern's conjecture. We have
$$p(x) = \frac{c x}{\log x}\left(1 + O\!\left(\frac{1}{\log x}\right)\right),$$
where $c=1.33607...$ Thus the practical numbers are about 33.6% more numerous than the prime numbers. The exact value of the constant factor $c$ is given by
$$c= \frac{1}{1-e^{-\gamma}} \sum_{n \ \text{practical}} \frac{1}{n}  \Biggl( \sum_{p\le \sigma(n)+1}\frac{\log p}{p-1} - \log n\Biggr) \prod_{p\le \sigma(n)+1} \left(1-\frac{1}{p}\right),$$
where $\gamma$ is the Euler–Mascheroni constant and $p$ runs over primes.

As with prime numbers in an arithmetic progression, given two natural numbers $a$ and $q$, we have
$$|\{ n \le x: n \text{ practical and } n\equiv a \bmod q \}|=\frac{c_{q,a} x}{\log x} +O_q\left(\frac{x}{(\log x)^2}\right).$$
The constant factor $c_{q,a}$ is positive if, and only if, there is more than one practical number congruent to $a \bmod q$. If $\gcd(q,a)=\gcd(q,b)$, then $c_{q,a}=c_{q,b}$. For example, about 38.26% of practical numbers have a last decimal digit of 0, while the last digits of 2, 4, 6, 8 each occur with the same relative frequency of 15.43%.

== The number of prime factors, the number of divisors, and the sum of divisors ==
The Erdős–Kac theorem implies that for a large random integer $n$, the number of prime factors of $n$ (counted with or without multiplicity) follows an approximate normal distribution with mean $\log\log n$ and variance $\log\log n$. The corresponding result for practical numbers implies that for a large random practical number $n$, the number of prime factors is approximately normal with mean $C \log\log n$ and variance $V \log\log n$, where $C = 1/(1-e^{-\gamma}) = 2.280\ldots$ and $V=0.414\ldots$. That is, most large integers $n$ have about $\log\log n$ prime factors, while most large practical numbers $n$ have about $C \log\log n \approx 2.28 \log\log n$ prime factors.

As a consequence, most large integers $n$ have $2^{(1+o(1))\log\log n} = (\log n)^{0.693\ldots}$ divisors, while most large practical numbers $n$ have $2^{(C+o(1))\log\log n} = (\log n)^{1.580\ldots}$ divisors. In both cases, the average number of divisors is much larger than the typical number of divisors: for integers $n \le x$, the average number of divisors is about $\log x$, while for practical numbers $n \le x$, it is about $(\log x)^{1.713\ldots}$.

The average value of the sum-of-divisors function $\sigma(n)$, for integers $n \le x$, as well as for practical numbers $n \le x$, has order of magnitude $x$.
