= 180 (number) =

← 179	180	181 →
- ← 180 181 182 183 184 185 186 187 188 189 →: List of numbers; Integers; ← 0 100 200 300 400 500 600 700 800 900 →
- Cardinal: one hundred eighty
- Ordinal: 180th (one hundred eightieth)
- Factorization: 2^{2} × 3^{2} × 5
- Divisors: 1, 2, 3, 4, 5, 6, 9, 10, 12, 15, 18, 20, 30, 36, 45, 60, 90, 180
- Greek numeral: ΡΠ´
- Roman numeral: CLXXX, clxxx
- Binary: 10110100_{2}
- Ternary: 20200_{3}
- Senary: 500_{6}
- Octal: 264_{8}
- Duodecimal: 130_{12}
- Hexadecimal: B4_{16}

180 (one hundred [and] eighty) is the natural number following 179 and preceding 181.

== In mathematics ==
180 is an abundant number, with its proper divisors summing up to 366. 180 is also the 11th highly composite number, a positive integer with 18 divisors, more than any smaller positive integer. One of the consequences of 180 having so many divisors is that it is a practical number, meaning that any positive number smaller than 180 that is not a divisor of 180 can be expressed as the sum of some of 180's divisors. 180 is a Harshad number and a refactorable number.

180 is the sum of two square numbers: 12^{2} + 6^{2}. It can be expressed as either the sum of six consecutive prime numbers: 19 + 23 + 29 + 31 + 37 + 41, or the sum of eight consecutive prime numbers: 11 + 13 + 17 + 19 + 23 + 29 + 31 + 37. 180 is an Ulam number, which can be expressed as a sum of earlier terms in the Ulam sequence only as 177 + 3.

180 is a 61-gonal number, while 61 is the 18th prime number.

Half a circle has 180 degrees, and thus a U-turn is also referred to as a 180.

Summing Euler's totient function φ(x) over the first + 24 integers gives 180.

In binary it is a digitally balanced number, since its binary representation has the same number of zeros as ones (10110100).

A triangle has three interior angles that collectively total 180 degrees. In general, the interior angles of an $n$-sided polygon add to $(n-2) \times 180$ degrees.
