= 170 (number) =

← 169	170	171 →
- ← 170 171 172 173 174 175 176 177 178 179 →: List of numbers; Integers; ← 0 100 200 300 400 500 600 700 800 900 →
- Cardinal: one hundred seventy
- Ordinal: 170th (one hundred seventieth)
- Factorization: 2 × 5 × 17
- Divisors: 1, 2, 5, 10, 17, 34, 85, 170
- Greek numeral: ΡΟ´
- Roman numeral: CLXX, clxx
- Binary: 10101010_{2}
- Ternary: 20022_{3}
- Senary: 442_{6}
- Octal: 252_{8}
- Duodecimal: 122_{12}
- Hexadecimal: AA_{16}

170 (one hundred [and] seventy) is the natural number following 169 and preceding 171.

== In mathematics ==
170 is the smallest n for which φ(n) and σ(n) are both square (64 and 324 respectively). But 170 is never a solution for φ(x), making it a nontotient. Nor is it ever a solution to x - φ(x), making it a noncototient.

170 is a repdigit in base 4 (2222) and base 16 (AA), as well as in bases 33, 84, and 169. It is also a sphenic number.

170 is the largest integer for which its factorial can be stored in IEEE 754 double-precision floating-point format. This is probably why it is also the largest factorial that Google's built-in calculator will calculate, returning the answer as 170! = 7.25741562 × 10^{306}.

There are 170 different cyclic Gilbreath permutations on 12 elements, and therefore there are 170 different real periodic points of order 12 on the Mandelbrot set.
