= 189 (number) =

← 188	189	190 →
- ← 180 181 182 183 184 185 186 187 188 189 →: List of numbers; Integers; ← 0 100 200 300 400 500 600 700 800 900 →
- Cardinal: one hundred eighty-nine
- Ordinal: 189th (one hundred eighty-ninth)
- Factorization: 3^{3} × 7
- Divisors: 1, 3, 7, 9, 21, 27, 63, 189
- Greek numeral: ΡΠΘ´
- Roman numeral: CLXXXIX, clxxxix
- Binary: 10111101_{2}
- Ternary: 21000_{3}
- Senary: 513_{6}
- Octal: 275_{8}
- Duodecimal: 139_{12}
- Hexadecimal: BD_{16}

189 (one hundred [and] eighty-nine) is the natural number following 188 and preceding 190.

== In mathematics ==
189 is a centered cube number and a heptagonal number. The centered cube numbers are the sums of two consecutive cubes, and 189 can be written as sum of two cubes in two ways: 4^{3} + 5^{3} and 6^{3} + (−3)^{3}. The smallest number that can be written as the sum of two positive cubes in two ways is 1729.

The largest prime number that can be represented in 256-bit arithmetic is the "ultra-useful prime" 2^{256} − 189, used in quasi-Monte Carlo methods and in some cryptographic systems.

== See also ==
- The year AD 189 or 189 BC
- List of highways numbered 189
