= 169 (number) =

← 168	169	170 →
- ← 160 161 162 163 164 165 166 167 168 169 →: List of numbers; Integers; ← 0 100 200 300 400 500 600 700 800 900 →
- Cardinal: one hundred sixty-nine
- Ordinal: 169th (one hundred sixty-ninth)
- Factorization: 13^{2}
- Divisors: 1, 13, 169
- Greek numeral: ΡΞΘ´
- Roman numeral: CLXIX, clxix
- Binary: 10101001_{2}
- Ternary: 20021_{3}
- Senary: 441_{6}
- Octal: 251_{8}
- Duodecimal: 121_{12}
- Hexadecimal: A9_{16}

169 (one hundred [and] sixty-nine) is the natural number following 168 and preceding 170.

== In mathematics ==
169 is an odd number, a composite number, and a deficient number.

169 is a square number: 13 × 13 = 169, and if each number is reversed the equation is still true: 31 × 31 = 961. 144 shares this property: 12 × 12 = 144, 21 × 21 = 441.

169 is one of the few squares to also be a centered hexagonal number. Like all odd squares, it is a centered octagonal number. 169 is an odd-indexed Pell number, thus it is also a Markov number, appearing in the solutions (2, 169, 985), (2, 29, 169), (29, 169, 14701), etc. 169 is the sum of seven consecutive primes: 13 + 17 + 19 + 23 + 29 + 31 + 37. 169 is a difference in consecutive cubes, equaling $8^3-7^3.$

== In other fields ==
- 169 is known in the computing world as the first number of an automatic IPv4 address assigned by TCP/IP when no external networking device is contactable.
