= 190 (number) =

← 189	190	191 →
- ← 190 191 192 193 194 195 196 197 198 199 →: List of numbers; Integers; ← 0 100 200 300 400 500 600 700 800 900 →
- Cardinal: one hundred ninety
- Ordinal: 190th (one hundred ninetieth)
- Factorization: 2 × 5 × 19
- Divisors: 1, 2, 5, 10, 19, 38, 95, 190
- Greek numeral: ΡϞ´
- Roman numeral: CXC, cxc
- Binary: 10111110_{2}
- Ternary: 21001_{3}
- Senary: 514_{6}
- Octal: 276_{8}
- Duodecimal: 13A_{12}
- Hexadecimal: BE_{16}

190 (one hundred [and] ninety) is the natural number following 189 and preceding 191.

== In mathematics ==
190 is a triangular number, a hexagonal number, and a centered nonagonal number, the fourth figurate number (after 1, 28, and 91) with that combination of properties. It is also a truncated square pyramid number.

== See also ==
- 190 (disambiguation)
