= 199 (number) =

← 198	199	200 →
- ← 190 191 192 193 194 195 196 197 198 199 →: List of numbers; Integers; ← 0 100 200 300 400 500 600 700 800 900 →
- Cardinal: one hundred ninety-nine
- Ordinal: 199th (one hundred ninety-ninth)
- Factorization: prime
- Prime: 46th
- Greek numeral: ΡϞΘ´
- Roman numeral: CXCIX, cxcix
- Binary: 11000111_{2}
- Ternary: 21101_{3}
- Senary: 531_{6}
- Octal: 307_{8}
- Duodecimal: 147_{12}
- Hexadecimal: C7_{16}

199 (one hundred [and] ninety-nine) is the natural number following 198 and preceding 200.

== In mathematics ==
It is a prime number and the fourth part of a prime quadruplet: 191, 193, 197, 199.

199 is the smallest natural number that takes more than two iterations to compute its digital root as a repeated digit sum:
$$\begin{align}
199&\mapsto 1+9+9=19\\
&\mapsto 1+9=10\\
&\mapsto 1+0=1.
\end{align}$$
Thus, its additive persistence is three, and it is the smallest number of persistence three.

If the digits are rearranged, it will still be prime. 199, 919, 991.
