= 200 (number) =

← 199	200	201 →
- ← 200 201 202 203 204 205 206 207 208 209 →: List of numbers; Integers; ← 0 100 200 300 400 500 600 700 800 900 →
- Cardinal: two hundred
- Ordinal: 200th (two hundredth)
- Factorization: 2^{3} × 5^{2}
- Greek numeral: Σ´
- Roman numeral: CC, cc
- Binary: 11001000_{2}
- Ternary: 21102_{3}
- Senary: 532_{6}
- Octal: 310_{8}
- Duodecimal: 148_{12}
- Hexadecimal: C8_{16}
- Armenian: Մ
- Hebrew: ר
- Babylonian cuneiform: 𒐗⟪
- Egyptian hieroglyph: 𓍣

200 (two hundred) is the natural number following 199 and preceding 201.

== In mathematics ==
200 is an abundant number, as 265, the sum of its proper divisors, is greater than itself.

The number appears in the Padovan sequence, preceded by 86, 114, and 151 (it is the sum of the first two of these).

The sum of Euler's totient function φ(x) over the first twenty-five integers is 200.

200 is the smallest base 10 unprimeable number – it cannot be turned into a prime number by changing just one of its digits to any other digit. It is also a Harshad number.

200 is an Achilles number.
