= List of musician and band name etymologies =

This is a list of band names, with their name origins explained.

== # ==
- ? and the Mysterians – ? and the Mysterians took their name from The Mysterians, a 1957 Japanese science fiction film about alien invaders. Their lead singer, Rudy Martínez, adopted the pseudonym "?" to match the sci-fi theme and cultivate an eccentric, mysterious public persona.
- 2 Brothers on the 4th Floor – The band name 2 Brothers on the 4th Floor originated from the literal living situation of its creators, Dutch brothers Bobby and Martin Boer. The name was chosen to reflect their roots and the humble, DIY beginnings of their musical journey. It was a straightforward description of who was making the music (two brothers) and where they were making it (the 4th floor).
- 3 Doors Down – The band started out with drummer/vocalist Brad Arnold, bassist Todd Harrell and guitarist Matt Roberts. As they decided to tour outside of their hometown of Escatawpa, Mississippi and into Foley, Alabama, they came up with their official name as they saw a building with a sign with most of its letters fallen off, reading "Doors Down". Since at the time they started out with 3 band members the name stuck and called themselves 3 Doors Down.
- 4 Non Blondes – The band got their name from an awkward moment in a public place when a mother looked at them with judgment. As bassist Christa Hillhouse shared, the four band members sat near a trash can where a child wanted to pick up a piece of old pizza. The mother stopped the child and said it was dirty because of people and pigeons, and she stared right at the band. The group realized they did not match the sunny blonde California look, so they called themselves the 4 Non Blondes as a badge of pride.
- 5 Seconds of Summer – 5 Seconds of Summer (5SOS) got their name randomly from guitarist Michael Clifford in 2011, who thought of it while struggling to find a band name, potentially while watching the TV show Scrubs. They chose 5SOS because it was a catchy, simple phrase with a good acronym that they felt suited the band.
- 9mm Parabellum Bullet – The Japanese rock band 9mm Parabellum Bullet got their name from their drummer, Chihiro Kamijo, who came up with the idea when he saw the phrase written on a piece of paper on a wall and thought it "looked cool". The name itself is derived from the 9mm Parabellum cartridge, a popular firearm ammunition, which stems from the Latin phrase, "Si vis pacem, para bellum"—meaning "If you seek peace, prepare for war".
- 10cc – By his own account, Jonathan King chose the name for the band after signing them to his record label UK Records, after having a dream in which he was standing in front of the Hammersmith Odeon in London where the boarding read "10cc The Best Band in the World". A widely repeated claim, disputed by King, but confirmed in a 1988 interview by Lol Creme and also on the webpage of Graham Gouldman's current line-up, is that the band name represented a volume of semen that was more than the average amount ejaculated by men ("cc" being an abbreviation of cubic centimetre), thus emphasising their potency or prowess.
- 16volt – The industrial rock band, formed in Portland, Oregon, in 1988 by Eric Powell, derives its name from a conceptual blend of mechanical power and industrial texture rather than a direct reference to a specific electrical component. The "16" and "volt" combination was chosen to represent a high-energy, electrifying, and aggressive electronic sound, aligning with the industrial heavy-metal aesthetic popular in the early 1990s. Powell, a songwriter and programmer who largely operated the project as a one-man studio act in its formative years before signing to Re-Constriction Records in 1992, desired a name that reflected the abrasive electronic textures, raw punk guitars, and the "power" of the genre's sound. While sometimes erroneously linked to slang or literal car parts, the origin is rooted in creating a moniker that felt modern, dangerous, and energetic, often described as "industrial-informed beats".
- 24-7 Spyz – the moniker 24-7 Spyz was chosen to represent a lifestyle of constant creativity and observation, with guitarist Jimi Hazel and original vocalist Peter "P. Fluid" Forrest being key figures in the group's inception. The "24-7" signifies doing something all day, every day—specifically, that the members were constantly "spying" on music, observing life, and creating art, according to band lore. While Jimi Hazel is the founding guitarist and leader, the band was established with Peter Forrest ("P. Fluid") in 1986, and the name emerged from their shared vision of a "multi-genre" group in the Bronx. The name reflected the band's, and particularly P. Fluid's, "reckless abandon" and high energy during their early days.
- 36 Crazyfists – The American metalcore band, formed in Anchorage, Alaska in 1994, derived their name from the 1977 Hong Kong martial arts film "The 36 Crazy Fists" (also known as "Jackie Chan and the 36 Crazy Fists"). The name was chosen to reflect a chaotic, energetic vibe.
- 38 Special – According to Don Barnes, the band in its early stages was practicing at a vacant warehouse they believed to be sufficiently isolated for noise not to pose a problem. It did, however, and the neighbors called the police. When officers arrived, the band was unable to open the door to the room they were in because it was padlocked, and told the police that. "That's alright", they recalled one cop saying, "I'll just let this .38 special do the talking" before he shot the lock off.
- 38th Parallel – The band derived their name from the 38th parallel north, the line of latitude that served as the pre-Korean War boundary dividing North Korea and South Korea. This name symbolizes a division, reflecting the band's identity.
- 40 Below Summer – The nu-metal band got its name from a period of severe weather and local hardship in their home state of New Jersey. The name was inspired by a brutal cold snap in New Jersey where temperatures dropped significantly, juxtaposed against the band's feelings of being "below" or at a low point. The members have described the name as representing a state of mind or an atmosphere. It captures a feeling of being frozen or stuck in a dark place, even when things should be "warm" (like summer). It reflects the aggressive yet melodic and often melancholic nature of their music.
- 50 Cent – The artist adopted the nickname "50 Cent" as a metaphor for change, after having served time at boot camp for selling drugs to an undercover police officer. The name was inspired by Kelvin Martin, a 1980s Brooklyn robber known as "50 Cent"; the artist chose it "because it says everything I want it to say. I'm the same kind of person 50 Cent was. I provide for myself by any means."
- 54-40 – From the location for the Canada–United States border (54º 40' N) sought by the administration of U.S. president James Polk during the 19th-century Oregon boundary dispute.
- 311 – 311 is an Omaha, Nebraska, police code for indecent exposure. One rainy day, 311 bassist P-Nut and some friends went skinny dipping in a public pool. They were apprehended by police. One of P-Nut's friends, Jim Watson, was arrested, cuffed (naked), and taken home to his parents. He was issued a citation for a code 311. The band found the incident amusing, so they based their name on it.
- 1349 – Named after the year the Bubonic plague reached Norway.
- 1910 Fruitgum Company - The album liner notes explain Frank Jeckell found a bubblegum wrapper in a jacket found inside an attic which had the name on it. However, Frank has stated in interviews that this wasn't true, and that when the band (originally Jeckell and the Hydes) signed with Super K Productions, they were given the name. He later happened to find a slot machine that had the text inscribed under one of the jackpot reels "Copyright 1910 Bell-Fruit-Gum Mills Novelty Co., Chicago" and believes the 1910 Fruitgum Company name originated from it.
- The 1975 – Lead singer Matthew Healy said in an interview that he came up with the name after discovering an old art journal from a beatnik, with one of the dates listed as "June 1st, the 1975". Healy said that he thought the placement of "the" in a recorded date was intriguing, and decided to use it as the name for the band.
- 10,000 Maniacs – From the 1965 horror film Two Thousand Maniacs.

== A ==
- a-ha – A title that member Pål Waaktaar contemplated giving to a song. Morten Harket was looking through Waaktaar's notebook and came across the name "a-ha". He liked it and said, "That's a great name. That's what we should call ourselves." After checking dictionaries in several languages, they found out that a-ha was an international way of expressing recognition, with positive connotations. It was short, easy to say, and unusual.
- A-Teens – The 'A' stands for ABBA since they started as a cover band for the group; their name was originally ABBA-Teens but was changed upon request from Björn Ulvaeus and Benny Andersson to avoid confusion. The group later did other songs, such as "Upside Down".
- Aborted – The Belgian death metal band, formed in 1995 by vocalist Sven de Caluwé, who selected the name primarily for a practical marketing reason: to ensure the band's CDs would appear first in the "A" section of music store racks. Beyond this alphabetical strategy, the name "Aborted" was chosen because it fit the extreme, gory, and horror-themed aesthetic of deathgrind music that the band wanted to create. Embracing a "brutal" sound influenced by bands like Carcass, the name perfectly matched their early lyrical focus on gore, splatter, and later, their thematic appreciation for 1980s horror films and visceral imagery.
- ABBA – a palindromic acronym from the initials of the first names of the band members: Agnetha Fältskog, Björn Ulvaeus, Benny Andersson and Anni-Frid Lyngstad. A producer of canned fish was already using the name Abba so the band asked permission from them to use the name ABBA.
- AC/DC – Malcolm and Angus Young developed the idea for the band's name after their sister Margaret pointed out the "AC/DC" symbol on her electric sewing machine.
- Ace of Base – The band's first studio was in the basement of a car repair shop, and they considered themselves to be the "masters" of the studio. "Ace of Base" was derived from "masters of the basement".
- Acid Drinkers – The Polish thrash metal band got their name in September 1986 from an incident where founders Tomasz "Titus" Pukacki and Robert "Litza" Friedrich sold concert tickets in Poznań and immediately spent the money on cheap, locally produced, sour Polish wine known as "kwas" (meaning "acid").
- Adam and the Ants – Stuart Goddard had been performing as Adam Ant since shortly after seeing the Sex Pistols perform. "I really knew I wanted to be Adam, because Adam was the first man", he explained years later. "Ant I chose because, if there's a nuclear explosion, the ants will survive." The band he formed originally was known as the Ants, but renamed to Adam and the Ants before its first gig.
- Adiemus – Creator Karl Jenkins invented the word, unaware at the time that it means "We will draw near" in Latin.
- Aerosmith – During a brainstorming session to come up with a name, drummer Joey Kramer brought up "Aerosmith", a word he had often written on his school notebooks, since he had recently been reminded of it by the cover art of Harry Nilsson's Aerial Ballet album, which included a drawing of a circus performer jumping out of a biplane. The other members at first rejected it, since they thought it came from Arrowsmith, a Sinclair Lewis novel they had had to read in school. They changed their minds when Kramer explained the spelling difference.
- Aiden – After a character from the 2002 film The Ring.
- Air Supply – Five years before the band's signing, Graham Russell saw the name in a dream.
- The Airborne Toxic Event – Named by leader Mikel Jollett after a section in Don DeLillo's novel White Noise in which a poisonous gas cloud results from a chemical spill from a train car. Jollett saw a similarity between the life-altering perspective shift in the novel's protagonist and the life-altering series of events that gave rise to the band, and the themes of mortality and media consumption resulting from the gas cloud in the novel are a source of inspiration for the band.
- AKB48 – After Tokyo's area Akihabara (colloquially shortened to Akiba), a mecca for electronics shopping and geeks. The group was formed as theater-based, to perform at its own theater at Akihabara on a daily basis, so that fans could always go and see them live. It still performs there every day, although, after the group's popularity went up, tickets started being distributed only via an online lottery.
- Alabama – Originally Young Country, then Wildcountry, their first label, seeing the band's value more as songwriters than performers, talked them into changing their name to The Alabama Band, later shortened to just Alabama.
- Alexisonfire – from contortionist stripper Alexis Fire, which nearly resulted in a lawsuit from the stripper's representatives.
- Alice Cooper – Alice Cooper was a band before frontman Vincent Furnier started a solo career under the same name. Allegedly, Alice Cooper was the name of a spirit members of the band came in contact with through a ouija, though Furnier has also claimed that he wanted their name to contrast with their sound, and Alice Cooper sounds like somebody's grandmother.
- Alice in Chains – The name was taken from lead singer Layne Staley's previous group, the glam metal band Alice N' Chains. Staley shed some light on the subject in a Rolling Stone article in 1992: "The name came from a side project of my old group [Alice N' Chains]. We were going to have this band that dressed up in drag and played heavy metal as a joke." Alice N' Chains' bassist Johnny Bacolas explained the name in the 2011 book Everybody Loves Our Town: A History of Grunge. Bacolas and Russ Klatt (the lead singer of Slaughter Haus 5) were at a party in North Seattle talking about backstage passes. One of the passes said "Welcome to Wonderland", and they started talking about that being an Alice in Wonderland-type thing, until Klatt started saying, "What about Alice in Chains? Put her in bondage and stuff like that." Bacolas thought the name "Alice in Chains" was cool and brought it up to his Sleze bandmates and everyone liked it, so they changed the name of the band. Since three of the members had very Christian mothers, they thought spelling it "Alice N' Chains" made it not sound a bondage name. After Staley left Alice N' Chains, he contacted his former bandmates and asked for permission to use the name with his new band with guitarist Jerry Cantrell.
- Alien Ant Farm – Bassist Terry Corso said the name was a day dream he had about how Earth is just an experiment for aliens from other planets.
- The All-American Rejects – The "All-Americans" and "the Rejects", both suggested to the band as names, were merged.
- All Shall Perish – The band's name was created by original drummer Matt Kuykendall, representing the band's focus on dark, nihilistic themes like dejection, social struggle, and death.
- All Time Low – When in high school, members Alex Gaskarth, Jack Barakat, Rian Dawson, and Zack Merrick made a list of possible band names, one of which being "All Time Low". The name came from New Found Glory's song "Head On Collision".
- Alphaville – From the film by Jean-Luc Godard.
- Alter Bridge – The band is named after a bridge near Mark Tremonti's home on Alter road in Detroit.
- Alt-J – The spoken form of the band ∆, alt + j is the keyboard shortcut used to type ∆ on a Mac computer. ∆ is a mathematical symbol for change.
- AM Conspiracy – The band got its name from vocalist Jason Jones' experience listening to late-night A.M. radio in California, where he heard shows about conspiracy theories about UFOs, (like Art Bell's) while driving, leading him to combine "A.M." with "Conspiracy" for the name.
- The Amboy Dukes – From the 1947 novel by Irving Shulman.
- Ambrosia – After performing for a while as Ambergris Mite, the band learned there was another band already named Ambergris. They looked in a dictionary and found the similar-sounding "ambrosia", which they liked as it meant "nectar of the gods".
- America — The founders, all sons of U.S. military personnel stationed in the U.K. at the time, took the name from an "Americana" jukebox at the mess hall for US personnel at RAF South Ruislip, to avoid the perception that they were British musicians trying to sound American.
- Amon Amarth – Named after "Mount Doom", in Tolkien's Elvish speech.
- Anamanaguchi – The name came about from a member in one of Peter Berkman's former bands pronouncing gibberish in the style of Jabba the Hutt; The band has also explained it as coming from the members' internships at Armani (Berkman and James DeVito), Prada (Ary Warnaar), and Gucci (Luke Silas) while studying fashion at Parsons School of Design.
- Anberlin – Band member Stephen Christian has offered the explanations that he planned naming his first daughter Anberlin and that the name was a modification of the phrase "and Berlin" from a list of cities Christian wanted to visit. The one story that Christian asserts is true, however, is that he heard the word in the background noise of the Radiohead song "Everything in Its Right Place".
- ...And You Will Know Us by the Trail of Dead – Initially claimed to be a line in a Mayan ritual chant, though lead singer Conrad Keely has since admitted the story was a joke.
- The Animals – There are several different accounts of how the band, originally the Alan Price Combo, got its name. In their early years it was reported to have been a nickname inspired by their rowdy stage performances. But in 2013, singer Eric Burdon said that it was in fact a tribute to a friend of his nicknamed "Animal". Eight years later, drummer John Steel, credited Graham Bond with having given the band its name.
- Animals as Leaders – Inspired by the 1992 novel Ishmael by Daniel Quinn, guitarist Tosin Abasi coined the name as a reminder that "we're all essentially animals". Abasi went into further depth by saying, "The name is kind of like, a lot of what we do is completely removed from the fact that we're all essentially animals. We have a niche on the planet and we have a role in sustainable sort of ecology. But we've gone against our natural calling. The name is acknowledging that we do have more of a natural role on the planet. It's also like, who would follow an animal to do anything? I think of the name as being both nonsensical and really literal."
- Anthrax – Scott Ian saw the name of the disease in a biology textbook and suggested it. The members liked that it sounded "sufficiently evil"
- Apollo 440 – From the Greek god Apollo and the frequency of concert pitch–the A note at 440 Hz, often denoted as "A440", and the Sequential Circuits sampler/sequencer, the Studio 440.
- Apulanta – Means "fertiliser" in Finnish. Invented as a joke when the band had to come up with a "punk" sounding name.
- Aquarium – While it is popularly believed that the name came from a Leningrad pub where the members had met and begun performing, Boris Grebenshchikov has said it came from either word association or a glass-sided building in the area.
- Arcade Fire – Based on a story that singer Win Butler heard as a kid. He was told that an arcade in Exeter had burnt down, killing many youths.
- Armored Saint – Drummer Gonzo Sandoval says he came up with the name after watching a showing of Excalibur in a movie theater parking lot.
- Arsonists Get All the Girls – The experimental deathcore band originally formed in Santa Cruz, California under the joke name eS eN eE eS (a stylized nod to the Super Nintendo Entertainment System). Their distinct, long-winded moniker was coined by the band's late founding bassist, Patrick Mason, who randomly came up with the phrase "Arsonists Get All the Girls" while simply sitting alone in his bedroom. Rather than carrying a deep or serious meaning, the name was chosen to match the group's tongue-in-cheek humor and eccentric personality, which they frequently highlighted throughout their career using bizarre song titles and unconventional musical transitions.
- Art of Noise – After the 1913 manifesto called The Art of Noises by Italian Futurist Luigi Russolo.
- Die Ärzte – Decided when the band noticed that the folder with the umlaut "Ä" was empty in most record stores. The band often stylises their name, which is grammatically correct German, with three dots in the umlaut in the letter "Ä", as a parody of the heavy metal umlaut. No language using the Latin alphabet has a three-dot diacritic.
- As I Lay Dying – After the 1930 novel As I Lay Dying by William Faulkner.
- Ash – The band chose the first short word they liked in the dictionary, as stated in the CD booklet of Intergalactic Sonic 7"s.
- Asking Alexandria – Named after guitarist Ben Bruce's previous project, formed in Dubai. Bruce chose the name Alexandria in reference to Alexander the Great, and because he believed that a person's name increased relatability.
- The Association – Suggested by Terry Kirkman's fiancée.
- At the Gates – The pioneering Swedish melodic death metal group originally went by a much longer moniker. For about a week in 1990, the Gothenburg group was called "The Dwellers at the Gates of Silent Memory" before deciding to shorten it to At The Gates.
- Atreyu – After a character in 1979 novel The NeverEnding Story and the 1984 movie of the same name.
- Audioslave – According to lead guitarist Tom Morello, the name supposedly came to singer Chris Cornell in a vision.
- Automatic Pilot – From psychiatric testimony characterizing Dan White's state of mind while killing George Moscone and Harvey Milk.
- The Avalanches – Taken from the 1960s surf rock band of the same name.
- Avenged Sevenfold – Taken from the Book of Genesis, from the passage "If Cain shall be avenged sevenfold, Truly Lamech seventy and sevenfold."
- Average White Band – A friend who heard them performing remarked "This is too much for the average white man".
- Avicii – Stage name of Tim Bergling; he explained that the name Avicii means "the lowest level of Buddhist hell" (Avīci) and he chose the moniker because his real name was already used upon creating his Myspace page.
- Awolnation – The name is derived from leader Aaron Bruno's high school nickname. In an interview with Kristin Houser of the LA Music Blog, he stated that he "would leave without saying goodbye" because it was just easier, so that's where the name AWOL (slang from the military acronym for Absent Without Leave) came from."
- Iggy Azalea – Amethyst Amelia Kelly combined the name of a dog she had as a child with the street her family lives on for her stage name.

== B ==
- The B-52's – From the name of a beehive hairstyle, itself named for the Boeing B-52 Stratofortress.
- Babymetal – According to Kobametal (the band's producer), the name came to him by revelation (as a "divine message"). It is a play on the words "heavy metal".
- Bachman–Turner Overdrive – A combination of band members' last names and the magazine Overdrive. The band's name had previously been "Bachman-Turner". All band members agreed that Bachman-Turner Overdrive sounded cooler.
- Backstreet Boys – After a flea market in Orlando, Florida.
- Bad Boys Blue – Bad Boys Blue was formed in 1984 in Cologne, Germany, by producer Tony Hendrik and lyricist Karin van Haaren, who aimed to create a rebellious, stylish pop group to rival Modern Talking. The name "Bad Boys" was chosen to appeal to young, rebellious audiences, while "Blue" was added to complete the image.
- Bad Bunny – From a time when he was forced to wear a bunny costume and was annoyed about it. He later thought the name "Bad Bunny" would "market well".
- Bad Company – While it is often assumed that the band took its name from the 1972 film, it actually comes from a Victorian book of morals for children that captioned one illustration "beware of bad company".
- Bad Religion – Bad Religion's Greg Graffin on their name:

You have to remember that we were fifteen-year-old punks–we wanted to piss people off. Anything that might make parents, teachers, and people with authority bristle was up for discussion. We also wanted a name that would suggest a great logo for stickers and T-shirts. Many of the names were compelling but too repulsive. Smegma, Vaginal Discharge, and Head Cheese might make for great logos but were quickly rejected as not representative of our songs. We played around with a lot of names involving the word "bad"–Bad Family Planning, Bad Politics. When we hot [sic] on Bad Religion, it seemed perfect. That year, 1980, was a time of rising prominence for televangelists like Jimmy Swaggart, Pat Robertson, and Jim Bakker. The year before, Jerry Falwell had founded the Moral Majority, which was having a powerful influence on the presidential election between Jimmy Carter and Ronald Reagan. Religion was a hot topic, and those TV preachers seemed like a good target to us, though we didn't think they could possibly last for more than a few years. We knew that most people were so defensive about their religious ideas that they would be highly offended by our name–a major plus! And then Brett came up with a logo that represented our philosophical stance. We felt complete.

- Badding – After the children's literary character Paddington Bear.
- Badfinger – Originally called "The Iveys" after a street in Swansea, Wales. Once the band was signed to Apple Records by The Beatles the band took the opportunity to change their name. The name "Badfinger" was derived from "Bad Finger Boogie", the working title of The Beatles' "With a Little Help from My Friends".
- The Band – They were originally known as The Hawks, after their original lead singer Ronnie Hawkins. While working with Bob Dylan in the 1960s, they decided to change their name, but were unable to agree on a new name. They finally decided to simply call themselves "The Band" after being derisively referred to as "the band" by critics of Dylan's new electric direction on the 1966 tour.
- The Bangles – On the eve of releasing their first EP, The Bangs discovered another band had trademarked that name and would not let them use it for free, so they added the "-les" ending.
- Barenaked Ladies – Two members–Steven Page and Ed Robertson–were bored at a Bob Dylan concert and turned to amusing each other, pretending they were rock critics, inventing histories and comments about the Dylan band. They also made up various fictional band names, one of which was "Barenaked Ladies". On another front, Robertson had agreed to perform with his cover band in a battle of the bands at Nathan Phillips Square for the Second Harvest food bank. The band broke up and he forgot about the gig. When he received a phone call a week before the show, asking him to confirm the gig, he improvised that the name of the band had changed to "Barenaked Ladies", recalling the name from the Dylan concert. He then called Page and asked if he wanted to do the gig; Page reportedly could not believe Robertson had given that name.
- Basement Jaxx – The duo got their name in 1994, taking inspiration from both the subterranean location of their early studio and the energetic club nights they hosted. Felix Buxton and Simon Ratcliffe were producing early EPs in a basement in Brixton, London, and they chose the moniker to combine that physical studio setting with the "jack" or "jacking" style of Chicago house music they loved.
- Bastille – Lead singer Dan Smith was born on July 14, Bastille Day.
- Bat & Ryyd – Originally named Batman & Ryydman, but shortened to "Bat & Ryyd" after a complaint from composer Kari Rydman.
- Stiv Bators – The Dead Boys and Lords of the New Church singer-guitarist was born Steve Bator; "Stiv" is how his father Stephen Sr., a native Slovak speaker, pronounced the name. Later in his career he added the "s" to his last name.
- Bauhaus – Originally named "Bauhaus 1919" after the German Bauhaus art movement, and shortened to "Bauhaus" in 1979.
- Bay City Rollers – Scottish band the Rollers, cognizant that their American-inspired sound would need a name to match, threw a dart at a map of the U.S. to find a placename to add to it. After "Arkansas" was rejected, the second dart struck Bay City, Michigan, which met with unanimous approval.
- The Beach Boys — The band had decided they would write songs celebrating the Southern California lifestyle, but had not settled on a single name to perform under. At the time they recorded their first single, they were The Surfers, but upon its release they found themselves credited as The Beach Boys, since there already was another group known as the Surfers.
- The Beastie Boys – Founding member John Berry suggested the name; later the band came with the backronym ""Boys Entering Anarchistic States Towards Inner Excellence" for an interview with Charlie Rose.
- The Beatles – The Crickets were cited as an inspiration for the name. Additionally, the misspelling of "beetles" was a play on words, describing the "beat" of the band.
- The Beautiful South – Lead singer Paul Heaton explained at the time that the name was partly a sarcastic reflection of his own dislike of southern England, and partly an attempt to force macho men to utter the word 'beautiful'.
- Bee Gees – From "B.G.", the initials of all three of band member Barry Gibb, radio DJ Bill Gates and speedway promoter and driver Bill Goode. The similarity to "Brothers Gibb" is just a coincidence.
- Belle & Sebastian – From Belle et Sébastien, a children's book by French writer Cécile Aubry.
- Between the Buried and Me – The band name was derived from a phrase in Counting Crows' song "Ghost Train"
- Biffy Clyro – There are many rumours of the origin of Biffy Clyro's name. These are that, one time, lead singer Simon Neil bought a Cliff Richard pen, which was therefore a "Cliffy biro". They then changed this to Biffy Clyro. Another theory is that 'Biffy Clyro' were a Welsh tribe. The third rumour is that Biffy Clyro was a former player of the band's football team, Ayr United. They have never confirmed any of these.
- Big Country – The band settled on this when changing their name in their early days. Founder and lead singer Stuart Adamson liked the "sense of vastness, open spaces" it suggested.
- Big Drill Car – The band members have claimed in interviews that their name was inspired by the movie Journey to the Center of the Earth.
- Billy Talent – After a character in the film Hard Core Logo (although the name in the film and the book by Michael Turner it was adapted from is spelled "Billy Tallent").
- Jello Biafra — Eric Boucher took his stage name from the gelatin brand and the short-lived African state, currently part of Nigeria.
- Biohazard – The band Biohazard got their name from Type O Negative frontman Pete Steele, who suggested it, along with the band's iconic symbol. The name was chosen to reflect the band's lyrical focus on topics that are "harmful to life," such as social, personal, and urban situations that can ruin potential and well-being.
- The Birthday Massacre – The name of the band's early song. According to their vocalist Chibi: "It kind of works well for the music that we're making. Sort of contrasty, you know? Birthday, and massacre. Light, and dark. Cute, and evil." The band was originally known as Imagica, but adopted the current name to avoid confusion with another group. The song "The Birthday Massacre" was then renamed to "Happy Birthday".
- Bix – The name was developed after Saulius Urbonavičius released a single-copy underground album titled "BIX" with a classmate. It is derived from "bikas" (smoke), reflecting the raw, smoky atmosphere of their early post-punk/rock style.
- Black Country, New Road – Black Country, New Road found their name on a random Wikipedia generator.
- The Black Crowes – The group originally called themselves Mr. Crowe's Garden, after a favorite children's book. They performed under that name until they signed with Def American Records in 1989. They renamed themselves in response to the suggestion of a producer.
- Black Flag – Suggested by guitarist Greg Ginn's brother, Raymond Pettibone, because "if a white flag means surrender, a black flag means anarchy."
- The Black Keys – When the duo grew up in Akron, Ohio, a schizophrenic man residing in a halfway house used to call their homes to ask for crayons, Diet Coke and cigarettes. His messages would always end with him saying "...don't be a black key. Don't be a b-flat."
- Black Label Society – The band was named by guitarist Zakk Wylde as a reference to his favorite whisky, Johnnie Walker Black Label, which he considered "the best". Originally, the band was planned to be called "Hell's Kitchen," but that name could not be trademarked, leading to the adoption of the liquor-inspired name.
- Black Rebel Motorcycle Club – The film The Wild One featured two motorcycle gangs, the Beetles and Black Rebels Motorcycle Club. In a reference to the story that The Beatles took their name from one motorcycle gang, guitarist Peter Hayes and bassist Robert Levon Been originally named their band "The Other Gang", but switched to Black Rebel Motorcycle Club when The Other Gang did not catch on.
- Black Sabbath – Originally known as Earth, the group wanted to change their name as another group had the same name. The group saw a local cinema playing a film titled Black Sabbath and marvelled that people paid money to be frightened.
- Blackfoot – Guitarist Rickey Medlocke, whose father was a member of the Blackfoot American Indian tribe, suggested the band's name when they decided to change it to avoid confusion with another, similarly-named band. It recognizes not only his father's descent but the Native American heritage shared by all but one of the other band members.
- Blancmange — From the dessert.
- Bleeker – The band Bleeker (formerly Bleeker Ridge) derived their original name from the street names where the two sets of founding brothers lived in Orillia, Ontario: Bleeker Street (Taylor and Cole Perkins) and Ridge Avenue (Dan and Dustin Steinke). They later shortened the name to Bleeker following line-up changes.
- Blind Faith – Eric Clapton chose the name, reflecting the belief of everyone involved that the band would be successful no matter what they recorded and released.
- Blind Melon– Bass player Brad Smith's father used this term to refer to some hippies who lived in a commune near his house.
- Blink-182 – The "Blink" was thought up by Tom DeLonge when the band consisted of DeLonge, Mark Hoppus, and their friend Scott Raynor.(They previously called themselves Duck Tape.) An Irish band was already using the name Blink, so they added a random number to the end.
- Blondie – A nickname given to frontwoman Debbie Harry by truck drivers who catcalled "Hey, Blondie" to Harry as they drove by.
- Bloodhound Gang – The Bloodhound Gang took their name from a segment on the 1980s PBS children’s educational show 3-2-1 Contact. The segment featured a group of young detectives who solved mysteries using science and math. The band in 1988, originally named Bang Chamber 8, changed their name in 1992.
- Blue October – The front man of Blue October, Justin Furstenfeld, spent a brief stint in a mental hospital in October 1997. Furstenfeld stated that afterwards he wrote songs to keep depression away which led to the forming of the band.
- Blue Öyster Cult – The band had begun performing as Soft White Underbelly in the late 1960s. But after a 1969 Fillmore East concert was poorly reviewed, manager Sandy Pearlman decided the group should change its name if it wanted to get a record contract, and eventually settled on Blue Öyster Cult, taken from a group of aliens in Pearlman's poetry. The band, who initially disliked that moniker, was signed after Clive Davis, who had rejected one of their demos under their original name, liked another recorded under their new name. They would occasionally perform small club gigs as Soft White Underbelly for their first 20 years.
- Blur – Chosen by the members of what was up to then Seymour from a list of alternatives proposed by the label that had signed them, who liked their sound but not their name.
- Boards of Canada – Named in tribute to the National Film Board of Canada. The Scottish brothers spent part of their youth growing up in Canada, and credit the Film Board's documentaries as a source of inspiration for their sound.
- bob hund – From a cartoon dog named Bob that the band once saw on TV.
- Rachel Bolan – Skid Row's bassist and co-founder was born James Richard Southworth. He took his stage name by combining his brother's first name, Richard, with his grandfather's, Manuel. The last name is a tribute to the late T-Rex guitarist Marc Bolan. He legally became Rachel Bolan Southworth in 1990.
- Bon Iver – Suggested by an episode of Northern Exposure in which, after the first snow of winter, people greet each other with bon hiver (pronounced [bɔn‿ivɛʁ], French for "good winter"). This was initially transcribed by Vernon as "boniverre". When he learned of its proper French spelling, he elected not to use it, deciding "hiver" reminded him too much of liver; he had been bedridden with a liver ailment when he watched the show.
- Bon Jovi – An alternative spelling of Jon Bon Jovi's last name Bongiovi, following the example of the other famous two-word bands such as Van Halen, as suggested by Pamela Maher.
- Boney M – Frank Farian came up with the name from the Australian TV series Boney (TV series), and added the M because he liked the way it sounded.
- Bonzo Dog Doo-Dah Band – A combination of Bonzo the dog and the Dada art movement.
- The Boomtown Rats – As revealed in his autobiography, Bound for Glory, this was the name of Woody Guthrie's boyhood gang, named after his hometown, Oklahoma City, known as 'Boomtown' during the oil boom.
- Boston – After the city of Boston, Massachusetts, where the band was formed. The name was suggested by a producer and engineer working on the band's first album.
- La Bouche – The Eurodance group La Bouche (French for "The Mouth") got their name from producers who noticed lead singer Melanie Thornton’s large mouth and powerful vocal delivery while in the studio. Producer Frank Farian finalized the name, which translates to "the mouth" in French, to represent the essence of expression.
- Boyz II Men – Originally known as Unique Attraction, they were renamed after a song by New Edition.
- Brainerd – Original guitarist Knife named the band after his hometown, Brainerd, Minnesota.
- Bread – The members were walking down the street brainstorming a name, and considered several based on objects around them, when a bread truck passed by. "It began with a B, like the Beatles and the Bee Gees", David Gates explained later. "Bread also had a kind of universal appeal. It could be taken a number of ways. Of course, for the entire first year people called us the Breads."
- Breaking Benjamin – During a live performance, frontman Benjamin Burnley accidentally knocked a microphone over, causing it to crack once it hit the ground. The microphone's owner appeared on stage to say "I'd like to thank Benjamin for breaking my f*cking microphone."
- Breaking Point – The Memphis-based post-grunge band originally known as Broken (formed in 1999) changed their name to Breaking Point around 2000 to solidify their identity as they moved toward securing a major label deal. Founded by Brett Erickson and Justin Rimer, the band operated as Broken briefly, but likely adopted the more urgent and energetic moniker "Breaking Point" to reflect their "rocked out" style and to distinguish themselves from other bands with similar names, as they often recruited members and searched for a permanent identity in the intense Memphis music scene before releasing their debut demo. This name change occurred before signing with Wind-up Records, aiding their rise in popularity with radio hits like "27" and their work on the WWE Rob Van Dam theme song "One of a Kind".
- Bring Me the Horizon – From a line said by Captain Jack Sparrow in Pirates of the Caribbean: The Curse of the Black Pearl, "Now ... bring me that horizon".
- Brinsley Schwarz – From the band's guitarist.
- Britny Fox – From a 19th-century Welsh ancestor of frontman Dean Davidson.
- Budgie – Burke Shelley said the band chose the name (a British term for a parakeet) for the irony: "[We] loved the idea of playing noisy, heavy rock, but calling ourselves after something diametrically opposed to that".
- Buffalo Springfield – From a steamroller manufacturer.
- The Buggles — Geoff Downes originally called duo the Bugs: "imaginary creatures who lived in recording studios creating havoc". The "gles" was added after someone jokingly told them the band would never be as big as the Beatles. Bandmate Trevor Horn later said "I know the name's awful, but at the time it was the era of the great punk thing. I'd got fed up of producing people who were generally idiots but called themselves all sorts of clever names like the Unwanted, the Unwashed, the Unheard ... when it came to choosing our name I thought I'd pick the most disgusting name possible. In retrospect I have frequently regretted calling myself Buggles".
- Burzum – Means "darkness" in Tolkien's Black Speech.
- Bush – The band chose the name in reference to a district of West London named Shepherd's Bush where the founding members once lived.
- Butthole Surfers – The band, who previously changed their name at every gig, was performing an earlier version of 1984's "Butthole Surfer" when the announcer forgot the band's name and used the title of the song instead. They were forced to keep this name after the performance hit fame.
- Buzzcocks – The band took their name from a Time Out review of the 1976 T.V. show Rock Follies with the headline "It's the Buzz, Cock!" (Cock was slang for "mate".) The band members liked the subversiveness of it.
- The Byrds – At Thanksgiving dinner in 1964, the members of the band then known as the Jet Set unanimously decided to rename themselves The Byrds, both continuing the theme of flight and borrowing the deliberate misspelling that also characterized The Beatles' name.

== C ==
- Cabaret Voltaire – From the Zurich club where Dadaism began.
- Cage The Elephant – After one of their shows, a mentally ill man approached frontman Matt Shultz, hugged him and said "you have to cage the elephant".
- Cake – Rather than referring to the foodstuff, the name is meant to be "like when something insidiously becomes a part of your life...[we] mean it more as something that cakes onto your shoe and is just sort of there until you get rid of it".
- Can — Suggested by Malcolm Mooney for its positive connotations in several languages. After a British magazine reported it stood for "Communism, anarchism and nihilism", Jaki Liebezeit began making that claim as well.
- Eric Carr – After choosing Paul Caravello to replace Peter Criss on the drums, the other members of Kiss urged him to take a stage name as they all had. He decided to emulate Criss by, like him, having an anapestic name—two short syllables followed by a long one, the reverse of the dactyls the other members' stage names formed. He chose "Eric" from a list he and his girlfriend put together; "Carr" was a truncation of his last name, ending in the same two consonants as Criss's had.
- Cansei de Ser Sexy – Portuguese for "tired of being sexy", an alleged quote of Beyoncé Knowles, one of the largest musical influences upon this Brazilian band.
- Captain Beefheart — Don Van Vliet possibly derived his stage name from an uncle who would regularly expose himself to Don's girlfriend, urinating with the bathroom door open and saying "Doesn't that look like a giant beef heart?", turning towards her if she walked by while he was doing so.
- Captain Jack – The German Eurodance group Captain Jack (known for hits like "Captain Jack" and "Drill Instructor") adopted their name and military-themed persona to evoke a strict, high-energy, and disciplined persona, often featuring a frontman in a red uniform and beret. The name was chosen to reflect their, at the time, unique, dance-pop/hip-hop style.
- Carach Angren – From Tolkien's The Lord of the Rings, named after a pass in Mordor. (Carach Angren means "Iron Jaws" in Elvish.)
- Car Seat Headrest – Founder Will Toledo chose the name "Car Seat Headrest" as he would often record the vocals to his early albums in the back seat of his car for privacy.
- The Cars – Drummer David Robinson suggested the new name to the band, Cap'n Swing up to then, when he joined as part of a revamped lineup.
- C.C. Catch – C. C. Catch’s stage name was created by producer Dieter Bohlen in 1985 for singer Caroline Catharina Müller. The "C.C." stands for the initials of her first and middle names (Caroline Catharina), while "Catch" was chosen because it sounded good, was catchy, and paired well with the initials.
- C+C Music Factory – C+C Music Factory was formed in 1989 by American record producers Robert Clivillés and David Cole, with the "C+C" moniker directly derived from the first letters of their surnames. The duo added "Music Factory" to represent their vision of the group not as a traditional band, but as a collaborative, production-driven project—a "factory" designed to discover, develop, and showcase new or unknown vocal talent rather than relying on a static lineup. According to Clivillés, he and Cole acted as the driving force behind the scenes, creating a musical equation of "Rock + Soul + Funk + Pop + Techno" and utilizing various vocalists and rappers, such as Freedom Williams and Zelma Davis, to execute their dance-pop sound.
- C.C.C.P. – After SSSR, the Russian language abbreviation for the Soviet Union, which when written in the Cyrillic alphabet looks like it spells "CCCP".
- The Chainsmokers – Founding member Alex Pall explained it as follows: "At the time of conception it was, it was totally just like I was in college. You know I enjoyed smoking weed and you know it was just like such a 'yeah the domain's open'. I don't have to have any like underscores."
- Charli XCX – When playing at illegal warehouse parties, she needed a stage name and chose Charli XCX, which was her MSN Messenger screen name. The "XCX" stands for "kiss Charli kiss".
- Cheap Trick – Inspired by the band's attendance at a Slade concert, where bassist Tom Petersson commented that the band used "every cheap trick in the book" as part of their act.
- The Chemical Brothers – Originally the Dust Brothers until the US-based producers began legal action over their use of the name on their first US tour. The duo quickly changed their name, replacing "Dust" with "Chemical" after their song "Chemical Beats".
- Chicago – Founded as The Big Thing, the band released its first album as Chicago Transit Authority. It was truncated to just the city's name for the next release after the real Chicago Transit Authority threatened litigation.
- Childish Gambino – Donald Glover used a Wu-Tang Clan name generator in his sophomore year of college at NYU, inputting his real name and coming up with Childish Gambino.
- Children of Bodom – After being told by Spinefarm Records that the band's name had to change (the group having previously been signed to another label under the name Inearthed), the group looked through a local phone book to search for inspiration, coming across Lake Bodom. The band, like most of Finland, was already aware of the unsolved murder of three teenagers camping at the lake. The band believed they had found an impacting name with an interesting story behind it, and so chose the name Children of Bodom. Many of their songs have also been named after the murders, such as "Lake Bodom", "Silent Night, Bodom Night", "Children of Bodom" and "Bodom After Midnight".
- China Crisis – The English new wave band got their name during a casual brainstorming session in a local pub in Kirkby, Merseyside. While discussing potential exotic or politically charged monikers popular during the Cold War—with various friends throwing around ideas like "Russia In Winter" and "China East"—co-founder Gary Daly combined two of the suggestions, and the rest of the group agreed that "China Crisis" just stuck.
- Chevelle – Named after the car.
- The Chordettes – The female vocal quartet formed in Sheboygan, Wisconsin, in 1946, derived their name from their specialty in singing "chords" or, specifically, barbershop-style close harmony. The name was chosen to reflect this musical style, similar to how other terms of the era used suffixes for female counterparts, such as "bachelorettes" or "majorettes".
- The Church – Steve Kilbey's original name, The Church of Man, was truncated by the rest of the band.
- Chvrches – Pronounced "churches", the band decided on the spelling to distinguish themselves in internet searches.
- Circle Jerks – Drummer Lucky Lehrer disliked the original name of the Bedwetters, so Keith Morris looked in a slang dictionary where he found the term "circle jerk".
- Cirith Ungol – Named after the "Pass of the Spider" in Tolkien's The Lord of the Rings.
- The Clash – After two early names did not seem to be working, bassist Paul Simonon noted that the word "clash" was appearing in many newspaper headlines at the time and suggested it, to the unanimous approval of the other band members.
- Clean Bandit – Members Grace Chatto and Jack Patterson lived in Moscow for a while; their landlady referred to a friend of theirs using a Russian affectionate phrase meaning something like "utter rascal", while "Clean bandit" is a more literal translation.
- CocoRosie – The mother of the two singers nicknamed Bianca Casady "Coco" and Sierra Casady "Rosie" from which CocoRosie takes its name.
- Coldplay – They initially called themselves "Big Fat Noises", changing to "Starfish" for their debut live performance. A friend of the band thought about "Coldplay" as an option for his own group after finding a copy of Philip Horky's 1997 book Child's Reflections, Cold Play, but "Starfish" asked if they could use it instead. "Pectoralz" is often associated to Coldplay as well, being "a joke name for a boy band they created. It was never a name consideration for the 'real' band".
- Collective Soul – From a phrase in Ayn Rand's novel The Fountainhead. The band just liked it and did not intend to convey any philosophical statement through it.
- Commodores – Taken at random from a dictionary.
- The Communards – From the members of the 1871 Paris Commune.
- Conchita Wurst – From the German expression "das ist mir doch alles Wurst", meaning "it's all the same to me" and a Cuban friend of the artist's named Conchita. The artist has also explained that conchita is Spanish slang for vagina and Wurst is German slang for penis.
- Concrete Blonde – Michael Stipe suggested it to them as a metaphor for the contrast between their hard-rock sound and introspective lyrics.
- Confederate Railroad – The band took inspiration from a locomotive called "The General" for their name, which was overtaken in Georgia amid the Civil War. It is now an attraction in Kennesaw, Georgia, where Danny Shirley was living at the time of signing with a record label.
- Coriky – Named after Kuriki, a popular dice game in the Washington, D.C. hardcore scene.
- Elvis Costello – Early in his musical career, Declan MacNamus began using "Costello", a name his father had once performed under, as his surname when performing, as it was easier to remember and spell over the phone. He eventually dropped his first name in favor of "D.P.", an occasional family nickname. A few years later, when he signed his first record contract, his managers persuaded him to change it to Elvis, to get some attention.
- Clock DVA – Formed in 1978 in Sheffield, England, derived their name from the Nadsat slang in Anthony Burgess's dystopian novel A Clockwork Orange. Founder Adi Newton and bassist Steven "Judd" Turner combined "Clock" with "Dva" (the Russian word for "two") to signify "temporal deviation" and highlight their experimental art-punk vision.
- Couch – When guitarist Zach Blankstein had a concussion, they met to write and rehearse on his couch in the basement, with the lights off so as not to overstimulate him.
- Counting Crows – From the nursery rhyme "One for Sorrow", a way of interpreting the magpies or crows seen in a tree as predicting the near future. Lead singer Adam Duritz had heard it in the 1989 film Signs of Life; it is in turn featured in their song "A Murder of One", on their debut album.
- Crash Test Dummies – Suggested by a friend of the band's founders, a medical student, as a joke, and then kept.
- Crass – A reference to the line "The kids was just crass" in David Bowie's song "Ziggy Stardust".
- Cream – Members Eric Clapton, Ginger Baker and Jack Bruce were considered among the "cream of the crop" of British jazz and blues-influenced musicians at the time they formed the band.
- Creed – Originally known as Naked Toddler for only one week, the band changed its name to "Creed" at bassist Brian Marshall's suggestion, after a band he had previously played for called Mattox Creed.
- Creedence Clearwater Revival – The band took the three elements from, firstly, Tom Fogerty's friend Credence Newball (to whose first name Credence they added an extra 'e', making it resemble a faith or creed); secondly, "clear water" from a TV commercial for Olympia beer; and finally "revival", which spoke to the four members' renewed commitment to their band.
- Crossfade – The band got their name in 2002 as a more marketable, professional alternative to their previous name, "Sugardaddy Superstar". The term refers to a, musical/production technique where one sound fades out while another fades in, representing a "merging of souls" or a blend of styles.
- Crossfaith –The name origin of the Japanese electronicore and metalcore band stems from the literal fusion of the words "cross" and "faith". Rather than carrying a religious connotation, the moniker represents the convergence of different musical styles, genres, thoughts, and backgrounds
- Crush 40 – Lead singer Johnny Gioeli explained to Gareth Spriggs (aka Fastest Thing Alive) at Summer of Sonic '10 that he never wanted to turn 40 years old, hence the name Crush 40, because he wanted to "Crush 40". The name is also a reference to Crush soda, guitarist Jun Senoue's favorite brand of soft drink.
- The Cult – Originally Southern Death Cult after a cluster of 14th-century Native American groups in what is now the Southwestern United States (now the Southeastern Ceremonial Complex), but also with the double meaning of critiquing the concentration of political, economic, social and cultural power in the south of England. Later, they truncated it to just the Cult to broaden their appeal from their original goth base.
- The Cure – The band's original name was Easy Cure, which was taken from the name of one of the group's early songs. The name was later shortened to The Cure because frontman Robert Smith felt the name was too American and "too hippyish".
- °C-ute (Cute) – The Japanese girl group was named by its producer Tsunku. According to him and the band's official website, the English word cute means "(little and) lovely, pretty". Wanting to somehow express the girls' overflowing fervor (enthusiasm), he substituted "°C" for "C".

== D ==
- Daft Punk – In 1992, being heavily influenced by The Beach Boys, they recorded songs under the name Darlin', which was a Beach Boys single from their 1967 album Wild Honey. A negative review in the UK's Melody Maker described their effort as "a daft punky thrash", which depressed the pair but unwittingly gave them a name for their next project.
- Damageplan – The band chose its name to represent a tactical and aggressive "plan of attack" for the Abbott brothers, Dimebag Darrell and Vinnie Paul, as they re-entered the music scene following the bitter dissolution of Pantera. Originally forming under the working title "New-Found Power", a phrase that served as the group's mantra for finding the strength to move on from their previous legacy—the members eventually decided that "Damageplan" better encapsulated their "no boundaries" approach to songwriting and their intent to expand their musical capabilities to their fullest. The name shift occurred just before the release of their 2004 debut album, leading them to repurpose New-Found Power as the album's title instead
- Damn Yankees – musician Ted Nugent coined the moniker during a 1989 brainstorming session for the new supergroup, which also included Jack Blades (from Night Ranger) and Tommy Shaw (from Styx). According to Nugent, the name was chosen on the spot when the group was discussing what to call themselves, to which he replied: "Well, we're a bunch of damn Yankees, let's call it that!".
- Danny – Chosen intentionally at the start of the artist's career. The name "Danny" is an acronym of a certain phrase, but according to an interview with Tuulia magazine, Danny will only reveal this phrase after retiring.
- Danny Wilson – Chosen at the last minute after problems with their initial band name Spencer Tracy due to issues with the dead actor's estate, who threatened to sue their record label Virgin Records if they went ahead and released their debut album in the states under that name. Instead the brothers in the band Gary Clark and Kit Clark chose the titular character from the film Meet Danny Wilson as that was played by Frank Sinatra who was a favourite artist of their father.
- The Darling Buds – From the H.E. Bates novel The Darling Buds of May, which in turn takes its title from William Shakespeare's Sonnet 18: "Rough winds do shake the darling buds of May".
- Darude – After the song "Rude Boy" by Swedish artist Leila K which he played a lot at a classmate's party, gradually morphed first into "Da Rude" and then "Darude".
- Darwin's Waiting Room – The name of the American nu metal band originated as a regional colloquialism for the American South, specifically referencing the band's home region of Miami, Florida. According to the band members, the phrase "Darwin's Waiting Room" was a pre-existing nickname for the South, playing on Charles Darwin's theories of evolution by humorously implying that the region was a place where people were "waiting" to evolve. Although the band recognized that it was a long, clunky name that did not easily roll off the tongue like their contemporary peers, they chose it because it directly connected to their geographical roots..
- Dashboard Confessional – Derived from the line in the band's song "The Sharp Hint of New Tears" which is "on the way home, this car hears my confessions/I think tonight I'll take the long way home...".
- David Bowie – From the artist's real first name David and the surname of the 19th-century American pioneer James Bowie and the knife he had popularised.
- DAY6 – The name was given to the band with an original 6 members representing Monday through Saturday, and the fans representing Sunday.
- A Day to Remember – A former member's ex-girlfriend used the term during a practice and the name stuck.
- Deacon Blue – Named after the Steely Dan song Deacon Blues.
- Deadsy – The band got their name from an experimental animated short film about a dead child, which was featured in Spike and Mike's Twisted Film Festival. Lollipop Magazine The band, formed in 1995 by Elijah Blue Allman, incorporates this dark, thematic influence into their unique blend of industrial, metal, and 80s synth-rock music.
- Dead Kennedys – The name was not meant to insult the assassinated Kennedy brothers, but to quote vocalist Jello Biafra, "to bring attention to the end of the American Dream".
- The Dead Milkmen – According to the band's official website, band member Joe Genaro said that the name "actually existed before the band was a reality". He created the name in high school for a creative writing project, based on the main character of the Toni Morrison novel Song of Solomon. The character, Macon Dead III, was nicknamed "Milkman" Dead.
- Deadmau5 – When his computer crashed and emitted a strange odor, Joel Thomas Zimmerman dismantled it and found a dead mouse inside. He later used the name as a username for various chatrooms.
- The Decemberists – The name refers to the Decembrist revolt, an 1825 revolt in Imperial Russia that Colin Meloy views as an attempted communist revolution.
- Death – The death metal band Death was formed in 1983 by Chuck Schuldiner in Florida, originally under the name Mantas. In 1984, Schuldiner changed the band's name to Death to transform the personal tragedy of his brother's death into a positive, creative outlet. It was intended to reflect an extreme name for extreme music.
- Deep Purple – It was inspired by the song "Deep Purple" from Mitchell Parish. According to the band, it was one of guitarist Ritchie Blackmore's grandmother's favourite songs.
- Def Leppard – Joe Elliott had, while in school, designed logos and written concert reviews for a then-fictional band called "Deaf Leopard" as part of his classes. After he proposed it as the name for his real band, then-drummer Tony Kenning suggested the altered spelling so no one would think they were a punk band.
- Deftones – Created by lead guitarist Stephen Carpenter, who wanted to pick "something that would just stand out but you know, not be all cheese-ball at the same time". Carpenter combined the hip hop slang term "def", which was used by artists such as LL Cool J and Public Enemy, with the suffix "-tones", which was a popular suffix among 1950s bands (e.g., Dick Dale and the Del-Tones, The Quin-Tones, The Monotones, The Cleftones, and The Harptones). Carpenter said the name is intentionally vague to reflect the band's tendency to not focus on just one style of music.
- Lana Del Rey — Elizabeth Woolridge Grant combined the name of actress Lana Turner with the Ford Del Rey automobile sold in Latin America during the 1980s to create her stage name. "I wanted a name I could shape the music towards." she explained later. "I was going to Miami quite a lot at the time, speaking a lot of Spanish with my friends from Cuba—Lana Del Rey reminded us of the glamour of the seaside. It sounded gorgeous coming off the tip of the tongue." For a brief time early in her career she spelled it Lana Del Ray.
- John Denver – Born John Deutschendorf, he took the shorter "Denver" as his last name for performing purposes after New Christy Minstrels' founder Randy Sparks told him his birth name might not fit on a marquee.
- Depeche Mode – After a French fashion magazine, Dépêche Mode (literally "Fashion Dispatch").
- Der Plan – Inspired by a quote from a book by British author Gordon Rattray Taylor called The Biological Timebomb, in which he describes the ability to make a plan as what distinguishes human beings from animals.
- The Devil Wears Prada – After the novel and comedy/drama movie of the same name.
- Devo – Inspired "from [the band's] concept of 'de-evolution'–the idea that instead of continuing to evolve, mankind has actually begun to regress, as evidenced by the dysfunction and herd mentality of American society."
- Dexys Midnight Runners – From the stimulant Dexedrine.
- Buck Dharma – Blue Öyster Cult's manager, Sandy Pearlman, gave stage names to all the members when he came up with the band's new name after they decided to abandon Soft White Underbelly. This one, given to guitarist Donald Roeser, is the only one to have stuck.
- The Dillinger Escape Plan – The American mathcore band got their name in 1997 after transitioning from their original moniker Arcane, and finding themselves booked for a concert without an official name. Needing something to put on promotional flyers, a close friend of the band, Matt Makowski, suggested "The Dillinger Escape Plan" while watching a television documentary about John Dillinger, a notorious 1930s bank robber famous for his multiple, daring prison escapes. Though the band members originally threw the name together almost as a joke and did not intend for it to be permanent, it ultimately stuck because it felt original and perfectly captured the frantic, aggressive "shoot-your-way-out" attitude of their complex musical style.
- Dio – Named for vocalist Ronnie James Dio, because his name was already well known at that time.
- Dire Straits – Comes from the band's financial situation at the time of forming.
- The Dirty Heads – The band's name comes from an occasion where Jared "Dirty J" Watson and vocalist/guitarist Dustin "Duddy B" Bushnell were stealing a 12-pack of beer, and someone shouted at them "Come here you little dirty heads!"
- Dirty Rotten Imbeciles – The band D.R.I. got their name from a frustrated parent. Formed in Houston in 1982 by Kurt Brecht and Spike Cassidy, the group practiced at Brecht's family home. Their loud, 120 decibel hardcore punk rehearsals frequently drew noise complaints from the brothers' father, who would interrupt their playing and angrily berate the musicians, calling them a "bunch of dirty rotten imbeciles."
- Discharge – Discharge, formed in 1977 in Stoke-on-Trent, took their name as a reflection of the raw, abrasive, and high-energy style of punk they aimed to play, often associated with, and later defining, the "D-beat" subgenre. The band name represents a visceral, chaotic sound that influenced hardcore, thrash metal, and crust punk.
- Disco Biscuits - During the first years of the band, they went under different names at every show. They soon decided to settle on a permanent name, and while driving to the Jersey Shore for a party, a friend said, "Hey, you guys wanna go find some Disco Biscuits?", referring to quaaludes.
- The Dismemberment Plan – According to lead singer Travis Morrison, this Washington, DC band's name was inspired by part of a line in the movie Groundhog Day, in which "[t]here's a guy who chases after Bill Murray and tries to keep selling him different types of insurance and 'the dismemberment plan' was one of them. It just stuck."
- Disturbed – Originally known as "Brawl", the band's name was suggested by frontman David Draiman, in an interview he explained: "It had been a name I have been contemplating for a band for years. It just seems to symbolize everything we were feeling at the time".
- The Dixie Cups – The 1960s girl group, The Dixie Cups (known for "Chapel of Love"), received their name just before their first release in 1964. Originally named "The Meltones" and later nicknamed "Little Miss and the Muffets," their producer/manager changed it to The Dixie Cups to sound more memorable and catchy shortly before signing with Red Bird Records.
- Dizzee Rascal – Dylan Mills got his stage name from a combination of a school nickname and his early musical persona. Teachers frequently called him a "rascal" due to his rebellious behavior and multiple expulsions, while "Dizzee" was a nickname he adopted during his early days as a DJ.
- DNCE – Pronounced "dance", which member JinJoo Lee said "is not a perfect word, but you don't have to be a perfect dancer to dance in life."
- Dr. Hook – George Cummings came up with the name, inspired by how Ray Sawyer's eyepatch evoked Captain Hook from Peter Pan. Fans sometimes thought Sawyer was Dr. Hook; when asked who that was, the band would all point to their tour bus driver if he was around.
- Don Johnson Big Band – Named after the actor Don Johnson in the series Miami Vice. The band had to come up with a name to reserve a place for training, so the name "Don Johnson Big Band" was invented spontaneously on the spot. The band is not a big band and bears little relation to Don Johnson.
- The Doobie Brothers – The name was suggested to the band's early members by a friend, in reference to their heavy marijuana use at the time.
- The Doors– Allusion to Aldous Huxley's book The Doors of Perception, whose title is taken from William Blake: "When the doors of perception are cleansed, things will appear to man as they truly are... infinite."
- Double Dagger – The band, founded by two graphic designers, took their name from the typographic symbol ‡, commonly used for footnotes and citations.
- Dream Syndicate — Dennis Duck suggested the lesser-used name for La Monte Young's 1960s experimental ensemble Theatre of Eternal Music.
- Dream Theater – After a movie house in Monterey, California. The name was suggested by drummer Mike Portnoy's father, who lived in Monterey.
- Dropkick Murphys – After wrestler and alcoholic rehabilitation facility operator John "Dropkick" Murphy.
- Drowning Pool – The band's name is based on the 1975 movie and novel of the same name.
- Drummer – The band is made up of members that are or were drummers of other bands.
- Duran Duran – Dr. Durand-Durand is the name of a character in the cult science fiction film Barbarella. The band played at Birmingham's Barberella's nightclub.

== E ==
- E Street Band – Bruce Springsteen's band was named after E Street (E, not East) in Belmar, New Jersey, because the band used to practice at the E Street home of pianist David Sancious's mother.
- E.Town Concrete – the New Jersey-based rap-metal/hardcore band formed in 1995, derived their name as a direct reference to their hometown of Elizabeth, New Jersey ("E-Town") and a desire for a "corny" or tough-sounding name that stuck. The name, initially chosen, represents their roots and the gritty, urban, or concrete environment of that area.
- Eagles – Accounts vary as to how the band got its name (which Glenn Frey insisted never included "the"). Most focus on an early group trip to the Mojave Desert where copious peyote and tequila were consumed. JD Souther says that during the outing, Frey shouted out "Eagles!" in response to suggestions for a name when he saw some flying above. But Don Felder, not on that trip because he was not yet in the band, says that it came from a later suggestion by Bernie Leadon after he read of the Hopi Native American nation's reverence for the birds. Comedian Steve Martin, a friend of the band from that era onwards, says it was his suggestion to them.
- Earth, Wind & Fire – Frontman Maurice White's astrological sign is Sagittarius, which has a primary elemental quality of fire and seasonal qualities of earth and air.
- The Eastern Dark – The 1980s Australian rock band took their name from a locale in the Phantom comics (referred to as Darcan or Darca in later strips) which was home to a multitude of evil and criminal enterprises. The Phantom is known, among his many names, as Guardian of the Eastern Dark.
- Eazy-E – Born as Eric Lynn Wright, the rapper known as Eazy-E adopted his iconic stage name from a combination of a childhood nickname and a reflection of his personality. Various sources indicate that his moniker originated from "Eazy-Eric," a name referencing his laid-back demeanor and approach to both life and business. The "E" part is a direct nod to his first name, Eric, while the spelling of "Eazy" with a 'z' was a stylistic choice that added an edge to his persona. Some speculation suggests he was initially known by the street nickname "Casual" due to his style and demeanor, which later evolved into "Eazy-E" as he became the founder of Ruthless Records
- Ebn Ozn — From founders Ned Liben and Robert Rosen's stage names.
- Echo & the Bunnymen – Came from a friend of the band who was constantly proposing "stupid" names, according to guitarist Will Sergeant. The band has denied reports that "Echo" referred to the drum machine that was an early component of their sound.
- Eiffel 65 – A computer chose the name Eiffel randomly from a group of words the three liked. The number 65 was added mistakenly to an early pressing of their first single, "Blue (Da Ba Dee)".
- ELO – Electric Light Orchestra is an intended pun based not only on electric light (as in a light bulb as seen on early album covers) but also using "electric" rock instruments combined with a "light orchestra" (orchestras with only a few cellos and violins that were popular in Britain during the 1960s).
- Elton John – Elton John, born as Reginald Kenneth Dwight, created his stage name around 1967–1968 by combining the first name of saxophonist Elton Dean and the middle/first name of singer Long John Baldry. Both musicians were his bandmates in the blues band Bluesology. He legally changed his name to Elton Hercules John in 1972.
- Elvis Hitler – A combination of American rockabilly singer Elvis Presley and Austrian-German politician Adolf Hitler.
- Eminem – Marshall Mathers began performing under the stage name "M&M", from his initials and the candy; eventually he started using the spelled-out version.
- Engelbert Humperdinck – Named after the real-life late 19th and early 20th century German composer Engelbert Humperdinck.
- England Dan – Dan Seals got that nickname from his older brother Jim due to his habit, as a Beatles fan in high school, of sometimes speaking in an assumed British accent.
- Enya – At the beginning of her solo career, Irish singer Eithne Ní Bhraonáin's manager, Nicky Ryan, suggested she use just a more phonetic version of her first name since it was likely to be mispronounced by listeners unfamiliar with Irish Gaelic. She is credited as Enya Ní Bhraonáin for her backing vocals and arranging work on Christy Moore's 1983 album Ordinary Man.
- Eppu Normaali – After the character Abby Normal in the Mel Brooks movie Young Frankenstein, but renamed as a Finnish name, keeping the original pun ("Eppu Normaali" sounds like "epänormaali", Finnish for "abnormal").
- E-Rotic – The German Eurodance group E-Rotic, formed in 1994 by producer David Brandes, was named to directly reflect the theme of their music. The name is a play on the word "erotic," highlighting the group's signature style of blending high-energy dance beats with suggestive, sexual innuendo-laden lyrics and themes.
- Eurythmics – After Dalcroze eurhythmics, a pedagogical exercise system that founding member Annie Lennox had encountered as a child.
- Evanescence – When asked where they got their name, they responded, "The dictionary." The word "evanescence" means "a disappearance or dissipation, like vapor". They apparently disliked their previous name and wanted something better. They also wanted to do some artwork (with whatever name they chose) and decided to look under E. They liked the word and definition, likening it to the temporary nature of life.
- Evergreen Terrace – Named after 742 Evergreen Terrace, the address of the Simpsons.
- Everything but the Girl – From the slogan used by the Hull shop Turner's Furniture on Beverley Road, which claimed "for your bedroom needs, we sell everything but the girl."
- Everything Everything – Derived either from the first two lines of the Radiohead song "Everything In Its Right Place", or from Karl Hyde's "everything, everything" vocal loop in the Underworld song Cowgirl.
- Exit Ten – After the motorway junction of the M4 to Reading, the band's "home".
- Explosions in the Sky – After leaving a performance on KVRX on July 4, 1999, when the band was still operating under the name Breaker Morant, drummer Chris Hravsky compared the fireworks outside to explosions in the sky.
- Extreme – Extreme was formed in Boston, Massachusetts, in 1985. Vocalist Gary Cherone and drummer Paul Geary had previously been members of a band called The Dream. Guitarist Nuno Bettencourt was in a band called Sinful, and bassist Pat Badger was playing with a Berklee College-based act called In The Pink. Bettencourt joined up with Cherone and Geary in a new group in 1985, followed by Badger in 1986. The name "Extreme" is a reference to Cherone and Geary's former band, being a homophone of "ex-Dream".
- Extreme Noise Terror – The British crust and grindcore band got its name from an insert found in an album by the Dutch hardcore punk band Lärm. According to guitarist Pete Hurley, the insert featured an illustration of a "hardcore kid" wearing a bandana with the words "Extreme Noise Terror" surrounding him. The founding members felt those three specific words perfectly captured the aggressive, chaotic, and politically charged sound they were aiming to create as they transitioned from their previous project, Raw Noise.

== F ==
- Faith No More – Mike Morris, cofounder of the predecessor band Sharp Young Men, had suggested a later change to Faith in No Man, later shortened by drummer Mike Bordin to Faith. No Man. Bordin and two others later broke from Morris to form their own band and changed it to Faith No More to reflect his absence.
- Falco – Johann Hölzel took his stage name from East German ski jumper Falko Weißpflog.
- The Fall – From the 1956 novel by Albert Camus.
- The Fall of Troy – The band reportedly picked their name by "opening a history textbook and pointing at a random location until [they] found a selection they liked".
- Fall Out Boy – Nameless for their first two shows as a band, at the end of their second show they asked the audience to yell out their ideas for a name. One audience member suggested "Fallout Boy", a reference to the sidekick of comic book superhero Radioactive Man from The Simpsons.
- Fantômas – The experimental metal band Fantômas, formed by Mike Patton in 1998, is named after a fictional French supervillain and master criminal from a series of early 20th-century novels and films. The character, known as the "Lord of Terror," was chosen to reflect the band's chaotic, intense, and often avant-garde musical style, which is often likened to a soundtrack for a comic book.
- The Farm – Originally thought to be named in tribute to Cantril Farm, a former council estate in Liverpool now known as Stockbridge Village, until frontman Peter Hooton confirmed that it was actually named after a farm outside Maghull where the band used to rehearse.
- Fastball – Originally called "Magneto" until learning of a Mexican boy band of the same name, they first attempted to use the name "Magneto USA", but were ultimately advised against it. The band eventually settled on "Fastball" in reference to a "baseball-themed porn movie".
- Fatboy Slim – According to the artist: "It doesn't mean anything. I've told so many different lies over the years about it I can't actually remember the truth. It's just an oxymoron—a word that can't exist. It kind of suits me—it's kind of goofy and ironic."
- Fear Factory – The band formed in 1989 under the name "Ulceration", which the band agreed would "just be a cool name". In 1990, the name "Fear the Factory" was adopted. The article "The" was dropped the same year. The moniker was inspired by a factory that the band supposedly saw near their rehearsal space which was guarded by men carrying rifles.
- Fearless Iranians from Hell – Fearless Iranians from Hell chose their moniker as a provocative satirical response to the intense anti-Iranian sentiment and "terrorist" stereotypes prevalent in the United States following the 1979 Iranian Revolution. Formed in San Antonio, Texas, the band which included members of Iranian descent used the name and a masked "extremist" persona to mock American media's demonization of the Middle East by roleplaying as the very "villains" the public feared. By adopting such an inflammatory title and lyrics, they created a dark, crossover thrash caricature intended to highlight the absurdity of xenophobia and political hysteria during the 1980s.
- Felt – Bandleader Lawrence is a fan of the group Television, and chose the name in homage to how Tom Verlaine emphasises the word in the song "Venus".
- FIDLAR – While helping two of his friends from Hawaii find a home in Los Angeles, frontman Zac Carper overheard the pair repeating the skater mantra "FIDLAR". When Carper asked what FIDLAR meant, he was told that it was an acronym for "Fuck It Dog, Life's A Risk". The name stuck when every member of the band, with the exception of guitarist Elvis Keuhn, had the word tattooed on their bodies after a night of heavy drinking.
- Filter – The industrial rock band Filter, formed in 1993 by Richard Patrick and Brian Liesegang, chose their name based on finding "cool sounding words" in a darkroom manual, according to a young reporter's interview with the band. The word "filter" in that context likely referred to photo development tools.
- Finger Eleven – The band's name comes from an earlier version of the song "Thin Spirits" from the album Tip. Lead singer, Scott Anderson explains: “when everything is pushing you in one direction and your instinct drives you in another–that's finger eleven.”
- Finntroll – According to band members Vreth and Skrymer, they took their name from an old Finnish legend where Swedish priests coming to Finland had an encounter with a wild-looking man who killed most of their party. The survivors came back bearing the tale of the Finn-Troll.
- Firefall — From the Yosemite Firefall, where owners of a hotel near Yosemite National Park threw burning logs off a cliff to entertain guests.
- First Aid Kit – Member Klara Söderberg explains: "I was 13, young and naïve and looking through a dictionary, looking for a name. Like I wanted something, if I would ever make music, I wanted to have a name for it, and I found First Aid Kit and just liked the meaning of it. I think music should be like a consolation to help you get through everyday life, and it does for me. I thought, if I ever make music, that's what I want my music to do. And when we started making music, it kinda stuck around."
- Five Iron Frenzy – According to former bassist Keith Hoerig, a roommate of the band members would defend himself with a golf club, out of fear that he'd get attacked, and called it "putter mayhem". Guitarist Scott Kerr noticed that the roommate's club was a five iron and said, "No, more like a Five Iron Frenzy."
- Five Finger Death Punch – Named after the fictional martial arts move called the "five point palm exploding heart technique" from the movies Kill Bill, which kills its victim by causing their heart to explode once they take five steps after being struck.
- Five for Fighting – An ice hockey expression, meaning a five-minute major penalty for participating in a fight.
- The Fixx – After The Fix, as they had been known, were signed, MCA Records insisted the band change its name because of its drug-culture connotations. The band offered to double the "x" as a compromise.
- Fleetwood Mac – Named after members, Mick Fleetwood and John McVie.
- Flo Rida – Flo Rida’s stage name is a stylized homage to his home state of Florida, where he was born in Carol City. The name, adopted by rapper Tramar Dillard, serves as a play on words, highlighting his roots while also acting as a pun on the term "flow rider," reflecting his fast-paced rapping style.
- Florence + The Machine – The name of Florence and the Machine is attributed to front-woman Florence Welch's teenage collaboration with keyboardist and co-writer Isabella "Machine" Summers. Welch and Summers performed together for a time under the names of "Florence Robot" and "Isa Machine", respectively. Later, this was shortened to Florence and the Machine as it was felt to be too cumbersome.
- Flying Lotus – The name comes from his ideal superpower. "When I was a kid I would always bother people about super heroes and I was like, 'Ok if you could have any superpower in the creation of comic books what would you have, x-ray vision, you could be like invisible, what would you do?' I wanted to fly. That's it. That's all."
- Flyleaf – Originally called Passerby, The band got its name, suggested by bassist Pat Seals, to represent the blank,, often inscribed page at the beginning or end of a book. The band chose this to symbolize a moment of clarity, a fresh start, or a personal message, reflecting their, especially vocalist Lacey Sturm's, perspective on life and faith.
- Foo Fighters – Adopted from a term used by Allied aircraft pilots in World War II to describe various UFOs or mysterious aerial phenomena. Dave Grohl, who had recorded most of the songs largely on his own, chose the name to create the impression others were involved. "Had I actually considered this to be a career, I probably would have called it something else, because it's the stupidest fucking band name in the world."
- Foster the People – Originally called "Foster & the People" by frontman Mark Foster, but changed when many of his friends misunderstood the name as "Foster the People". In a 2011 interview, Foster also recalled, "'Foster the People'–that's like 'Take Care of the People', 'Do Something for the People'... The first few shows that we played were for charities. It kind of clicked: Foster the People, that's us."
- Fountains of Wayne – Member Adam Schlesinger got his driver's license at the DMV office next to a lawn ornament store (no longer in business) in Wayne, NJ called "Fountains of Wayne". "We just thought it was funny", Schlesinger said.\
- The Four Freshmen – The group had been performing as the Toppers, but as their agent already had a band named the Cottontoppers in his stable, he renamed them the Freshmen Four to avoid confusion. The group reversed it to the name they became famous under.
- Four Jacks and a Jill – The South African band, originally known as "The Nevadas" and later "The Zombies", adopted their new name in 1966 when singer Glenys Lynne joined the four male members (Clive Harding, Keith Andrews, Bruce Bark, and Tony Hughes). The name was coined by comedian Jimmy Casanova and agent Don Hughes to highlight this lineup change.
- The Four Seasons – Taken from the bowling alley in Union Township, Union County, New Jersey, where the band used to audition.
- John Foxx – Dennis Leigh took his stage name at the same time the band he founded became Ultravox!. "Foxx is much more intelligent than I am, better looking, better lit". he said. "A kind of naively perfected entity."
- Framing Hanley – Originally known as "Embers Fade", they changed their name to Framing Hanley in 2007, shortly after Ashley Hanley, fiancée of a member of the band (and a photographer, whence "Framing"), died.
- Frankie Goes to Hollywood – The name Frankie Goes to Hollywood taken from a poster on the wall of an old prison cell where the band used to rehearse. The poster has the headline "Frankie Goes to Hollywood", which referred to Frank Sinatra's move from Las Vegas to Los Angeles. It was chosen by a friend and local artist, named Ambrose, from strange Liverpool cult group Pink Military.
- Franz Ferdinand – The band Franz Ferdinand originally got their name from a racehorse called Archduke Ferdinand, which they saw win the Northumberland Plate in 2001.
- Frente! – The Australian band took its name from a Spanish word meaning "forehead" or "front". The name originated without the exclamation point at the end; it was added for their 1991 debut EP release, Whirled. The rationale, as stated by lead vocalist Angie Hart, was while "[w]e don't write our name like that, but we thought we would on the CD covers because it looks good."
- Frightened Rabbit - "Frightened Rabbit" was a nickname frontman Scott Hutchinson's mother gave him, due to his shyness as a child.
- Fröbelin Palikat – The name (Finnish for "Fröbel's blocks") derives from the educational toy blocks designed by German pedagogue Friedrich Fröbel.
- Front 242 – "Front" was chosen for its suggestions of a popular movement and because the word means the same thing in many languages without any spelling changes. Despite much speculation over the years about what "242" refers to, the band says it has no meaning, chosen simply because it looked good.
- The Fugs – "Fugs" is a euphemism for the F-word in Norman Mailer's novel, The Naked and the Dead. Band member Tuli Kupferberg is credited with choosing the name.

== G ==
- Kenny G – After leaving the Jeff Lorber Fusion to start a solo career, Kenny Gorelick decided to just use his last initial because "it had a nice ring to it."
- G&G Sindikatas – The Lithuanian hip-hop group originally started in 1995 as a duo called (simply as) "G&G," named after the first initials of its founding members, Svaras (Gabrielius Liaudanskas) and Giga. When Giga later left and new members like Kastetas, Donciavas, and DJ Mamania joined around 1998–1999 to record their debut album, they added "Sindikatas" (Syndicate) to the moniker to reflect a unified crew, collective alliance, or brotherhood operating like a tight-knit urban organization.
- Galaxie 500 – After the Ford Galaxie car owned by a friend of the band's.
- Gang of Four – Named after the Gang of Four, a political faction in 1960s–1970s -era China.
- Garbage – Either lead singer Shirley Manson's father yelled down to the band at one of their basement practice sessions, "Play more quietly–you sound like garbage", or from a friend of drummer Butch Vig, who said "This stuff sounds like garbage!".
- The Gathering – Taken from the film Highlander, where it is mentioned that there will be a gathering once with all the immortals of the story.
- Genesis – Charterhouse School alumnus Jonathan King attended a concert at Charterhouse in 1968 while the band were still in school. King was a songwriter and record producer who had a hit single at the time, "Everyone's Gone to the Moon". King named the band Genesis (after previously suggesting the name Gabriel's Angels after lead singer Peter Gabriel), recalling that he had "thought it was a good name... it suggested the beginning of a new sound and a new feeling."
- Genitorturers – The industrial metal band Genitorturers got their name from lead singer Gen (Jennifer Zimmerman), who discovered the term while exploring underground subculture literature in an Orlando bookstore during the late 1980s. She encountered a color-coded signaling system where the color purple represented "genitorture," a term that perfectly aligned with her vision for an extreme, provocative musical project. Originally forming as a hardcore punk trio called The Festering Genitorturers while Gen was a student at Rollins College, the name was later shortened when she took over as frontwoman. The name was intentionally chosen to bridge the gap between aggressive music and the theatrical, transgressive aesthetics of fetish and performance art, establishing a shock-rock identity that has defined the band for decades.
- Georgia Wonder – Georgia Wonder was the stage name of Lulu Hurst, a 'magnetic phenomenon' whose vaudeville act toured America in the late 19th century. Stephanie Grant and Julian Moore from the band chose the name after trying to duplicate these powers from an exposé they discovered in a book about the period.
- Glades – Comes from a ski run that member Cameron Robertson saw during a holiday.
- Gary Glitter – To develop a stage name, Paul Gadd worked with alliterative names where the surname was a common object going backwards from Z until he reached one he liked at G.
- Godflesh – Originally Fall of Because, Godflesh, formed in 1988 in Birmingham, UK, by Justin Broadrick and B.C. Green, was named to represent the blend of the spiritual and the physical, symbolizing industrial music that is both immense and crushing. Broadrick described the name as "God" representing the immense, and "flesh" representing the physical effect of their music.
- Godhead – The industrial rock band Godhead, known for being the only band signed to Marilyn Manson's Posthuman Records, derived their name from a role-playing game setting. Vocalist Jason Charles Miller revealed the inspiration came from "The Haven of the Godhead," a location featured in a 1984 Fantasy Gamer magazine issue. The term itself refers to divine nature, which the band felt represented their music.
- Godsmack – The band's moniker comes from an Alice in Chains song from the album Dirt of the same name.
- God Lives Underwater – The band God Lives Underwater (GLU) got its name through a creative play on words involving a previous project name. According to the co-founder Jeff Turzo, he had initially suggested the name "Glue" which late vocalist David Reilly then expanded into the full phrase "God Lives Underwater" by using the first three letters (G-L-U) as an acronym. Despite the evocative imagery, both band members admitted in interviews that the choice didn't carry a deep or specific meaning; rather, they needed a name quickly after attracting interest from producer Rick Rubin and his label, American Recordings, and simply liked the way it sounded.
- Gorgoroth – Means "horror" in Sindarin, one of Tolkien's constructed languages.
- Gotye – Wouter de Becker, born in Belgium to parents who emigrated to Australia while he was an infant, was enrolled in school under the name Walter. But his mother always called him by the French version of his first name, Gauthier, and his stage name is the phonetic spelling.
- Gov't Mule – Pronounced "government mule" – A term used by Allman Brothers Band drummer Jaimoe when commenting admiringly on the derriere of James Brown's wife Adrienne.
- Grateful Dead – The name was chosen from a dictionary. According to Phil Lesh, in his biography (pp. 62), "...Jerry Garcia picked up an old Britannica World Language Dictionary... In that silvery elf-voice he said to me, 'Hey, man, how about the Grateful Dead?'" The definition there was "the soul of a dead person, or his angel, showing gratitude to someone who, as an act of charity, arranged their burial." According to Alan Trist, director of the Grateful Dead's music publisher company Ice Nine, Garcia found the name in the Funk & Wagnalls Folklore Dictionary, when his finger landed on that phrase while playing a game of "dictionary". In the Garcia biography, Captain Trips, author Sandy Troy states that the band was smoking the psychedelic DMT at the time. The term "grateful dead" appears in folktales of a variety of cultures.
- Great White – The band's manager suggested the name change after hearing a boy outside the Troubadour club, where the band played some of its early shows, call out "there goes Great White" when guitarist Mark Kendall, who often complemented his pale blond hair with white clothing and a white guitar, stuck his head out the window of a passing car.
- Green Day – A slang term for a day spent smoking marijuana. Frontman Billie Joe Armstrong wrote a song called "Green Day" about his first experience with the drug, and it soon replaced "Sweet Children" as the band's name.
- Green River – Mark Arm and Steve Turner have given several explanations for the name over the years—a local community college, the song by Creedence Clearwater Revival, with the most likely being the Green River Killer, prominent in Seattle-area headlines at the time, the name serial murderer Gary Ridgway was known by before his arrest. Turner later characterized the name as "a dumb joke".
- Grimes – Claire Elise Boucher's stage name came from listing "grime music", three times as the genre for her early uploads to MySpace in 2007 despite not knowing what the term referred to.
- The Guess Who – After Chad Allan and The Reflections had to change the latter half of the band's name to "The Expressions" to avoid confusion with another band named The Reflections that had had a hit, their label came up with the idea of releasing their next single, "Shakin' All Over", under the name "The Guess Who?" to create the impression that it was a well-known British Invasion band. Even after the real artist was revealed, radio disc jockeys kept using "the Guess Who". The band at first resisted, but eventually gave in and made it their name.
- Gym Class Heroes – The band got its moniker from a sarcastic term coined by founders Travie McCoy and drummer Matt McGinley while they were high school students in Geneva, New York. While standing in alphabetical order for their physical education class, they used the phrase to mock the students who took gym class far too seriously—those who "would just go all out and get sweaty and reek of body odor for the rest of the day". Ironically, while McCoy and McGinley considered themselves more like "gym class zeros" who fell outside the popular crowd, they adopted the name to highlight their unique, anti-cool origin story as a band that formed in that specific environment.

== H ==
- Haircut One Hundred – According to Nick Heyward, "it was the one that made us laugh the most" when they brainstormed names.
- Lzzy Hale – Born ELizabeth Mae Hale IV, Halestorm's singer-guitarist started going by a fan's misspelling of her name on the band's website.
- Halsey – Ashley Nicolette Frangipane took her stage name, also a slight anagram of her first name, from the Halsey Street subway station in the New York City borough of Brooklyn, where she was living at the age of 17 when she began writing songs. "I started to feel like I was a part of something bigger than my town in middle of nowhere New Jersey", she explained. "Halsey is kind of like a manifestation of all the exaggerated parts of me, so it's like an alter ego."
- Hanoi Rocks – From "Hanoi rock", a type of pink heroin produced in Hanoi. The name was invented by Andy McCoy as an allusion to the Johnny Thunders/The Ramones song Chinese Rocks as "Chinese rock" is a type of white heroin that can be further refined into "Hanoi rock".
- Hard-Fi – "Hard-Fi" is the name given to the sound produced by Lee "Scratch" Perry, a Grammy award-winning reggae and dub artist, at his Black Ark recording studio. Being admirers of Perry's work, the band decided to name themselves after his distinctive sound.
- Hassisen Kone – Named after "Hassisen kone", a real-life home appliance store in the band's home town Joensuu. The owner of the store was offended by the band's choice of name and renamed the store as "Joensuun konepalvelu".
- Hawkwind – Named for member Nik Turner's "prodigious habit of spitting and flatulence."
- Hawthorne Heights – From the famous author Nathaniel Hawthorne.
- H-Blockx – The band's name is a tribute to the 1981 Irish hunger strikers of HM Prison Maze colloquially titled "H-Blocks".
- Headstones – The Canadian punk rock band got their name from a suggestion by Trent Carr while the band was playing in a small Toronto bar called the Blue Moon Saloon, having previously considered calling themselves "The Tombstones". Vocalist Hugh Dillon and the band formed in 1989 and solidified the name simply because it stuck, rather than having a deeper, more dramatic meaning.
- Heart – The band changed its name from The Army to White Heart after guitarist Roger Fisher asked a friend of his brother's if he could use the name (originally White Hart, from science fiction writer Arthur C. Clarke's short-story collection Tales from the White Hart) for his own band. Fisher added the "e", and eventually the band dropped the "White".
- Heaven 17 – From a line in Anthony Burgess' novel A Clockwork Orange, a fictional band mentioned by a young woman in the record store.
- Herman's Hermits – A publican noticed that Peter Noone looked like Sherman from the Rocky & Bullwinkle cartoons. That became his nickname, soon shortened to just Herman. The band then went from being Herman and his Hermits to just using the possessive.
- Hevisaurus – From "hevi", the Finnish spelling of the word "heavy" (as in heavy metal), and "saurus" (as in dinosaur).
- HIM – An acronym for His Infernal Majesty.
- The Hollies – After Buddy Holly.
- Honeymoon Suite – The band was founded in Niagara Falls, Ontario, Canada, a popular post-nuptial destination for newlywed couples.
- Hoobastank – Derived from a street where Doug Robb's brother (the vice president of BMW Motorcycles, who lives in Germany) lives, called Hooba Street "or something like that".
- The Hooters – From a nickname for the melodica, a harmonica-like instrument with a keyboard.
- Hootie and the Blowfish – Lead singer Darius Rucker derived the name from two friends from college. One had an owlish face and was nicknamed "Hootie", while the other had puffy cheeks and was called "the Blowfish".
- Hot Tuna – Originally Hot Shit, the members realized they needed a less provocative name. "Hot Tuna" came from someone Jorma Kaukonen recalled as having responded with that phrase to the line ""What's that smell like fish, oh baby" when the band was performing "Keep On Truckin'".
- The Human League – In 1978, following major changes in the lineup of his band The Future, founder Martyn Ware decided to change its name to something that conveyed the band's intent to make electronic music that was more emotionally engaging than the genre was perceived as being at the time. He chose the name Human League from one of the factions in the science fiction strategy board game Starforce: Alpha Centauri.
- The Hunna – From the members using the word "hunna" in conversations with each other, and "to influence other people to pick up an instrument, or anything, any passion that they may have, give 100%."
- Hurriganes – An intentional misspelling of the word "hurricanes". Remu Aaltonen, the band's vocalist, spoke no English at the time the band was formed.
- Hüsker Dü – Named after Hūsker Dū?, a Scandinavian memory-based board game that means (properly spelled as Husker Du? without the macrons) "Do you remember?" in Danish and Norwegian. The band chose this after it was shouted out by an audience member at one of their early shows.

== I ==
- I Dont Know How but They Found Me – Vocalist Dallon Weekes has said that the name is a Back to the Future quote.
- Ice Cube – Born as O'Shea Jackson, the rapper Ice Cube got his stage name from his older brother, Clyde, when he was around 13 years old. While growing up in South Central Los Angeles, Jackson was known for being "too cool" and would often flirt with his older brother’s girlfriends when they called the house, prompting his brother to become tired of his actions. In frustration, his brother threatened to "slam him into a freezer and pull him out when he was an ice cube". Rather than being offended, O'Shea took the nickname as a "badge of honor" and decided it was a better name than "O'Shea," quickly adopting it and cementing it as his rap moniker.
- Ice-T – Rapper Ice-T (born Tracy Lauren Marrow) adopted his stage name as a tribute to author Iceberg Slim (Robert Maupin Beck III), whose gritty novels he famously recited to friends in high school. His peers encouraged him by saying, "Yo, kick some more of that by Ice, T," which inspired the moniker combining "Ice" and his first initial.
- Icehouse – Having performed for several years as Flowers, the band was forced to change their name for legal reasons when Chrysalis Records signed them, in order to ensure distribution outside Australia. They chose the name of their upcoming album.
- Iggy Pop – From the band The Iguanas which he played in and a character called "Pop" whom he resembled.
- Imagine Dragons – Their name is an anagram for a phrase only known to members of the group, that lead singer Dan Reynolds stated each member approved of.
- InCulto – The Lithuanian musical group derived its name from a creative fusion of Latin rhythms and local influences, as conceptualized by the Colombian-Lithuanian musician Jurgis Didžiulis. Formed in 2003, the group sought to experiment with diverse musical trends—such as ska, funk, and Latin beats-to create a "balanced mix of old and new". The name "InCulto" is rooted in this desire to merge different cultures and styles into a single entity, reflecting the band's creative energy and its goal of bridging organic and synthetic sounds. This concept of "uncultured" or "in-culture" playfulness was central to their identity as they introduced Latin-inspired funk to the Lithuanian club scene.
- Indigo Girls — "We needed a name and we went through the dictionary looking for words that struck us and indigo was one", explains Emily Saliers.
- Infectious Grooves – The band got their name to reflect their signature, highly danceable "funk metal" sound, specifically referencing the idea of music that is catchy or "infectious". Formed in 1989 by Suicidal Tendencies vocalist Mike Muir, the name was finalized to accompany their debut 1991 album title, The Plague That Makes Your Booty Move... It\'s the Infectious Grooves.
- Insane Clown Posse – After deciding to abandon gangsta rap for horrorcore, the members of Inner City Posse realized they needed to rename themselves to reflect that change. Joseph Utsler said the new name should keep the "ICP" initials so fans would recognize they were still performing. Joseph Bruce then recalled a dream he had had about a strange clown running around, and that spurred the change to "Insane Clown".
- INXS – Phonetic play on "In excess", resulting from playing around with all-caps acronyms, particularly the British band XTC and the Australian jam manufacturer Henry Jones IXL, after it was suggested to the band that they come up with a new name.
- Iron & Wine – Stage name of Samuel "Sam" Ervin Beam; the name Iron & Wine is taken from a dietary supplement named "Beef, Iron & Wine" that he found in a general store while shooting a film.
- Iron Maiden – Steve Harris named the band after the iron maiden torture device as shown in the 1939 film The Man in the Iron Mask.
- Iron Reagan – The moniker of the band is a pun on the heavy metal band Iron Maiden and the 40th president of the United States, Ronald Reagan.
- Irwin Goodman – Stage name of Antti Hammarberg; According to his friend Vexi Salmi, the name came from an amalgam of the names of Irving Berlin and Benny Goodman.
- Iwrestledabearonce – The band's moniker was inspired by a humorous, absurd comment made by actor Gary Busey on a Comedy Central program. Formed in 2007 in Shreveport, Louisiana, the band adopted this bizarre phrase to match their chaotic, genre-blending musical style.

== J ==
- The Jacksons – As a settlement of Motown's breach of contract lawsuit against them when they signed with Epic Records, the brothers allowed their original label to retain the rights to the name "Jackson 5", so they dropped the number and used just their family name.
- Jah Wobble – John Wardle took his stage name from a drunken Sid Vicious's attempt to say his given name, realizing in that moment it would not be easy to forget.
- James – The band members had decided to use one of their first names as their name, and Jim Glennie proposed his full name, as neither he nor anyone else ever used it, after they had rejected two other members' names.
- Jamiroquai – A portmanteau of the words, "jam" and "iroquai"; the latter is based on the Iroquois, a Native American confederacy.
- Jane's Addiction – Jane was Jane Bainter, Perry Farrell's housemate at the time of the band's formation. When Farrell and his girlfriend were pondering band names, she came up with Jane's Heroin Experience. Farrell softened the last part to "addiction", to be less negative so that people would be more likely to consider seeing the band.
- Japan – A placeholder adopted when the band needed to have a name. Guitarist David Sylvian planned to come up with a permanent one, but never did.
- Jefferson Airplane – Shortened from Blind Lemon Jefferson Airplane, which, according to Jorma Kaukonen, was coined by a friend as a satire of blues pseudonyms such as Blind Lemon Jefferson.
- Jethro Tull – Having trouble getting repeat bookings, the band took to changing their name frequently to continue playing the London club circuit. Band names were often supplied by their booking agents' staff, one of whom, a history enthusiast, eventually dubbed them "Jethro Tull" after the 18th-century agriculturist. The name stuck because they were using it the first time a club manager liked their show enough to invite them to return.
- Jimmy Eat World – "Jimmy" is guitarist Tom Linton's younger brother, who had a weight problem. Lead vocalist Jim Adkins' younger brother drew a picture on Jimmy's door of him putting a globe in his mouth, and wrote on it "Jimmy Eat World". It eventually inspired the band's name.
- Jimmie's Chicken Shack – Jimmie’s Chicken Shack formed in Annapolis, Maryland, in 1993 after frontman Jimi Haha returned from a two-year snowboarding hiatus and began acoustic jam sessions with friends. The band chose their name as a tribute to Jimmy’s Chicken Shack, a legendary Harlem restaurant and jazz club frequented by iconic figures like Malcolm X, Redd Foxx, and Charlie Parker. Despite the name sharing a similar sound to the lead singer's, the band intentionally used the "Jimmie's" spelling to clarify it was not named after any specific member. Emerging as a versatile "muttrock" group, they blended funk-metal, rock, and ska, eventually rising to national fame through MTV and their 1997 major-label debut, Pushing the Salmanilla Envelope.
- Joan Jett – Born Joan Larkin, she took the name after her parents divorced and she started exploring music as a career. Initially she said it was her mother's maiden name, but later admitted it was not, and that she just liked the "rock star sound".
- John Cougar — John Mellencamp's first manager insisted he adopt the name "Johnny Cougar" for his first album Chestnut Street Incident, since Mellencamp's given name was "too hard to market". For later albums this was shortened to John Cougar. After the success of American Fool, the record company acceded to Cougar's request to release the followup, Uh-Huh under the name John Cougar Mellencamp. He dropped the original stage name entirely in 1991.
- Joku Paikallinen Bändi – Finnish for "some local band". Invented as a joke by founding member Heikki "Heme" Vieresjoki when he was working as a doorman at Finnish restaurants and could not remember the name of the band currently playing at the premise.
- Journey – Suggested by one of the band's roadies after a contest held by a local radio station to name the band failed to produce a winner.
- Joy Division – In order to avoid confusion with the London punk band Warsaw Pakt, the band renamed themselves from Warsaw to Joy Division in late 1977, borrowing their new name from the prostitution wing of a Nazi concentration camp mentioned in the 1955 novel The House of Dolls.
- JVG – From the initials of the members of the band, Jare Joakim Brand and Ville-Petteri Galle.

== K ==
- Käärijä – Means "wrapper", as in "one who wraps something" in Finnish, comes from gambling, recurring theme in the artist's music.
- Kaliber 44 – The name of the Polish rap group Kaliber 44 originated during their early years when the members "played gangsta," though they later provided more symbolic interpretations for each part of the title. The word "Kaliber" (Caliber) was eventually defined as representing the "caliber" or magnitude of the social and personal problems addressed in their lyrics. The number "44" is a direct reference to the prophetic figure "Forty and Four" from the poetic drama Dziady (Forefathers' Eve) by the famous Polish Romantic poet Adam Mickiewicz, specifically Part III, where the number is prophesied as Poland's savior. By combining a technical term associated with firearms and weight with a revered literary reference, the group aimed to blend modern urban grit with traditional Polish cultural commentary.
- Kansas - After the U.S. state of Kansas.
- Kaiser Chiefs – After the South African Kaizer Chiefs Football Club, the former team of long-serving former Leeds United captain Lucas Radebe.
- KAJ – From the initials of the first names of the founding members Kevin Holmström, Axel Åhman, and Jakob Norrgård.
- Kari Tapio – From Kari, the artist's real first name, and Tapio, a modified form of his real second name Tapani.
- Kasabian – After Linda Kasabian, a member of the Manson Family famous for serving as Charles Manson's getaway driver.
- Kassidy – Inspired by Butch Cassidy and the Sundance Kid.
- Keane – After Cherry Keane, an old woman who used to look after the band members when they were children.
- The Killers – From the bass drum of a fictional band in the music video for the New Order song "Crystal".
- Killing Joke – "The killing joke is like when people watch something like Monty Python on the television and laugh, when really they're laughing at themselves", explains founder Jaz Coleman. "It's like a soldier in the First World War. He's in the trench, he knows his life is gone and that within the next ten minutes he's gonna be dead ... and then suddenly he realises that some cunt back in Westminster's got him sussed—'What am I doing this for? I don't want to kill anyone, I'm just being controlled'."
- Killswitch Engage – From an episode of The X-Files.
- King Crimson – The band name was coined by lyricist Peter Sinfield as a synonym for Beelzebub, prince of demons. According to Robert Fripp, Beelzebub would be an anglicised form of the Arabic phrase "B'il Sabab", meaning "the man with an aim". Historically and etymologically, a "crimson king" was any monarch during whose reign there was civil unrest and copious bloodshed.
- King Krule – Originally known as Zoo Kid, he chose the name King Krule from the Elvis Presley film King Creole.
- The Kings of Nuthin' – As the Boston Blackouts increasingly played outside Massachusetts, they changed their name to the Kings of Nuthin' in the summer of 1999, naming themselves after the jacket club Kings A' Nuthin' from Orlando, Florida, where bassist Spike Katz was touring with the Racketeers and thought the name would fit the band perfectly. Subsequently, there were members who contributed to both groups, for example, the interlude in the song "Kings of Nuthin'" was spoken by a member of Kings A' Nuthin'.
- The Kinks – In 1964, the band decided to change its name from The Ravens. Their manager suggested the Kinks as that would draw some attention to the band. Founder Ray Davies, who has never liked the name, says it was specifically a reference to the band's fashion sense.
- KISS – Coined by word association with Peter Criss's previous band LIPS.
- Kix – The Maryland-based glam metal band Kix, originally formed in 1978 and known by names like "The Shooze" and "The Generators," chose the moniker KIX in the early 1980s as a last-minute decision necessitated by a legal branding crisis. Guitarist Brian "Damage" Forsythe has recounted that when the band was forced to change their name, they were looking for something simple, memorable, and high-energy. They settled on KIX, a one-syllable name that echoed the rock-and-roll spirit of that era, reminiscent of the punchy branding of bands like KISS. The name ultimately became a tongue-in-cheek reference to the cereal "Kix," a nod to the bubblegum-pop influence and mischievous energy in their early music, which they further cemented with the early song "Kix Are for Kids".
- Klaxons – Originally "Klaxons (Not Centaurs)", a quote from Filippo Tommaso Marinetti's futurism text The Futurist Manifesto. Also in an interview a band member stated Klaxons "is to toot to be a loud intrusive noise to disrupt".
- KJ-52 – Hybrid name of this artist's first rap name "KJ" coupled with the New Testament Miracle of feeding the multitude with five loaves and two fish, Mark 8:1–9 and Matthew 15:32–39.
- KMFDM – An initialism for the nonsensical and grammatically incorrect German phrase Kein Mehrheit Für Die Mitleid, which was intended to mean "No pity for the majority". Chosen as a motto from words cut of a German newspaper for an exposition for young European artists and afterwards it was initialized as the name of the band.
- Knife Party – From the song "Knife Prty" by Deftones. The name caused consternation at first as it implied that they supported knife crime, although Rob Swire stated that "...we're not advocating any type of knife-related crime any more than Swedish House Mafia were advocating organised crime."
- Knuckle Puck – The band's name was inspired by a Stick to Your Guns t-shirt that said "Knuckle Puck Crew."
- Kool & The Gang — Robert Bell had gotten his "Kool" nickname growing up on the streets of Jersey City for his relaxed attitude. After he started a career in music and got a band together, it was originally "Kool & The Flames" until their manager recommended the rename to avoid confusion with James Brown's backup band, The Famous Flames.
- Korn – The band had considered and rejected "Corn", until James Shaffer proposed spelling it with a "K" instead. He also designed the logo, which offsets what they all agreed was the silliness of the name by styling it with a backwards "R" (Я), an idea taken from the Toys R Us chain where most of the band had worked at one time or another.
- Krewella – The band's name stems from member Jahan Yousaf's misspelling of the word "cruel" when she and her sister Yasmine began writing music, and is not a reference to Cruella de Vil.

== L ==
- Lacuna Coil – The band took their name from combining Italian and English words: "Lacuna" (Italian/Latin for a gap or lack, like of memory) and "Coil" (English for a spiral), meaning something like "Empty Spiral," reflecting their vision on life after finding their previous name, Ethereal, was taken. The band started as Sleep of Right, changed to Ethereal, and finally settled on Lacuna Coil when signing with Century Media in 1997.
- L.A. Guns – The name L.A. Guns comes from its co-founder, guitarist Tracii Guns, combining his last name with the "L.A." (Los Angeles) scene where the band formed, solidifying their identity in the 1980s glam metal era. The band was pivotal in the Los Angeles rock scene, with Tracii Guns later briefly forming the precursor to Guns N' Roses (which merged L.A. Guns and Hollywood Rose) before reforming L.A. Guns, leading to name disputes and the band's iconic status.
- The La's – The band was formed in Liverpool, and "la" is a well-known Scouse phrase meaning "lad" or "mate".
- Lady Gaga – Lady Gaga got her stage name in 2006 from a serendipitous autocorrect error while working with music producer Rob Fusari, who referred to her theatrical style by referencing Queen's song "Radio Ga Ga". Fusari texted her "Radio Ga Ga," but his phone autocorrected "Radio" to "Lady," leading to the moniker Lady Gaga.
- Ladytron – From the song "Ladytron" by Roxy Music.
- La Roux – The band's name refers to singer Elly Jackson's red hair and tomboyish appearance, mingling the masculine ("le roux") and feminine ("la rousse") French terms; she has said: "To me, it means 'red-haired one'–and it does, vaguely. It's just a male version of 'red-haired one'".
- Lääz Rockit – Lääz Rockit's name comes from a pun on the LAWS (Light Anti-tank Weapon System) rocket used by Clint Eastwood's character in the 1976 movie The Enforcer, inspired by a scene where he shoots a tower, with the band adopting the "Lääz" spelling for its phonetic similarity and raw, explosive feel, replacing their original name Depth Charge.
- Laid Back – the Danish synthpop duo formed in 1979 by Tim Stahl and John Guldberg, derived their name from their relaxed, easygoing, and unhurried approach to creating music. The name reflects their style, developed while jamming in a small, cozy Copenhagen studio.
- Lasgo – From the Scottish city Glasgow with the first and last letters removed.
- Led Zeppelin – The band name "Led Zeppelin" refers to the Hindenburg disaster; and a joke made by Keith Moon and John Entwistle. The two were discussing the idea of forming a band with some prominent young guitarists at the time. Moon and Entwistle suggested that a supergroup containing themselves, Jimmy Page, and Jeff Beck would go down like a "lead balloon", a British idiom for disastrous results. They intentionally misspelled the name to ensure correct pronunciation by announcers.
- Geddy Lee – Rush's lead singer and bassist was born Gershon Lee Weinrib. When embarking on his musical career he decided to go by Gary Lee. "Geddy" is an imitation of his Polish-born mother's pronunciation of "Gary"; he has since made that its legal spelling.
- The Lemonheads – Named after the Lemonhead candy produced by the Ferrara Candy Company.
- Lemon Joy – Lemon Joy is a Lithuanian synthpop group, originally formed in the early 1990s as "Etaž-3" (The 3rd floor) before adopting their current name. Their first concert under the name "Lemon's Joy" took place in March 1996 in Kaunas. The name reflects a shift toward a brighter, electronic sound, often interpreted as combining a somewhat bittersweet or sharp ("lemon") element with joy, fitting their melodic pop style.
- Letters to Cleo – The name refers to lead singer Kay Hanley's childhood pen pal Cleo.
- Let's Active – From a mistranslation of "Let's Get Physical" into Japanese seen on a T-shirt there.
- Level 42 – From the Hitchhikers Guide To The Galaxy series of books by Douglas Adams. Some confusion surrounded the name in early years outside their home country of the UK when, bored of journalists asking the same question "What does the band name mean" over and over they started to give different daft answers to amuse themselves, amongst them being that they were named after the worlds highest multi story car park etc.
- Alex Lifeson – Rush's guitarist was born Aleksandar Živojinović to Serb immigrants to Canada. He performs under "Lifeson", an English calque of his birth name, which literally means "son of life".
- Lights – Born Valerie Poxleitner, "Lights" stemmed as a shortened nickname for her last name. She legally changed her name to Lights at age 18.
- Limp Bizkit - Fred Durst named the band Limp Bizkit because he wanted a name that would repel listeners. According to him, "The name is there to turn people's heads away. A lot of people pick up the disc and go, Limp Bizkit. Oh, they must suck."
- Lindemann – after lead vocalist Till Lindemann. "Lindemann" is a German occupational surname meaning "woodman".
- Linkin Park – Their name came from the lead singer, Chester Bennington, because they had to change their name due to copyright issues, and he drove past Lincoln Park in Santa Monica (now known as Christine Emerson Reed Park) on the way home from band practice. However, the domain "lincolnpark.com" was more than they could afford, so they changed the spelling to 'Linkin Park'.
- Little Feat – When founder Lowell George was with Frank Zappa's band, drummer Jimmy Carl Black teased him regularly about his "little feet". George followed the Beatles' example in changing the spelling when he used the name for his own band.
- Lizzo — A nickname Melissa Viviane Jefferson acquired (a variant of "Lissa" from her first name, its spelling inspired by Jay-Z's "Izzo (H.O.V.A.)") around the time she formed her first group in high school.
- Lord of the Flies – Band member Alex d'Aquino looked at different band names and saw "Of Mice of Men", so he thought of a great British classic, "Lord of the Flies", about a group of British boys stuck on an uninhabitable island who try to govern themselves with disastrous results.
- Lorde – Long fascinated by royalty and nobility, Ella Marija Lani Yelich-O'Connor added an "e" to "Lord" to make it more feminine as her stage name.
- The Lords of the New Church – Originally the Lords of Discipline, they changed it when they learned of an upcoming film by that name.
- Lothar and the Hand People – Band member Richard Willis had a dream in which an enslaved race called the Hand People was saved by a hero named Lothar. Later, well after the name had been chosen, they decided that Lothar was the name of the theremin used by member John Emelin.
- Love and Rockets – From the comic book series.
- Loverboy – After the band had gone out with their girlfriends one night, the name came to Paul Dean in a dream in which the Cover Girl makeup ads on the backs of magazines the women were reading became first Cover Boy, and then Lover Boy.
- The Lovin' Spoonful – When John Sebastian asked Fritz Richmond for help with a name, Richmond asked Sebastian what the band sounded like. Sebastian described it as a cross between Chuck Berry and Mississippi John Hurt. Richmond then suggested "the lovin' spoonful", a line from Hurt's Hurt's 1963 song "Coffee Blues."
- Lynyrd Skynyrd – After Leonard Skinner, a gym teacher at Robert E. Lee High School in Jacksonville, Florida who was notorious for strictly enforcing the school's policy against boys having long hair.

== M ==
- Machine Head – Machine Head, formed in 1991 in Oakland, California, by Robb Flynn and Adam Duce, chose their name simply because they thought it "sounded cool". Despite popular belief, it is not a direct tribute to the Deep Purple album of the same name, although it was chosen to reflect a heavy, powerful sound.
- Machines of Loving Grace – The American industrial rock band got their name directly from the 1967 poem "All Watched Over by Machines of Loving Grace" written by San Francisco beat-era poet and counterculture figure Richard Brautigan. Frontman Scott Benzel originally dreamed up the moniker during high school after reading the piece, which envisions a cybernetic utopia where technology and nature harmonize to liberate humanity. When Benzel formed the group in Tucson, Arizona in 1989 alongside Stuart Kupers and Mike Fisher, the poetic phrase served as a perfect conceptual fit for their aggressive, electronics-heavy, and technological musical style.
- Mahavishnu Orchestra – Founder and guitarist John McLaughlin had received the name "Mahavishnu", from "great" and the Hindu deity Vishnu from his guru, Sri Chinmoy
- The Mamas & the Papas — From the Hells' Angels practice of referring to the women associated with members, or the gang as a whole, as "mamas".
- Måneskin – Danish for "moonlight", invented at random when Italian-Danish founding member Victoria De Angelis was asked by her fellow bandmembers to toss out some Danish words.
- Mannheim Steamroller – From the Mannheim roller found in 18th-century classical music, popularized by the Mannheim school of composers.
- Mano Negra – The band's name came to the group when reading a comic—the Condor series by Dominique Rousseau. "Mano Negra" was the name of a group of guerrilla fighters in South America, and the band liked the black-hand symbol. Ramón, the father of the Chao brothers, a political exilee of the Francoist dictatorship in Spain living in France, explained to Manu Chao, singer and guitarist of the band, the historical origins of the name which referred to an alleged secret, anarchist organization persecuted by the government. The band considered the name a good choice.
- Marcy Playground – From the Marcy Open School in Minneapolis, attended by John Wozniak in his childhood.
- Marillion – The band was originally called Silmarillion, taken from the title of a J.R.R. Tolkien novel. The name was eventually shortened to avoid possible legal problems.
- Marilyn Manson – For Marilyn Monroe and Charles Manson.
- Maroon 5 – The band's name comes from the band's early days in 1994 as Kara's Flowers, adding the "5" for the five members (including new guitarist James Valentine) and "Maroon" likely referencing their shared brief time at Five Towns College (whose color is maroon). Adam Levine says the real, silly reason for the name change is known only to the band members, who have only ever told Billy Joel.
- Marshall Tucker Band – While the band was discussing possible band names one evening in an old warehouse they had rented for rehearsal space, someone noticed that the warehouse's door key had the name "Marshall Tucker" inscribed on it, and suggested they call themselves "The Marshall Tucker Band", not realizing it referred to an actual person. It later came to light that Marshall Tucker, a blind piano tuner, had rented the space before the band, and his name was inscribed on the key. In his book, Top Pop Singles, 1955–2002, music historian Joel Whitburn attributes "Marshall Tucker" to the owner of the band's rehearsal hall.
- Matchbox Twenty – Originally titled as "Matchbox 20", the band took its name from a softball jersey with a "20" on it and a patch that had "Matchbox" written on it. The band altered its name to "Matchbox Twenty" after the release of its debut album Yourself or Someone Like You.
- Mattafix – Mattafix got their name as a play on the Caribbean patois phrase "matter fixed," which signifies "no problem" or that a situation is handled. Vocalist Marlon Roudette indicated it reflects the band's "mad mix" of multicultural backgrounds and stems from a fond expression used by a former teacher.
- MC5 – A shortening of the Motor City Five, the band's original name, reflecting their Detroit roots.
- McFly – Guitarist/vocalist/songwriter Tom Fletcher took the name from Marty McFly, main character of the film Back to the Future.
- Megadeth – While Dave Mustaine was traveling back to his home in the Bay Area on a bus after getting kicked out of his former band, Metallica, he would write lyrics on the back of a handbill to pass the time. The handbill itself quoted "The arsenal of megadeath can't be rid no matter what the peace treaties come to," which inspired him to use Megadeath as his band name. He dropped the A when he learned that "The Megadeaths" was a former name of Pink Floyd.
- Megan Thee Stallion – At 5 ft 10 in (1.78 m) in her late teens in her high school in Houston, Texas, Megan Jovon Ruth Pete was often referred to as a "stallion", a term used in the Southern United States for a tall, voluptuous woman. She adopted it as her stage name.
- Men at Work – Colin Hay came up with the name to go on a blackboard outside a pub where the band had just gotten a gig.
- Mercedes Bentso – A portmanteau of Mercedes-Benz and benzodiazepine.
- Metallica – A friend of Lars Ulrich was contemplating two names for a fan magazine he was starting. One was Metallica; Ulrich asked if he could use that name for his new band.
- Metric – Initially, their name was Mainstream. After releasing an EP titled Mainstream EP, they changed the band's name to Metric, after a sound that was programmed by the member James Shaw on his keyboard in 1998.
- MGMT – Disemvoweling of the band's original name, The Management.
- Midnight Oil – Peter Watson, at the time the band's keyboardist, suggested the name as one of several to be drawn from a hat.
- Mighty Mighty Bosstones — "Bosstones" came from playing around with "Boston", the city at the center of the metropolitan area the band members lived in. When they later discovered a 1950s a capella group had used the name, they added "Mighty Mighty" to avoid any legal issues.
- Minus the Bear – The name comes from an in-joke among the band members, referring to the 1970s television series B. J. and the Bear. "A friend of the band had gone on a date", explained the singer-guitarist Jake Snider, "and one of us asked him afterwards how the date went. Our friend said, 'You know that TV show from the '70s, B.J. and the Bear? It was like that... minus the Bear.' That's the straight truth."
- M.I.R.V. – M.I.R.V. is a San Francisco Bay Area funk/experimental/industrial metal band, primarily named after the nickname of lead guitarist and singer Marc "Mirv" Haggard, who was affectionately tagged as such due to a supposed resemblance to television personality Merv Griffin.
- Misery Index – The Baltimore death metal band named themselves after the Misery Index, an economic indicator created by Arthur Okun, defined as the sum of the unemployment rate and the annual inflation rate.
- Misfits – The band was named after a motion picture released in 1961 entitled The Misfits. The Misfits' skull logo was derived from the villain of the 1946 motion picture The Crimson Ghost.
- MKTO – The members' initials: Malcolm Kelley and Tony Oller.
- Modest Mouse – Derives from a passage from Virginia Woolf's story "The Mark on the Wall", which reads, "...and very frequent even in the minds of modest, mouse-coloured people..."
- Mogwai – Named after the creatures from the film Gremlins.
- Molly Hatchet – A 17th-century southern prostitute who allegedly beheaded and/or chopped up her clients.
- Moloko – From the narcotic-filled milk drink, Moloko Plus, in Anthony Burgess's novel A Clockwork Orange, based on the Russian for milk, молоко (moloko).
- Modern Talking – the German pop duo formed by Dieter Bohlen and Thomas Anders in 1984, derived their name from a, English-language shift from their original, planned German title. They initially considered calling themselves "Moderne Gespräche" (Modern Conversations) but changed it to Modern Talking to sound more international and appealing to a wider, global audience.
- Eddie Money – The singer shortened his last name from his given name, Mahoney, as a sarcastic joke about his frequent shortages of funds early in his career.<refSmith, Harrison (September 13, 2019). "Eddie Money, singer behind 'Take Me Home Tonight' and 'Two Tickets to Paradise,' dies at 70". The Washington Post. Archived from the original on September 16, 2019.<?ref>
- The Monkees – The band, after being formed for their TV show, was left to choose their own name. They saw how a slightly misspelled animal name had worked out for the Beatles and the Byrds, and hit on the Monkees from that.
- The Moody Blues – The band were originally named The M&B 5 after the Birmingham brewery Mitchells & Butlers. This was changed and the new name was inspired by a Duke Ellington song named "Mood Indigo".
- Moottörin Jyrinä – Moottorin jyrinä means "the rumble of an engine" in Finnish. The band added a heavy metal umlaut to the word "moottorin" as a parody of Motörhead.
- Morgoth – The principal antagonist in Tolkien's Silmarillion.
- The Motels – Originally from Berkeley, California, the Warfield Foxes were en route to an early gig at Los Angeles club The Troubadour when guitarist Dean Chamberlain noticed the many motels along Santa Monica boulevard and quipped that they ought to change their name to The Motels because "our name will be in lights all across the country".
- The Mothers of Invention – Originally named The Mothers, renamed to The Mothers of Invention by Frank Zappa after their record label Verve Records suggested that the band rename themselves as "mother" is a slang term for "motherfucker".
- Mötley Crüe – When Mick Mars was playing with his old cover band White Horse, he heard someone describing them as "motley-looking crew". He instantly took to the phrase and knew that someday he wanted to play in a band by that name. The spelling was eventually changed and umlauts were added.
- Motograter – Motograter's name originates from a unique, homemade, bass-heavy instrument created in 1995 by founding member Bruce Butler (known as "Grater"). This custom, industrial-style instrument consists of metal cables, sprockets, and machinery parts, designed to create a distinct, low-end sound that became the band's namesake.
- Motörhead – The band got their moniker from the final song vocalist Lemmy Kilmister wrote for his previous band, Hawkwind, called "Motorhead," which itself was British slang for a speed or amphetamine user; the name perfectly suited his new band's fast, loud, drug-fueled rock 'n' roll style, reflecting their "speedfreak" energy.
- Mott the Hoople – After signing the band by then known as Silence and making them replace their lead singer with Ian Hunter, Island Records executive Guy Stevens further suggested the band change its name to Mott the Hoople, after a novel by Willard Manus Stevens had read while in prison. After some resistance, the band agreed.
- The Mountain Goats – Taken from the Screamin' Jay Hawkins song "Yellow Coat", which contains the line "50 million bulldogs, 20 mountain goats, all gathered 'round at sundown to see my yellow coat."
- Mr. Bungle – The moniker originates from a character in the 1960s educational film Beginning Responsibility: Lunchroom Manners, which was famously featured on The Pee-wee Herman Show in 1981. The band, formed in 1985 in Eureka, California, adopted the name to reflect a chaotic, anti-heroic persona for their experimental, genre-bending music.
- Mr. President – The German Eurodance group (famous for their hit "Coco Jambo") chose their name based on a conceptual interpretation of the initials: "M" stands for Music, and "R" stands for Rhythm. Producers Jens Neumann and Kai Matthiesen felt "President" represented the highest, most authoritative position, thus reflecting their goal of leading the dance music scene.
- Mudvayne – The band Mudvayne got their name from a joke related to a, at the time, cash-strapped Chad Gray. While donating plasma, a nurse had trouble finding a vein, prompting him to remark that if she was looking for a "mud vein," she needed to look lower. The phrase became a recurring joke that eventually stuck as the band's name.
- Mumford & Sons – Marcus Mumford was always the most visible member, organizing the band and their performances from their beginnings in West London. Vocalist Ben Lovett indicated that the name was meant to invoke the sense of an "antiquated family business name".
- Mudhoney– From the 1965 film by Russ Meyer.
- Muse – Front-man Matt Bellamy stated that the band's name was mainly chosen because it looked professional on posters and the like. However, Bellamy has also stated that the name could possibly have stemmed from being raised in a family interested in Ouija and spirits. The bandmates first heard the word when someone in their hometown of Teignmouth, England, suggested that the reason for a lot of the town's populace becoming members of bands was a muse hovering over the town.
- My Bloody Valentine – Kevin Shields and Colm Ó Cíosóig formed My Bloody Valentine in early 1983 with lead vocalist David Conway. Conway, who performed under the pseudonym Dave Stelfox, suggested a number of potential band names, including the Burning Peacocks, before the trio settled on My Bloody Valentine. Shields has since claimed he was unaware that My Bloody Valentine was the title of a 1981 Canadian slasher film when the name was suggested. It's also a reference to the jazz standard My Funny Valentine.
- My Chemical Romance – Bassist Mikey Way, before joining the band, had a job at Barnes & Noble. The name came from Irvine Welsh's Ecstasy: Three Tales of Chemical Romance. Vocalist Gerard Way added the "My" to make the name more personal. It is also said to have been inspired from shoegaze band My Bloody Valentine.
- Miley Cyrus – Miley Cyrus's stage name evolved from a childhood nickname, "Smiley," which her family gave her because she smiled so much as an infant. Her father, Billy Ray Cyrus, began calling her "Smiley" due to her happy disposition. Over time, the nickname was shortened to "Miley". She used "Miley" professionally when she rose to fame on the Disney Channel show Hannah Montana, where she also played a character named Miley Stewart.

== N ==
- Napalm Death – The band's name originated in 1981 in Meriden, England, UK, as a deliberate anti-war statement created by founders Nic Bullen and Miles Ratledge. It was chosen to evoke the disgusting nature of warfare—specifically referencing the flammable, destructive substance used in the Vietnam War—fitting the band's initial punk-influenced, political ethos.
- The National Acrobat – The American hardcore punk band The National Acrobat, formed in Louisville in 1998, derived their name from the Black Sabbath song "A National Acrobat", which appears on the Sabbath Bloody Sabbath album by Black Sabbath. The band, featuring members who later played in Black Cross and Breather Resist, adopted the title to reflect a theme of refusing to follow orders or align with political agendas.
- Ned's Atomic Dustbin – Title of an episode of The Goon Show that the mother of vocalist Jonn Penney would read to him.
- New Model Army – From the standing army formed in 1645 by the Parliamentarians during the First English Civil War.
- New Order – The members of Joy Division had agreed that if any of them left the band for any reason, they would stop performing or recording under that name. After Ian Curtis hanged himself in May 1980, the other members were still interested in continuing but were at a loss for a new name. Their manager, Rob Gretton, saw a headline in The Guardian about "The New Order of Kampuchean Rebels" and suggested that. They preferred it to the alternative, The Witch Doctors of Zimbabwe, and eventually truncated it to New Order to sound less provocative.
- New York Dolls – The New York Dolls got their name in 1971 from guitarist Sylvain Sylvain, who was inspired by a children's toy repair shop called the New York Doll Hospital, located adjacent to a men's boutique where he worked on Lexington Avenue in Manhattan. Sylvain suggested the name because it represented something "broken and beautiful and alive all at once," matching the band’s gritty, cross-dressing fashion, and androgynous glam rock style that often featured platform heels and makeup. The name originally intended to be "The Dolls" or "The Dolls of New York" before settling on "New York Dolls" to capture the irony of a band delivering raw, rebellious rock while appearing like "street hustling tarts".
- Nickelback – The post-grunge band got their name from bassist Mike Kroeger, who frequently told customers, "Here's your nickel back," while working at a coffee shop. The phrase stuck, and after the band moved on from their original name, "Village Idiots," the nickname was adopted to represent the money returned in change, often for a $1.95 or $2.95 for coffee.
- Nine Inch Nails – Sole constant member Trent Reznor chose the name because it "could be abbreviated easily" and denied the name had any "literal meaning".
- Nine Stories (Lisa Loeb And...) – Named after the J.D. Salinger book of short stories of that name; Loeb, an English major, wanted a literary moniker.
- Nirvana – "I wanted a name that was kind of beautiful or nice and pretty instead of a mean, raunchy punk name like the Angry Samoans", Kurt Cobain later explained. A lawsuit by the similarly-named British band was settled out of court.

== O ==
- The Oak Ridge Boys – Formed in 1943 as country group Wally Fowler and the Georgia Clodhoppers, they performed for families in the restricted Oak Ridge National Laboratory that they soon renamed themselves the Oak Ridge Quartet. In 1961, they replaced "Quartet" with "Boys" because their producer thought the previous name sounded too old-fashioned.
- Oasis – Evolved from an earlier band called The Rain, composed of bassist Paul McGuigan, guitarist Paul Arthurs, drummer Tony McCarroll and singer Chris Hutton. Unsatisfied with Hutton, Arthurs auditioned acquaintance Liam Gallagher as a replacement. After Gallagher joined the group, the band's name was changed to Oasis, which was inspired by a place where Inspiral Carpets played, the Oasis Leisure Centre in Swindon.
- Odesza – the band's name was taken from the name of Harrison Mills' uncle's sunken vessel, which itself was named after the Ukrainian city of Odesa. Only his uncle and one other crew mate survived. Since the spelling "Odessa" was already being used by a Scottish synth band, they instead chose to use a form of the Hungarian spelling, replacing the "ss" with "sz". The correct spelling in Hungarian is Odessza.
- The Offspring – after a B-movie called The Offspring: They Were Born to Kill. Until 1986 the band was named Manic Subsidal.
- Of Mice & Men – After the novel by John Steinbeck. Steinbeck himself took the name from a line in the poem "To A Mouse" by Robert Burns, which reads "The best-laid schemes o' mice an 'men Gang aft agley"
- Ohio Players – A double meaning that refers to both musicianship and the members' view of themselves as attractive to women.
- Oingo Boingo — Shortened from Mystic Knights of the Oingo Boingo, itself inspired by the Mystic Knights of the Sea secret society on the Amos 'n' Andy TV series, when Danny Elfman reformed the band with change in direction from the musical comedy and theater of Richard Elfman to straightforward punk-inspired rock.
- One Ok Rock – Comes from "one o'clock", the time that the band used to practice on weekends, but due to the Japanese language making no distinction between R's and L's, they changed "O'CLOCK" to "O'CROCK" (or "O'KROCK"), which was then separated to become "OK ROCK".
- Opeth – Derived from the word "Opet", taken from the Wilbur Smith novel Sunbird. In this novel, Opet is the name of a (fictional) Phoenician city in South Africa whose name is translated as "City of the Moon" in the book.
- Orchestral Manoeuvres in the Dark – Chosen from a list of lyric and song-title ideas on Andy McCluskey's bedroom wall. The duo liked it because they wanted to avoid being seen as a punk act; they did not consider the name a serious choice since they only intended at the time to use it for one gig. McCluskey regrets that the band was stuck with "such a very silly name".
- The Outfield – Founder John Spinks had originally named his band the Baseball Boys, after the Baseball Furies gang in the film The Warriors. It was partly a joke, meant to draw some attention in the London club scene, but after the band's American-influenced sound got audiences' attention and a record deal, they began to focus on the US market. Their American manager persuaded them to change their name to The Outfield, still reflecting the original name but sounding less contrived.
- Owl City – Adam Young has attributed the name to a variety of sources: Ambrose Bierce's short story "An Occurrence at Owl Creek Bridge" (more specifically its short film adaptation ), since he identifies with the protagonist, his sister's pet owl, one that died after crashing into his father's truck, and a visit to Scotland where he saw many owls in a forest one evening.

== P ==
- Pablo Cruise – Many fans assumed that was the name of one of the bandmembers, which led them to say "the one in the middle" when asked which of the four it was. They have explained that "Pablo represents an honest, real, down-to-earth individual and Cruise depicts his fun-loving and easygoing attitude towards life", meant to be the sort of person they made music for. Casey Kasem claimed that the band's name originated with a drifter.
- Panic! at the Disco – Lifted from the lyrics of a song called "Panic", by Name Taken: "Panic at the disco/Sat back and took it so slow."
- Paramore – According to lead singer Hayley Williams, the name "Paramore" came from the maiden name of the mother of one of their first bass players. Once the group learned the meaning of the homophone paramour ("secret lover"), they decided to adopt the name, using the Paramore spelling.
- Paris Match – From the title of a song by The Style Council.
- Parliament-Funkadelic – The band grew from George Clinton's original doo-wop group, The Parliaments, named for the cigarette brand. During a brief period in the late 1960s when Clinton lost the rights to the name, he assembled a new, more rock-oriented touring, Funkadelic, a name suggested by bassist Billy Nelson. After Clinton regained the rights to the Parliaments, the two bands toured together, eventually performing as one under the merged name.
- Passion Pit – The band culled their name from the Variety Slanguage Dictionary, a glossary of Variety's frequently used slang, which was provided by the Hollywood insider publication to help not-so-savvy readers decipher its content. The magazine used the term to refer to drive-in theatres, because of their privacy and romantic allure for teenagers.
- Pearl Jam – The band's first name was "Mookie Blaylock" after the All-Star basketball player, but the name was changed to "Pearl Jam" due to trademark concerns. Vocalist Eddie Vedder claimed in an early interview that the name was a reference to his great-grandmother Pearl Brunner. In 2006 guitarist Mike McCready said that bass player Jeff Ament came up with "Pearl" and that "Jam" was added after seeing Neil Young live.
- Pet Shop Boys – From friends who worked in a pet shop in Ealing, and were known as the "pet shop boys".
- Phantogram – Formerly known as Charlie Everywhere, they wanted to change their name to "something [they] liked". They came up with the word 'phantogram' and thought it was interesting. Upon looking it up and finding it referred to an optical illusion, they found parallels with their band and music.
- Phish – A portmanteau of drummer Jon Fishman's nickname "Fish" and "phshhhh", an onomatopoetic representation of the sound of a brush on a snare drum. Fishman, however, says it really comes from the sound of an airplane taking off.
- Piirpauke – Comes from the Karelian father of founding member Sakari Kukko, means a noise or a racket.
- Pilot – The name came from the last initials of the founding members of the band, David Paton (lead vocals/bass), Billy Lyall (keyboards), and Stuart Tosh (drums). In an interview with David Paton, he said that the idea came from the producer's girlfriend. While Ian Bairnson was involved with the band's first album, he was not an official member of the band until their second album, Second Flight.
- Pink — Alecia Moore has given different accounts of how she got her stage name. Both go back to her childhood and come from the exposure of her vulva, either voluntarily or involuntarily. From its color she got the nickname Mr. Pink from Steve Buscemi's character in the film Reservoir Dogs; she dropped the honorific when she began performing in her teens.
- Pink Floyd – Playing under multiple names, including "Tea Set", when the band found themselves on the same bill as another band with the same name, Syd Barrett came up with the alternative name The Pink Floyd Sound, after two blues musicians, Pink Anderson and Floyd Council. For a time after this they oscillated between The Tea Set and The Pink Floyd Sound, with the latter name eventually winning out. The Sound was dropped fairly quickly, but the definite article was still used regularly until 1970. The group's UK releases during the Syd Barrett era credited them as The Pink Floyd as did their first two U.S. singles. The albums More and Ummagumma (both 1969) credit the band as Pink Floyd, produced by The Pink Floyd, while Atom Heart Mother (1970) credits the band as The Pink Floyd, produced by Pink Floyd. David Gilmour is known to have referred to the group as The Pink Floyd as late as 1984.
- Pixies – Selected randomly from a dictionary by guitarist Joey Santiago. The band took a liking to the word's definition, "mischievous little elves". The name was shortened from the original "Pixies In Panoply".
- +44 – Pronounced "plus forty four", a reference to the international dialing code of the United Kingdom, where band members Mark Hoppus and Travis Barker first discussed the project.
- Poco – Changed following litigation from Walt Kelly, creator of the Pogo comic strip, the name they had originally used.
- The Pogues – Originally called Póg mo Thóin–Irish for "Kiss my arse". Shortened to The Pogues after complaints received by the BBC.
- Poliça – According to singer Channy Leaneagh, Poliça is Polish for "policy", and she sees it as a reference to an unwritten code that guides the members when they play together, as well as its work ethic. (Contrary to this explanation, the Polish word for "policy" is actually polityka.) In another interview, Leaneagh claimed that they wanted something unique, and she had a file on her computer which, following a corruption during a computer crash, had come back as "Poliça".
- Popeda – an intentional misspelling of the name of the iconic Soviet car GAZ-M20 Pobeda.
- Porno for Pyros – Inspired by the 1992 Los Angeles riots. Perry Farrell has said, however, that the idea originally came from seeing an advertisement for fireworks in a pornographic magazine.
- Portishead – After the English town of Portishead, Somerset, the hometown of one of the band's founding members, Geoff Barrow.
- The Postal Service – Chosen because of the band's production method: producer Jimmy Tamborello would mail raw versions to vocalist Ben Gibbard, who would edit them and mail them back through the United States Postal Service.
- Procol Harum – From the pedigree name of a Siamese cat that belonged to a friend of Guy Stevens, the band's manager. The name was Procul Harum, which is Latin for "beyond these things", but was written down incorrectly by Keith Reid. The band would say in interviews that the cat was a Burmese Blue, though all cats with the name are the Devon Rex breed.
- The Prodigy – Bandleader Liam Howlett's first synthesiser was a Moog Prodigy.
- The Psychedelic Furs – It took the band some time to settle on this from several names they had been using. They chose it to distinguish themselves from the era's punk bands who frequently disparaged 1960s bands and musical trends.
- Public Image Ltd. – After leaving the Sex Pistols, John Lydon named his new band after Muriel Spark's novel The Public Image, adding the "Ltd." shortly afterward when the band was formally incorporated.

== Q ==
- Quarterflash – From "a quarter flash and three-quarters foolish", an Australian expression for new immigrants which the band found in a book at producer John Boylan's house.
- Queen – Were originally called Smile. Singer Freddie Mercury came up with the new name for the band, later saying: "Years ago I thought up the name 'Queen' ... It's just a name, but it's very regal obviously, and it sounds splendid ... It's a strong name, very universal and immediate. It had a lot of visual potential and was open to all sorts of interpretations. I was certainly aware of gay connotations, but that was just one face of it."
- Queensrÿche – Were originally called "The Mob". The name is derived from a song on their EP "Queen of the Reich", and is the only known use of the letter Y with an umlaut in English. It was used to soften "Queensreich" and not confuse the band with Nazism.
- Qntal – In a dream, vocalist Sigrid Hausen saw the letters in flames.
- Quiet Riot – Kevin DuBrow, upon joining the band, suggested the name, a variation of "Quite Right", a phrase Status Quo guitarist Rick Parfitt had suggested would make a good band name.

== R ==
- Radiohead – Originally known as "On a Friday", the band was given two weeks after signing to Parlophone to change their name. The band renamed themselves after the 1986 Talking Heads song "Radio Head" on the album True Stories, claiming it was the "least annoying song" on the album.
- Rage Against the Machine – When the band formed in 1991, they chose the name of a song Zack de la Rocha had written for his old band, Inside Out.
- Rammstein – The band was named after the 1988 Ramstein air show disaster. At first, the band had denied this and said that their name was inspired by the giant doorstop type devices found on old gates, called Rammsteine. The extra "m" in the band's name makes it translate literally as "ramming stone".
- The Ramones – Paul McCartney used the alias Paul Ramone when booking hotel rooms. So the band decided to use the last name Ramone even though it is not their surname.
- The Rascals – Originally known as Them, the band realized they had to change their name when they learned of the similarly-named Irish band featuring Van Morrison. Comedian Soupy Sales helped them come up with The Rascals. A year later their manager renamed them The Young Rascals, possibly because all the members were under 25, after another band with "Rascals" in their name objected.
- Rat Scabies – The Damned's drummer Christopher Millar got his nickname during an audition for London SS. He was suffering from scabies at the time, and a rat ran across the floor.
- Ratt – Called Crystal Pystal at their founding, they became Mickey Ratt a couple of years later, soon shortened to just Ratt.
- R.E.M. – Vocalist Michael Stipe drew the initialism randomly out of the dictionary. The term refers to the rapid eye movement phase of sleep. Stipe, however, says that is not the reason why the band is named R.E.M.
- REO Speedwagon – On the day the band, then students at the University of Illinois, began considering what to call themselves, founding member Neal Doughty recalled having walked into a class on the history of transportation that he was taking and seeing the name "REO Speed Wagon", an early 20th-century truck built by the Ransom E. Olds Company (later Oldsmobile), written on the blackboard. The new band took it as their name, although they chose to pronounce the "REO" by saying each letter's name individually, rather saying it as "Rio", as the maker had.
- Relient K – Named after the car that guitarist Matt Hoopes drove in high school, a Plymouth Reliant K car. The spelling was intentionally altered to avoid a lawsuit.
- The Residents – In 1971 the group sent a reel-to-reel tape to Hal Halverstadt at Warner Brothers. Because the band had not included any name in the return address, the rejection slip was simply addressed to "The Residents". The members of the group then decided that this would be the name they would use, first becoming Residents Unincorporated, then shortening it to the current name.
- The Rolling Stones – From the Muddy Waters song, "Rollin' Stone".
- Johnny Rotten – Steve Jones gave the nickname to Sex Pistols' frontman John Lydon as a joking reference to his poor-quality teeth at their first session together.
- Roxy Music – When casting about for names, Bryan Ferry and Andy MacKay put together a list of names of old cinemas. Ferry liked "Roxy" for its "resonance". After finding out an American band was also using the name, they added the "Music">
- Rush – The band was in need to quickly find a name for themselves just before a gig, when John Rutsey's brother suggested: "Why don't you call your band Rush?".
- Russian Circles – Originally the title of their first piece, which was later called "Carpe". Russian Circles is a drill in hockey.

== S ==
- School of Seven Bells – A mythical South American pickpocket training academy.
- Scritti Politti: A modification of the Italian for "political writings" (which is properly scritti politici), chosen to pay homage to Italian Marxist Antonio Gramsci.
- Seether – Originally Saron Gas. The band was asked to change their name due to Saron Gas being a homophone of sarin gas, a deadly nerve agent. They became Seether in honor of Veruca Salt's song titled, "Seether".
- Sepultura – Means "Grave" in Portuguese. The name was chosen after co-founder Max Cavalera translated the lyrics to the Motörhead song "Dancing on Your Grave".
- Sevendust – After discovering their name Crawlspace was already taken, band bassist Vinnie Hornsby renamed the band after a brand of plant pesticide he found in his grandmother's garage named Sevin dust.
- The Sex Pistols – The band chose the name shortly before their first gig, combining Malcolm McLaren's boutique Sex with "Pistol" not in the sense of a weapon but "a pin-up, a young thing, a better-looking assassin" as McLaren, who was not present when the name was chosen, put it later.
- Shai Hulud – After the gigantic Sandworms of Arrakis from the 1984 science fiction film Dune, based on the Frank Herbert science fiction novel of the same name.
- Sigue Sigue Sputnik – The group's name is a very rough translation of the Russian phrase "burn, burn Sputnik" or "burn, burn, satellite" and is claimed by the band to be an adaptation of the name of a Russian street gang. The name is also a nod to the band's anti-conventional rock image; in a 1986 interview, band founder Tony James remembered reading that, after seeing Sputnik pass over the earth, Little Richard gave up rock and roll. James "took that as a good omen" for the band's name choice.
- Sigur Rós – After the little sister of the band's vocalist, Jón Þór Birgisson (Jónsi), whose name is Sigurrós (without a space). It translates to "victory rose".
- Silver Apples – Taken from the W. B. Yeats poem "The Song of Wandering Aengus", which references "The silver apples of the moon, the golden apples of the sun."
- Silverchair – Originally said to be a combination of a misspelling of Nirvana's "Sliver" and You Am I's "Berlin Chair", but actually from the book by C. S. Lewis.
- Silversun Pickups – Derived from a liquor store located across from Silverlake Lounge in Los Angeles, where they often played in their early days. A band member would often arrive at the store late at night to buy liquor, making a "Silversun Pickup". In interviews, the band has said its name is more of "a state of mind".
- Gene Simmons – Born Chaim Witz in Israel, he began going by Gene Klein, his mother's maiden name, when he moved with her to the U.S. as a teenager. He has variously said his stage name is a tribute to rockabilly great Jumpin' Gene Simmons or actress Jean Simmons.
- Siouxsie and the Banshees – When the band was hastily formed to fill a vacancy in an early punk festival, Susan Ballion took the stage name Siouxsie Sioux, respelling her given name to use the North American Indian nation's name as an expression of disgust for cowboys and adding it as a surname. Steven Severin and the band took the name the Banshees from the 1970 horror film Cry of the Banshee.
- Sixpence None the Richer – Inspired by a line in C.S. Lewis's Mere Christianity.
- Slade – Having performed for years as the 'N Betweens, the band was offered a record deal if they changed their name. After some reluctance, they took "Ambrose Slade" at first from the names the label's A&R man's secretary gave to her bag and shoes respectively, eventually shortening it to just Slade.
- Slayer – A popular misconception has it that the band drew its name from the film Dragonslayer. "It's a myth to this day" says guitarist Kerry King. Original drummer Dave Lombardo says the band had almost settled on Wings of Fire until Slayer seemed like a better alternative.
- Sleigh Bells – Guitarist Derek Miller wrote "Sleigh Bells" on CD-Rs he distributed his demos on, before forming the band.
- Slint – The band took their name from drummer Britt Walford's pet fish.
- Sloan – According to band member Jay Ferguson, the band's name refers to a friend's nickname. Their friend Jason Larsen was called "slow one" by his French-speaking boss, which with the French accent sounded more like "Sloan". The original agreement was that they could name the band after their friend's nickname as long as he was on the cover of their first album. As a result, it is Larsen who appears on the cover of Sloan's Peppermint EP.
- Sly and the Family Stone – Founder Sylvester Stewart got the nickname "Sly" after a classmate misspelled his name in fifth grade. By the mid-1960s, when he began a career as a radio disc jockey, he had started using "Stone" as his professional last name. His first band, Sly and the Stoners, led to the formation of Sly Brothers and Sisters, which became Sly and the Family Stone after its first concert.
- Small Faces – At the time of the band's formation, a "face" was mod slang for someone who was a leader within the group, standing out from the crowd as a sharp dresser, successful with women, always knowing what the best new bands were and generally attracting other mods' attention. The founding members were short, hence the "small" modifier. Later on, when the taller Rod Stewart and Ronnie Wood joined the band, they became just the Faces.
- Smash Mouth — From the style of play-calling in gridiron football that relies heavily on running the ball up the middle at the heart of the opposing team's defense.
- The Smiths – Morrissey chose the name because it suggested ordinariness and "I thought it was time the ordinary people of the world showed their face."
- Soft Machine – From the novel by William S. Burroughs. after the group performed under several other names including the Four Skins.
- Soundgarden – The band took their name from a huge pipe sculpture in Seattle's Sand Point titled "A Sound Garden".
- The Soup Dragons – The early 70s animation "Clangers" had a character named the Soup Dragon, who would harvest Green Soup from a volcano.
- The Specials – Founded as the Automatics, later the Coventry Automatics, they became The Special AKA following a lineup change and another band called the Automatics signing a record contract. By the time they got their own record contract, they had become just The Specials.
- Spice Girls – From "Sugar and Spice", a song the band wrote in a songwriting class their manager insisted they take.
- Squeeze – The group performed under several names, most frequently "Captain Trundlow's Sky Company" or "Skyco", before settling on the band name "Squeeze" as a facetious tribute to the Velvet Underground's oft-derided 1973 album Squeeze.
- Squirrel Nut Zippers – A peanut and caramel candy from the 1920s.
- Stabbing Westward – Christopher Hall and Walter Flakus formed the band Stabbing Westward when they were in college. They came up with the name while working at the college radio station WIUS-FM. During an interview in 1996, Hall stated, "Since we went to Western Illinois University, Stabbing Westward had a certain 'kill everybody in the school' vibe to it! The school's way out in farm country and the country is really close minded. I was walking around like Robert Smith with real big hair, big baggy black clothes, black fingernail polish and eye makeup. They just didn't get it. We hated the town."
- Paul Stanley – When he joined KISS on the verge of the band's first album, Stanley Eisen jumped at the chance to use a name other than the birth name he had always hated, and because it was better for marketing purposes. Paul Stanley has been his legal name since then.
- Steely Dan – A dildo in the novel Naked Lunch by William S. Burroughs.
- Steen1 – The artist originally chose Steen Christensen as his artist name after the Danish criminal who shot and killed two police officers in Finland (the artist is unrelated to the criminal), but later changed it to Steen1 because of too much controversy.
- Steppenwolf – Gabriel Mekler suggested the name of Hermann Hesse's novel when he persuaded John Kay to re-form The Sparrows.
- Stereolab – Named after the electronic music division of Vanguard Records, a publisher of classical, folk, and jazz records.
- Sting – Gordon Sumner gained his nickname after his habit of wearing a black and yellow jumper with hooped stripes with the Phoenix Jazzmen. Bandleader Gordon Solomon thought he looked like a bee (or according to Sting himself, "they thought I looked like a wasp"), which prompted the name "Sting".
- The Stone Roses – John Squire came up with the name, liking the concept of two very different things. The band says that contrary to some accounts it has nothing to do with The Rolling Stones or a previous "English Roses" name.
- Stone Temple Pilots – Came out of the band members of what was then Mighty Joe Young, having found out that a blues musician also used the name, coming up with versions of what the "STP" in the STP Motor Oil name might stand for that they could use.
- Strawberry Switchblade – James Kirk of Orange Juice had considered using the name for a fanzine. Rose McDowall used it for the band she started because she thought it was too good not to use.
- Strawbs — Originally the Strawberry Hill Boys, after the Foggy Mountain Boys and Earl Taylor and the Stoney Mountain Boys, and the band living in London's Strawberry Hill neighborhood. For a 1967 show where the band wanted their name on a banner behind the stage, they shortened it to the Strawbs, which they kept afterwards, coinciding with their stylistic move from bluegrass to folk-pop.
- Stray Cats – To fool club owners who would not hire the same band on consecutive nights, the band kept changing their name but always ended it in "Cats" so fans would know who the band really was. After becoming successful as the Stray Cats in 1983 they used that name exclusively.
- The String Cheese Incident – The band initially called themselves the Blue String Cheese Band, because they played bluegrass music and also cheesy cover songs. After an incident in which there was a large food fight during happy hour at a Mexican restaurant in Crested Butte, Colorado, they changed their name to the String Cheese Incident.
- Joe Strummer – John Graham Mellor started going by this name as the rhythm guitarist for The 101ers, insisting it be used offstage as well. He kept it when he joined The Clash.
- Stryper – Originally derived from the King James Version of Isaiah 53:5, drummer Robert Sweet created the acronym: Salvation Through Redemption, Yielding Peace, Encouragement, and Righteousness.
- Styx – After having performed as first Tradewinds, the band became TW4 to avoid confusion with another band with the same name. They decided to change their name again after finally getting a record contract. Several suggestions were made. The band settled on Styx, the name of an underground river in Greek mythology, because according to Dennis DeYoung it was the only one that no one objected to.
- Sugarloaf – Before the band signed as Chocolate Hair could release their first album, the record label's legal department suggested that name might be seen as racist. They chose Sugarloaf from the name of a mountain near Boulder, Colorado, where one member lived.
- Sum 41 – The band started 41 days into the summer. The band was originally a NOFX cover band named Kaspir; they changed their name to Sum 41 for a Supernova show on September 28, 1996.
- The Sundays – The only suggested name all the members could agree on.
- Supertramp – From The Autobiography of a Super-Tramp by W.H. Davies.
- The Supremes – After several years of hanging around Hitsville U.S.A. and contributing hand claps and backing vocals to songs by other Motown artists, the Primettes (a play on the Primes, one of the predecessor bands to the Temptations) convinced Berry Gordy to sign them. He insisted, however, that they change their name, and they came up with the similarly-themed Supremes from a list of suggestions.
- The Sweet – Signed under their original name of The Sweetshop, they shortened it weeks before their first record was released after finding out another band had the same name.

== T ==
- Television – Both a reference to the medium and the phrase "tell a vision".
- The Temptations – After the Elgins were signed to Motown's subsidiary Miracle Records in 1961, Berry Gordy told the group that he had another group signed under that name and they needed to change it. Otis Williams, Paul Williams and songwriter Mickey Stevens were sitting around on the steps of Hitsville U.S.A. considering a new name, when Miracle executive Billy Mitchell suggested The Temptations.
- Ten Years After – The band was formed in 1966, ten years after the breakthrough of Elvis Presley, whom guitarist Alvin Lee was a huge fan of.
- Thee Michelle Gun Elephant – A friend of the band mispronounced the name of The Damned's album Machine Gun Etiquette.
- Therapy? – The band chose the name because it was a simple word that everyone knows. The reason for the question mark at the end of the name was because when lead singer and guitarist Andy Cairns was writing out the spines for the cassettes to send off to the record companies, he began writing too far to the left, so to centre the writing and make it look more professional, he added a question mark to the end and it stuck with the band.
- They Might Be Giants – The name of a 1971 film, in which George C. Scott plays a man who believes he is Sherlock Holmes. The film's title is in turn a reference to the literary character Don Quixote, who mistook windmills for giants. The name had previously been used by a ventriloquist friend of the band.
- Thin Lizzy – From Tin Lizzie, a robot character in the British comic book series The Dandy. The spelling was modified as a joke on the Dublin accent, where initial "th" sounds are often pronounced as "t".
- This Mortal Coil – A loose collective of artists signed to Britain's 4AD label, whose founder, Ivo Watts-Russell, took the name from Spirit's "Dream Within A Dream": "Stepping off this mortal coil will be my pleasure". The phrase originates in the "To be, or not to be" soliloquy in Hamlet: "For in that sleep of death, what dreams may come, / When we have shuffled off this mortal coil,/ Must give us pause."
- Three Dog Night – According to The Three Dog Night Story, 1964–1975, vocalist Danny Hutton's then-girlfriend June Fairchild suggested the name after reading a magazine article about indigenous Australians, in which it was explained that on cold nights they would customarily sleep in a hole in the ground whilst embracing a dingo, a native species of wild dog. On colder nights they would sleep with two dogs and if the night were freezing, it was a "three dog night". However, Van Dyke Parks, an arranger at the band's record label, claimed online in 2018 that Fairchild never read the magazine and was thus unaware of the story, while he was, and suggested the name.
- Thompson Twins – From Thomson and Thompson, the bumbling detectives in Hergé's comic strip series The Adventures of Tintin.
- Toad the Wet Sprocket – In Eric Idle's monologue "Rock Notes" (heard on Monty Python's Contractual Obligation Album), a journalist reports that "Rex Stardust, lead electric triangle with Toad the Wet Sprocket, has had to have a elbow removed following their recent successful worldwide tour of Finland."
- Tokio Hotel – After "Tokio", the German spelling of the Japanese city Tokyo, due to the band's love of the city, and "Hotel" due to their constant touring and living in hotels.
- Tom Tom Club – Named for the dancehall in The Bahamas where the musicians involved rehearsed for the first time.
- Tonstartssbandht – Named because of a word collage by one of the band members.
- Toto – In the early 1980s, band members told the press that the band was named after the dog in The Wizard of Oz. They said they had used it to label their original demo tapes, meaning to choose another name later. They have also said it is the Anglicized version of original lead singer Bobby Kimball's real last name, Toteaux, or that it comes from the Latin toto ("all"), expressing their desire to embrace a wide variety of musical styles.
- Traffic – Jim Capaldi came up with the name while the band were waiting to cross a street in Dorchester; it has nothing to do with drugs despite later rumors.
- The Tragically Hip – From a skit in the Michael Nesmith movie Elephant Parts.
- Turo's Hevi Gee – Originally named "Turo's Hevi Gentlemen" after Pedro Hietanen's band Pedro's Heavy Gentlemen, later changed to "Turo's Hevi Gee" on Hietanen's suggestion, to avoid confusion.
- The Turtles – Originally the band called themselves "The Tyrtles", hoping the intentional misspelling would be as distinctive for them as it had been for the Beatles and the Byrds, but it was not, so they reverted to the correct spelling.
- Two Door Cinema Club – Came about after band member Sam Halliday mispronounced the name of the local cinema, Tudor Cinema, and this stuck.
- Type O Negative - The name comes from the band's frontman Peter Steele's blood type, and to refer to the band's dark and negative themes.

== U ==
- Midge Ure — Born James, he got his nickname in the first band he was in, Salvation, led by bassist Jim McGinlay. To avoid confusion, McGinlay said there could only be one "Jim" in the band and reversed it to "Midge" for Ure, a playful joke on Ure being short.

== V ==
- Van Halen – The last name of the band's lead guitarist Eddie Van Halen and drummer Alex Van Halen. Although initially called Mammoth, the band changed its name when it found out Mammoth was already taken by another band.
- Vanilla Fudge – Upon being signed to Atlantic Records in 1967, Ahmet Ertegun told the band that he did not like their name at that time, The Pigeons, and that they had to change it. They could not think of a new name, until Carmine Appice discussed the problem with a woman who worked at a club the band was playing. She suggested her grandfather's childhood nickname for, Vanilla Fudge, which immediately suggested to Appice the band's blue-eyed soul style. The rest of the band and Ertegun also accepted the new name.
- The Velvet Underground – After a book about sadomasochism by Michael Leigh.
- Tom Verlaine – Tom Miller took the last name of the French Symbolist poet when beginning his musical career because he liked the way it sounded, not to make any artistic statement.
- Veruca Salt – After the character from the children's novel, Charlie and the Chocolate Factory.
- Sid Vicious – Johnny Rotten's nickname for his Sex Pistols bandmate Simon Ritchie after Ritchie was bitten by Rotten's pet hamster, Syd.
- Village People – The band's producer and its first two members met at a party in the Greenwich Village neighborhood of the New York City borough of Manhattan. The name more broadly reflects the band's roots in the gay subculture strongly identified with that area.
- The Villebillies – From a lyric written by vocalist Derek "Child" Monyhan shortly after joining the group. It is a combination of the words Louisville, the band's hometown and largest urban center in Kentucky (often locally nicknamed "The Ville"), and hillbilly, referring to eastern Kentucky's rural mountain culture. The name references the cross genre nature of the band's music.
- Violent Femmes – Brian Ritchie made up the name in response to another previous bandmate's question as to what band his brother was in. When Ritchie and Victor DeLorenzo began their own group, they liked the name and decided to use it.

== W ==
- Bob Marley and the Wailers – Originally the Teenagers, they became the Wailing Rudeboys, then the Wailing Wailers and finally the Wailers.
- Wall of Voodoo – A friend of Stan Ridgway came up with the band's name, derived from Phil Spector's "Wall of Sound" production style. "Wall of Voodoo seemed to describe best what we were doing", recalled Ridgway.
- Wang Chung — Nick Feldman came across the Chinese term huang chung (黃鐘, pinyin: huáng zhōng; Wade–Giles: huang chung) in a book, meaning "yellow bell" and denoting the first note of the Chinese classical music scale.
- The Weather Girls – A play on "It's Raining Men", the single they released after deciding to change their name from Two Tons.
- The Weavers – From Gerhart Hauptmann's 1892 play about the 1844 Silesian weavers' uprising.
- The Weeknd – Chosen in tribute to when the artist dropped out of school, took his mattress, "left one weekend and never came home". The last "e" was excluded to avoid trademark problems with pop rock band the Weekend.
- Wet Leg – In an interview with Diffus posted on YouTube in April 2022, the band stated that their name came from an Isle of Wight epithet to describe non-locals on the island; those who had crossed the Solent to reach the isle were said to have a wet leg from getting off the boat.
- The Who – Were originally called The Detours, then changed their name to The Who after a suggestion by guitarist Pete Townshend's friend Richard Barnes. Their first manager, Pete Meaden, renamed them The High Numbers, and they released one unsuccessful single, "Zoot Suit", under that name. When EMI dropped them, the band sacked Meaden and went back to being called The Who. Another possible reason was because of Townshend's grandmother, who would always refer to popular bands as "The Who?", due to her impaired hearing.
- Widespread Panic – Due to anxiety problems, lead guitarist Mike Houser used to have the nickname "Panic". One day he came home and announced that he did not want to be just "Panic", he wanted to be "Widespread Panic".
- Wilco – After the CB radio Radiotelephony procedure for "Will Comply", a choice which lead singer and guitarist Jeff Tweedy has called "fairly ironic for a rock band to name themselves."
- A Wilhelm Scream – The Wilhelm scream is a frequently used film and television stock sound effect first used in 1951 for the film Distant Drums. The band were previously named 'Koen' and then 'Smackin Isaiah' before finally settling on the current appellation.
- Will to Power – A dance music band from Miami, Florida whose name is taken from Nietzsche's concept in philosophy
- Wolfmother – Based on the Tom Robbins novel Skinny Legs and All, which repeatedly mentions "the room of the wolfmother wallpaper."
- The Wiggles – Anthony Field took the name from "Get Ready to Wiggle", a song recorded by The Cockroaches, his former band, since to him it described the way young children dance.
- The Wombats – The band members used to jokingly call each other wombats; when they needed a name for the promotional materials for their first gig, guitarist Dan Haggis suggested "The Wombats".
- Stevie Wonder – Born Stevland Hardaway Judkins, producer Clarence Paul gave him the stage name Little Stevie Wonder when he signed his first Motown contract at 11. Judkins later legally changed his name to Morris, and by the mid-1960s had dropped the "Little" from his stage name.
- Woodhands – Member Dan Werb chose the name because he "wanted to let everyone know that there was an organic element to the ambient electronic music I was making."
- Wu-Tang Clan – RZA and Ol' Dirty Bastard adopted the name for the rap group after seeing the Kung fu film Shaolin and Wu Tang, which features a school of warriors trained in Wu-Tang style.

== X ==
- X Japan – The band added "Japan" in order to distinguish from the American punk group X.
- XTC – From Jimmy Durante exclaiming "I'm in ecstasy!" in his song "I'm the Guy who Found the Lost Chord". It was written that way to stand out in print.
- Xiu Xiu – From the 1998 Chinese film Xiu Xiu: The Sent Down Girl.

== Y ==
- The Yardbirds – Grew out of Keith Relf's The Metropolitan Blues Quartet. When the band changed members in 1963, Relf changed the name to The Yardbirds, partly from the nickname of jazz saxophonist Charlie Parker, "Bird", and partly from the American slang for prisoner.
- Yazoo – Singer Alison Moyet, a blues enthusiast, chose the name in honor of Yazoo Records, an American label that focused on the genre. Since the label threatened to sue the duo for trademark infringement, and there was also already an American band named Yazoo, the group went by Yaz in North America.
- Yellow Magic Orchestra – The members had previously been part of Harry Hosono and the Yellow Magic Band, a name that spoofed the kind of languid, mellow Hawaiian music popular in the U.S.
- Yes – Group members were searching for an appropriate name but needed a name to play their first gig under. They played their first gig on August 3 under the name Yes, suggested by Peter Banks as being short, positive, direct, and memorable. It was originally intended as a temporary solution until a permanent name could be found.
- Yo La Tengo – The name is a reference to a story about the 1962 US Major League Baseball expansion team, the New York Mets. When two players chase the same batted fly ball, customarily one yells "I've got it" and the other then retreats to avoid a collision. But infielder Elio Chacón did not understand the English term, so he and outfielder Richie Ashburn collided a few times while chasing fly balls. Another teammate suggested that Ashburn yell the words in Spanish instead–"yo la tengo"–so Chacón would understand. After that Ashburn and Chacón no longer ran into each other. But another teammate, Frank Thomas, did not understand the Spanish term. So one day while chasing a fly ball, despite hearing Ashburn call out "yo la tengo", Howard ran into Ashburn.
- Youth – Killing Joke's bassist Martin Glover took his stage name in honor of Jamaican deejay Big Youth.

== Z ==
- Zebra – The band took the name after seeing a photograph of a woman riding a zebra on the cover of Vogue.
- Zedd – Anton Zaslavski derived his stage name from the English "zed" for the first letter of his last name.
- The Zombies – Changed from The Mustangs at Paul Arnold's suggestion, even though some members did not know what it meant, since it stood out more and was less likely that another band would have it.
- Billy Zoom – Before he cofounded X, Ty Kindell came up with his stage name to convince record labels to give his demos a second look.
- Zox – From the last name of drummer John Zox.
- Zao – Original vocalist Eric Reeder came up with this name, meaning "alive" in Greek.
- Zyklon-B – From the brand of gas used in the gas chambers of Auschwitz and other death camps during the Holocaust.
- ZZ Top – Billy Gibbons wrote in his autobiography Billy F Gibbons: Rock + Roll Gearhead that he used to live in an apartment decorated with several concert posters and flyers, including Z.Z. Hill and B.B. King. After playing around with names like Z.Z. King and B.B. Hill he ended up with ZZ Top.

== See also ==
- Lists of etymologies
- List of bands named after other performers' songs
- List of original names of bands
