= List of bands named after other performers' songs =

This is a list of bands whose names are taken from songs by other artists where both artists in question have articles on the English Wikipedia.

== Exact matches ==
- 10 Seconds of Forever, after Hawkwind's "10 Seconds of Forever"
- ABC, after the Jackson 5's "ABC"
- After Forever, after Black Sabbath's "After Forever"
- All That Remains, after Bolt Thrower's "All That Remains" from their album Realm of Chaos
- Bad Brains, after the Ramones' song "Bad Brain"
- Blasphemy, after Morbid Angel's "Blasphemy"
- Blonde Redhead, after the DNA song "Blonde Redhead"
- Boom Boom Satellites, after Sigue Sigue Sputnik's song "Boom Boom Satellite"
- Bonded by Blood, after Exodus's "Bonded by Blood"
- Boris, after Melvins' "Boris" from their album Bullhead
- Bury Your Dead, after the Haunted's "Bury Your Dead"
- Carnal Forge, after Carcass's "Carnal Forge" from their album Heartwork
- CC Cowboys, after Imperiet's "C.C. Cowboys" from their album Blå himlen blues
- Cocteau Twins, after Simple Minds' song "Cocteau Twins".
- Cold Beat, after "Cold Beat" by the Sound
- Communist Daughter, after Neutral Milk Hotel's "Communist Daughter"
- Cool Kids of Death, after Saint Etienne's "Cool Kids of Death" from their album Tiger Bay
- Dali's Car, after Captain Beefheart's "Dali's Car" from Trout Mask Replica
- A Day in the Life (now known as Hawthorne Heights), after the Beatles song "A Day in the Life".
- Death Cab for Cutie, after Bonzo Dog Doo-Dah Band's "Death Cab for Cutie" on their album Gorilla
- Deep Purple, after Peter DeRose's "Deep Purple" (most notably performed by Nino Tempo & April Stevens)
- Desperate Journalist, after the Cure's "Desperate Journalist in Ongoing Meaningful Review Situation"
- dEUS, after the Sugarcubes' "Deus"
- Dir En Grey, after Lareine's "Dir en gray"
- Dr. Feelgood (band), after Dr. Feelgood and the Interns's "Doctor Feel-Good"
- Ella Guru, after Captain Beefheart's "Ella Guru"
- Eric's Trip, after Sonic Youth's "Eric's Trip"
- Exciter, after Judas Priest's "Exciter"
- Famous Last Words, after My Chemical Romance's "Famous Last Words"
- Flume, after Bon Iver's "Flume"
- Fuck the Facts, after Naked City's "Fuck the Facts"
- Funeral for a Friend, after Planes Mistaken for Stars's "Funeral for a Friend"
- Gamma Ray, after "Gamma Ray" by German prog-rock band Birth Control
- Girlschool, from Paul McCartney's "Girls' School"
- Golden Earring, after the Hunters "Golden Earrings"
- Great Speckled Bird after Roy Acuff's "The Great Speckled Bird"
- Hanoi Rocks, after Johnny Thunders & the Heartbreakers' "Chinese Rocks"
- Head Like a Hole, after Nine Inch Nails' "Head Like a Hole"
- Heaven in Her Arms after Converge's "Heaven in Her Arms" from the album Jane Doe
- Hound Dog, after Elvis Presley's "Hound Dog"
- How to Destroy Angels, after Coil's "How to Destroy Angels"
- Hunters & Collectors, after Can's "Hunters and Collectors" from the Landed album
- In Fear and Faith, after Circa Survive's "In Fear and Faith"
- Indian Summer, after the Doors' "Indian Summer"
- Jet, after Wings' "Jet"
- Kashmir after Led Zeppelin's "Kashmir"
- The Kooks after David Bowie's song "Kooks"
- Ladytron, after Roxy Music's "Ladytron"
- Life Without Buildings, after the Japan song of the same name
- Little Birdy, after Ween's "Little Birdy" from the album Pure Guava
- The Living End, after the Stray Cats' "The Living End"
- Madness, after Prince Buster's "Madness"
- Man Overboard, after Blink-182's "Man Overboard"
- Misery Index, after Assück's "Misery Index"
- Mob Rules, after Black Sabbath's Mob Rules
- Mr. Big, after Free's "Mr. Big"
- Moonshake, after the Can song "Moonshake"
- Motörhead, after Hawkwind's song of the same name
- Motionless in White, after Eighteen Visions's "Motionless in White"
- Negativland, after Neu!'s "Negativland"
- Nickel Creek, after Byron Berline's "Nickel Creek"
- Nine Below Zero, after Sonny Boy Williamson II's "Nine Below Zero"
- Northlane, after Architects' 2008 song "North Lane"
- Overkill, after Motörhead's 1979 song "Overkill"
- The Ordinary Boys, after Morrissey's "The Ordinary Boys"
- Poison, after Kix's "Poison"
- Powderfinger, after Neil Young's "Powderfinger"
- Pretty Girls Make Graves, after the Smiths' song by the same name.
- The Pretty Things, after Bo Diddley's "Pretty Thing"
- Primary, after the Cure's song "Primary".
- Prophets of Rage, after Public Enemy's song of the same name
- Pulling Teeth, after Green Day's song by the same name.
- Radiohead, after Talking Heads' song "Radio Head"
- Rage, after Judas Priest's "Rage"
- Rage Against the Machine, after a song by former Zack de la Rocha's hardcore punk band Inside Out called "Rage Against the Machine"
- Regular John, after Queens of the Stone Age's "Regular John"
- Riders in the Sky, after Stan Jones's "(Ghost) Riders in the Sky".
- Riders on the Storm, after the Doors's "Riders on the Storm"
- Right Said Fred, after Bernard Cribbins' single by the same name
- Ripping Corpse, after Kreator's "Ripping Corpse"
- Roxette, after Dr. Feelgood's "Roxette"
- Ruins, after Henry Cow's "Ruins"
- Running Wild, after Judas Priest's "Running Wild"
- Santiano, after Hugues Aufray's "Santiano"
- Scary Kids Scaring Kids, after Cap'n Jazz's "Scary Kids Scaring Kids"
- Seagull Screaming Kiss Her Kiss Her, after XTC's "Seagulls Screaming Kiss Her Kiss Her"
- Seether, after Veruca Salt's "Seether"
- Shook Ones, after Mobb Deep's "Shook Ones"
- The Sisters of Mercy, from Leonard Cohen's "Sisters of Mercy"
- Slowdive, after Siouxsie and the Banshees's "Slowdive"
- Sinner, after Judas Priest's "Sinner"
- Suicide Commando, after No More's "Suicide Commando"
- The Sisters of Mercy, after Leonard Cohen's "Sisters of Mercy"
- Spiral Architect, after Black Sabbath's "Spiral Architect"
- Spoon, after Can's song "Spoon"
- Stars of Track and Field, after Belle and Sebastian's "Stars of Track and Field"
- Starsailor, after Tim Buckley's "Starsailor" from his album of the same name. The band's logo borrows the same typeface off the album's sleeve.
- Stiff Little Fingers, after the Vibrators's "Stiff Little Fingers"
- The Story So Far, after New Found Glory's "The Story So Far", a hidden track from the 2002 album Sticks and Stones
- Suffocation, after Morbid Angel's "Suffocation"
- Sweet Soul Music, after Arthur Conley's "Sweet Soul Music"
- Sweet Thing, after Van Morrison's "Sweet Thing"
- The Sunshine Underground, after the Chemical Brothers' "The Sunshine Underground"
- Teeth of Lions Rule the Divine, after Earth's "Teeth of Lions Rule the Divine"
- Textures, after Cynic's "Textures"
- Tiger Trap, after Beat Happening's "Tiger Trap"
- Triángulo de Amor Bizarro, after New Order's "Bizarre Love Triangle" (translated directly into Spanish)
- TV Girl, after Beat Happening's "T.V. Girl"
- Uh Huh Her, after PJ Harvey's unreleased song "Uh Huh Her" that was cut from the album Uh Huh Her
- Veil of Maya, after Cynic's "Veil of Maya"
- Velocity Girl, after Primal Scream's "Velocity Girl"
- Lola Montez, after Volbeat's "Lola Montez"
- Weakling, after Swans' "Weakling"
- Winter, after Amebix' "Winter"

== Bands named after other performers' albums ==
- Bonded by Blood, after Exodus's Bonded by Blood.
- Dixie Chicks, after Lowell George's Dixie Chicken
- Epica, after Kamelot's Epica album.
- Europe, after Deep Purple's Made in Europe.
- Heaven Shall Burn, after the Marduk album Heaven Shall Burn... When We Are Gathered.
- Masters of Reality, after a label misprint of Black Sabbath's Master of Reality
- Mountain, after Leslie West's Mountain
- Nick Cave and the Bad Seeds, after Mutiny/The Bad Seed, an EP by the Birthday Party
- Obscura, after Gorguts's Obscura.
- Overkill, after Motörhead's Overkill
- Squeeze, after the Velvet Underground's Squeeze album.
- Sticky Fingers, after the Rolling Stones' Sticky Fingers album.
- Teenage Head, after the Flaming Groovies' album.
- Volbeat, after Dominus's Vol.Beat.
- The Young Gods, after Swans' Young God.
- Iowa, after Slipknot's Iowa.

== Bands named after their own songs ==
- Bad Omens were originally named CHLDRN until Ash Advilsen, who founded Sumerian Records, suggested they rebrand as Bad Omens, the name of one of their earlier songs. The song was renamed to "Glass Houses".
- Black Sabbath took their name after writing the song of the same name, which in turn was named after the 1963 film of the same name.
- Blue Murder, after a song on their first album.
- Butthole Surfers, in the early years of band, they performed under a different name every show. In a gig, the announcer forgot their name so he used a title of one of their songs.
- The Chemical Brothers, after their song "Chemical Beats". Originally named the Dust Brothers but after production and songwriting duo of the same name complained they changed their name.
- The Cure, after their own unreleased song from prior to their first record, Easy Cure. They pulled song lyrics from a hat, and the lyric "Easy Cure" was chosen, from a song written by drummer Lol Tolhurst. Guitarist/Vocalist Robert Smith said of the decision to change it to the Cure, “Every other group we liked had 'The' in front of their name but The Easy Cure sounded stupid so we just changed it to The Cure instead."
- Dashboard Confessional, from the song "The Sharp Hint of New Tears"; "on the way home, this car hears my confessions/I think tonight I'll take the long way home..."
- The Get Up Kids, named from the title of a song by guitarist/vocalist Matt Pryor's previous band, Secular Theory, called "Suburban Get Up Kids"
- Icehouse, named after a Flowers song, Flowers changing their name to Icehouse thereafter.
- Jesu, named after the last song on Godflesh's album Hymns. Godflesh is the main project of band leader Justin Broadrick.
- Living in a Box, from their song and debut album of the same name.
- Motörhead after the song "Motorhead" which the band's founder and frontman Lemmy had written while still in Hawkwind, and a version by that band was also recorded, making this a rare example of a band named after one of their own songs, and also a song by another band.
- New Kids on the Block, from a song on their debut album.
- Nightwish, after a song by Tuomas Holopainen, it is from their demo released in 1996
- Queensrÿche, after a song composed by Chris DeGarmo called "Queen of the Reich", it is from Queensrÿche
- The Shins, after the Flake Music (a prior incarnation of the group) song of the same name
- Slipknot, after the first track on their demo album Mate. Feed. Kill. Repeat.
- Steeleye Span, after the character John "Steeleye" Span in the song "Horkstow Grange"; the song was the inspiration for the band's name, but they only got around to recording it 28 years after first forming.
- Talk Talk, Mark Hollis had originally written the song for his first group the Reaction, under the name "Talk Talk Talk Talk".
- Tin Machine, David Bowie side project named after the song "Tin Machine" on the eponymous album.

== Approximations, partial matches, and lyrics ==
- 801, after a lyric in Brian Eno's song "The True Wheel"
- A Certain Ratio, also after a lyric in "The True Wheel"
- All Time Low, after a line from New Found Glory's "Head on Collision" ("And it feels like/I'm at an all-time low")
- American Aquarium, after the Wilco song “I Am Trying To Break Your Heart”
- Angelspit, after the Sonic Youth song "Orange Rolls, Angel's Spit"
- Annisokay, after a line in Michael Jackson's Smooth Criminal: "Annie are you okay?"
- The Antlers, after the Microphones' "Antlers"
- at17, after Janis Ian's "At Seventeen"
- Bananarama, from Roxy Music's "Pyjamarama".
- Bathory, after Venom's "Countess Bathory"
- Between the Buried and Me, in the song "Ghost Train" by Counting Crows. The lyrics say "Fifty million feet of earth between the buried and me"
- Big Country, after a line in Roxy Music's "Prairie Rose": "Lonesome star, shine on the big country"
- Big Fat Snake, after a line in Bob Dylan's "Wiggle Wiggle": "Wiggle like a big fat snake"
- The Black Angels, after Velvet Underground's "The Black Angel's Death Song"
- Blue Merle from the line "There ain't no companion like a blue-eyed Merle" in "Bron-Y-Aur Stomp" by Led Zeppelin
- Boom Boom Satellites, after Sigue Sigue Sputnik's "Boom Boom Satellite" from their album Dress for Excess
- Boredoms, after Buzzcocks' "Boredom" from Spiral Scratch
- Boyz II Men, after New Edition's "Boys to Men"
- The Boy Least Likely To, after Morrissey's "The Girl Least Likely To
- Burning Airlines, after Brian Eno's "Burning Airlines Give You So Much More"
- A Certain Ratio, after a line from Brian Eno's "The True Wheel"
- Candlebox, after a line from Midnight Oil's "Tin Legs and Tin Mines": "boxed in like candles"
- Canned Heat, after Tommy Johnson's song "Canned Heat Blues" from 1928.
- Cast, after a line in the song "Looking Glass" by the La's, which originally featured Cast frontman John Power: "The change is cast".
- Cave In, after Codeine's "Cave-In"
- Celtic Frost, after Cirith Ungol's "Frost and Fire"
- Chappell Roan, after Curley Fletcher's "The Strawberry Roan"
- Con Funk Shun, after New Birth's "Con-Funk-Shun"
- Counterparts, after Alexisonfire's "Counterparts and Number Them", from their album Alexisonfire
- Crass, after a line in the David Bowie song "Ziggy Stardust" ("The kids was just crass")
- Curved Air, after Terry Riley's "A Rainbow in Curved Air"
- Deacon Blue, after Steely Dan's "Deacon Blues" on their album Aja
- Dead Boys, from a lyric in "Down in Flames", by Rocket from the Tombs
- DIIV, after Nirvana's "Dive"
- The Dixie Chicks after Little Feats "Dixie Chicken"
- Dizzy Mizz Lizzy, after Larry Williams' "Dizzy Miss Lizzy"
- Dovetail Joint, after a line in the Beatles' "Glass Onion"
- DumDum Boys, after Iggy Pop's "Dum Dum Boys"
- Dum Dum Girls, after Iggy Pop's "Dum Dum Boys" as well as the Vaselines album Dum Dum. May also be a reference to Talk Talk's "Dum Dum Girl".
- Electric Wizard, after Black Sabbath's "Electric Funeral" and "The Wizard"
- Everything Everything, after either Radiohead's "Everything in Its Right Place" or Underworld's "Cowgirl" (although these are just some of many name etymologies provided by the band).
- Felt, after a line (and lead singer Tom Verlaine's enunciation) in Television's "Venus": "How we fell...t"
- FireHouse, after Kiss's "Firehouse"
- A Flock of Seagulls, after a line in the Stranglers song "Toiler on the Sea"
- Gigolo Aunts, after Syd Barrett's "Gigolo Aunt"
- Girl in a Coma, after the Smiths' "Girlfriend in a Coma"
- Go-Kart Mozart, after a line in Bruce Springsteen's "Blinded By the Light": "Go-kart Mozart was checkin' out the weather chart to see if it was safe to go outside"
- Golden Earring, from the Hunters' "The Golden Earrings".
- Greenmachine, after Kyuss' "Green Machine"
- Hatebreed, after the Misfits' "Hatebreeders"
- Hello Goodbye, after the Beatles' "Hello, Goodbye"
- Les Hurlements d'Léo, after les VRP's "Léo"
- Judas Priest, after Bob Dylan's "The Ballad of Frankie Lee and Judas Priest"
- The Killers, after the name of the fictional band in the music video for the New Order song "Crystal".
- Knife Party, after Deftones' "Knife Prty"
- The Kooks, after David Bowie's "Kooks" from his album Hunky Dory
- Lady Gaga, after Queen's "Radio Ga Ga"
- The Lightning Seeds, after a misheard lyric from Prince's "Raspberry Beret" ("Thunder drowns out what the lightning sees")
- The Lilac Time, after a lyric in Nick Drake's song "Riverman"
- Local H, after R.E.M.'s songs: "Oddfellows Local 151" and "Swan Swan H"
- Lovebites, after Halestorm's "Love Bites (So Do I)"
- Mayhem, after Venom's "Mayhem with Mercy"
- Marching Church, after Rudimentary Peni's "When You Are A Martian Church"
- Metalucifer, after Sabbat's "Metalucifer and Evilucifer"
- Million Dead, after a line from Refused's "The Apollo Program Was a Hoax" ("Choke on the truth of a million dead")
- Mob Rules, after Black Sabbath's "The Mob Rules"
- the Mountain Goats after Screamin' Jay Hawkins' "Yellow Coat" (Fifty million bulldogs/Twenty mountain goats/All gathered 'round at sundown/To see my yellow coat)
- The Naked and Famous after Tricky's "Tricky Kid", which itself quotes the Presidents of the United States of America's "Naked and Famous"
- Nazareth after a line from the Band's "The Weight"; "I pulled into Nazareth, Was feelin' about half past dead..."
- Nazz after the Yardbirds' "The Nazz Are Blue"
- Nightmare of You after the Cure's "Kyoto Song", which starts off "A nightmare of you"
- Northlane, after the Architects song "North Lane"
- Oceansize after Jane's Addiction's "Ocean Size"
- Old 97's after G. B. Grayson and Henry Whitter's "Wreck of the Old 97"
- Panic! at the Disco from Name Taken's "Panic"
- Paris Match, after the Style Council's "The Paris Match"
- Peaches after Nina Simone's "Four Women" ("What do they call me? My name is Peaches")
- Pestilence, after Kreator's "The Pestilence"
- Pieces of a Dream, from "Pieces of Dreams", written by Michel Legrand and most notably performed by Peggy Lee.
- The Pretenders, after "The Great Pretender", by the Platters.
- Raveonettes, after Buddy Holly's "Rave On"
- Radio Birdman, from a misheard line in the Stooges' "1970" ("Radio burnin' up above")
- The Rifles (band), after the Jam's song "The Eton Rifles"
- The Rolling Stones, after Muddy Waters' "Rollin' Stone"
- Saint Vitus, after Black Sabbath's "St. Vitus Dance"
- Seagull Screaming Kiss Her Kiss Her after "Seagulls Screaming Kiss Her, Kiss Her" on XTC's album The Big Express
- Shakespears Sister, after the Smiths' "Shakespeare's Sister"
- Shinedown, after a line from Collective Soul's "Shine" ("Oh, heaven let your light shine down")
- Simple Minds, after a line from David Bowie's "The Jean Genie" ("He's so simple-minded, he can't drive his module")
- Sister Machine Gun, after a line from Skinny Puppy's "Tin Omen" ("Unbeknown one by one they'll be coming down/Altogether sister machine gun")
- Sodom, after Venom's "One Thousand Days in Sodom"
- Space, after the original working title of the Real People's "My Own Dream".
- Spider Murphy Gang, after lines from Elvis Presley's "Jailhouse Rock" ("Spider Murphy played the tenor saxophone/Little Joe was blowin' on the slide trombone/The drummer boy from Illinois went crash, boom, bang/The whole rhythm section was the Purple Gang")
- St. Vincent, after a line from Nick Cave and the Bad Seeds' "There She Goes, My Beautiful World" ("And Dylan Thomas died drunk in / St. Vincent's hospital") and Clark's great-grandmother.
- Stockton's Wing, after a line from Bruce Springsteen's "Backstreets" ("Slow dancing in the dark/On the beach at Stockton's Wing")
- Suburban Kids with Biblical Names, after a line from Silver Jews' "People" ("I love the city and the city rain/Suburban kids with Biblical names")
- Suede, after Suedehead by Morrissey.
- Superjoint Ritual, after a lyric in Darktone's "The Pagan Winter"
- Taking Dawn, after a line from Metallica's Fade to Black ("Growing darkness 'taking dawn...")
- Tangerine Dream after a misheard lyric from the Beatles' "Lucy in the Sky with Diamonds" ("With tangerine trees and marmalade skies")
- Texas Is the Reason, after a line from the Misfits' "Bullet" (Texas is an outrage when your husband is dead/Texas is an outrage when they pick up his head/Texas is the reason that the president's dead/You gotta suck, suck, Jackie suck")
- Thee Michelle Gun Elephant, after a friend mispronounced the title of an early jam session recording featuring cover songs of Thee Headcoats and the Damned's album Machine Gun Etiquette.
- There She Was, after Scritti Politti's song "Boom There She Was".
- Temple of the Dog, from a line in "Man of Golden Words" by Mother Love Bone.
- These New Puritans, after the Fall's "New Puritan"
- Through the Eyes of the Dead, after Cannibal Corpse's "Staring Through the Eyes of the Dead"
- Johnny Thunders, after the Kinks' "Johnny Thunder"
- Toad the Wet Sprocket, after a fictional band in a comedy sketch by Monty Python (which originally appeared on Rutland Weekend Television.
- Toys Went Berserk, after a line from Siouxsie and the Banshees song "Spellbound" ("When you think/Your toys have gone berserk/It's an illusion")
- Walk the Moon, named after the Police song "Walking on the Moon"
- Wet Wet Wet, after a line from Scritti Politti's "Gettin' Havin' And Holdin'". ("It's tired of joking—wet, wet with tears")
- The Wiggles, from "Get Ready to Wiggle", by a predecessor band, the Cockroaches.
- Winds of Plague, after a line of the song "Endless" by Unearth; "Have brought you to the winds of plague?"

== Incorrect associations ==
- BarlowGirl is not named after Superchick's "Barlow Girls". Superchick recorded their song as a tribute to the band.
- Godsmack was not named after Alice in Chains' "God Smack" from the Dirt album. Rather, the band's name came from an incident where lead singer Sully Erna "was making fun of somebody who had a cold sore on his lip and the next day (he) had one (him)self and somebody said, 'It's a godsmack.'"
- I Set My Friends on Fire was not named after Aiden's "I Set My Friends on Fire". They stated on the Myspace blog that "(They) didn't even know that it was an Aiden song until it was too late."
- Machine Head. Many people thinks that name comes from Deep Purple's album, but Dave McClain confirmed that is not. He stated that Robb Flynn came up with this name because it "sounded cool".
- Walter TV is not named after Makeout Videotape's "Walter TV". Pierce McGarry stated in a 2014 interview with Noisy that Mac DeMarco named the song after McGarry's band to "get more hits on MySpace".

== See also ==
- List of band name etymologies
