= The Big Express =

Studio album by XTC
- Released: 15 October 1984
- Recorded: March–July 1984
- Studios: Crescent (Bath); Odyssey (London)
- Genre: Progressive pop
- Length: 44:01
- Label: Virgin
- Producers: David Lord; XTC

XTC chronology
Mummer (1983)	The Big Express (1984)	25 O'Clock (1985)

Singles from The Big Express
- 1. "All You Pretty Girls" Released: 3 September 1984; 2. "This World Over" Released: 29 October 1984; 3. "Wake Up" Released: 28 January 1985 (UK, EU, & AU)

The Big Express is the seventh studio album by the English rock band XTC, released on 15 October 1984 by Virgin Records. It is an autobiographical concept album inspired by the band's hometown of Swindon and its railway system, the Swindon Works. In comparison to its predecessor Mummer (1983), which had a modest, pastoral approach to production, the album features a bright, uptempo sound marked by studio experimentation and denser arrangements, setting a template that they further developed on subsequent albums.

XTC produced the album with Crescent Studios owner David Lord on a budget exceeding £75,000 (equivalent to £240,000 in 2025). Like Mummer, the Glitter Band's Pete Phipps was hired as a session drummer for the band. They continued extending their use of exotic colors, incorporating instruments such as LinnDrum, euphonium, and E-mu Emulator for the first time in their work. Much of the album showcased the band's psychedelic influences through its reliance on Mellotron, a tape-based sampling keyboard popular in the 1960s and 1970s, and effects such as reverse echo and phasing. The title refers to express trains and artistic expression.

Lead single "All You Pretty Girls" peaked at number 55 on the UK Singles Chart and its music video cost £33,000 to produce. The Big Express received little critical notice and sold fewer copies than Mummer. It reached number 38 on the UK Albums Chart and number 178 on the US Billboard 200. Some critics suggested that its music suffered from overproduction and a lack of dynamics. In later years, the record has been described as "hugely influential". Japanese rock band Seagull Screaming Kiss Her Kiss Her derived their name from the album track of similar title.

== Background ==
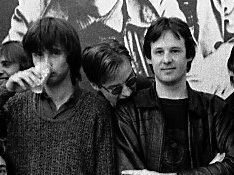
XTC in 1980. From left: Colin Moulding, Andy Partridge, and Dave Gregory.

XTC's previous album Mummer was their first work after resigning from live performances in 1982. It was released in August 1983 after several months of delays due to the band's creative difference with producer Steve Nye and Virgin Records and became the group's lowest-charting album to date. Virtually every contemporary review of the album accused the band of falling out of touch with the contemporary music climate. Bassist Colin Moulding thought that "when we came back from America after our aborted tour of 1982 ... people like Spandau Ballet had moved onto the scene; new groups were coming up and there was no place for us." Dissatisfied with the downturn in their career, drummer Terry Chambers quit the group early in the Mummer sessions to take care of his wife and newborn child in Australia.

In the meantime, guitarist and principal songwriter Andy Partridge produced Peter Blegvad's album The Naked Shakespeare (1983). Partridge said that his services were requested partly because Blegvad heard a rumour that he had died in 1982. He summarized his feelings at the time: "We're about to make another [album] that probably won't sell very well, and Virgin are getting fed up with us and starting to grumble about potentially not carrying on with us ... I was really confused about what I was supposed to be doing." Immediately after Mummer, he stated that he thought the next album would have a more contemporary R&B sound and that the band were "conscious of wanting to get away from the" style of their previous two studio albums, and said that "I don't think you'll hear any acoustic guitars this time, or any particularly multilayered things." Years later, he reflected that "Funk Pop a Roll" from Mummer could be considered "the first Big Express track".

In late 1983, XTC released the holiday single "Thanks for Christmas" under the pseudonym Three Wise Men. It was produced by David Lord, owner of Crescent Studios in Bath, who impressed the band with the story that he had turned down an offer to arrange the Beatles' "She's Leaving Home" (1967). He met Partridge while working as an engineer on The Naked Shakespeare. According to biographer Neville Farmer, Lord was "a world's away from XTC", having turned down the Beatles offer because he believed the Beatles were not serious musicians, and "made a deep impression on Andy. He hadn't had a musical guru before now. David Lord could hold his own in any musical conversation and piqued Andy's interests in unexplored musical areas." Moulding was not as effused and said he was unable to relate to Lord on a musical level. XTC subsequently negotiated a deal that allowed them to work as much as they want on their next album at his studio. In April 1984, about a month into the new album sessions, the group learned that ex-manager Ian Reid had incurred them an outstanding value-added tax bill of several hundred thousand pounds, and they immediately pursued litigation that would last for the next five years. David Lord adds: "This story about me turning down the Beatles as 'not serious musicians' is nonsense! I think it grew from something I told Andy once - as a music student in the days when 'Sgt. Pepper' was being recorded, a number of us were invited to be part of the cheering crowd at Abbey Road; sadly I was already committed elsewhere and couldn't make it! That's all!"

== Concept and production ==
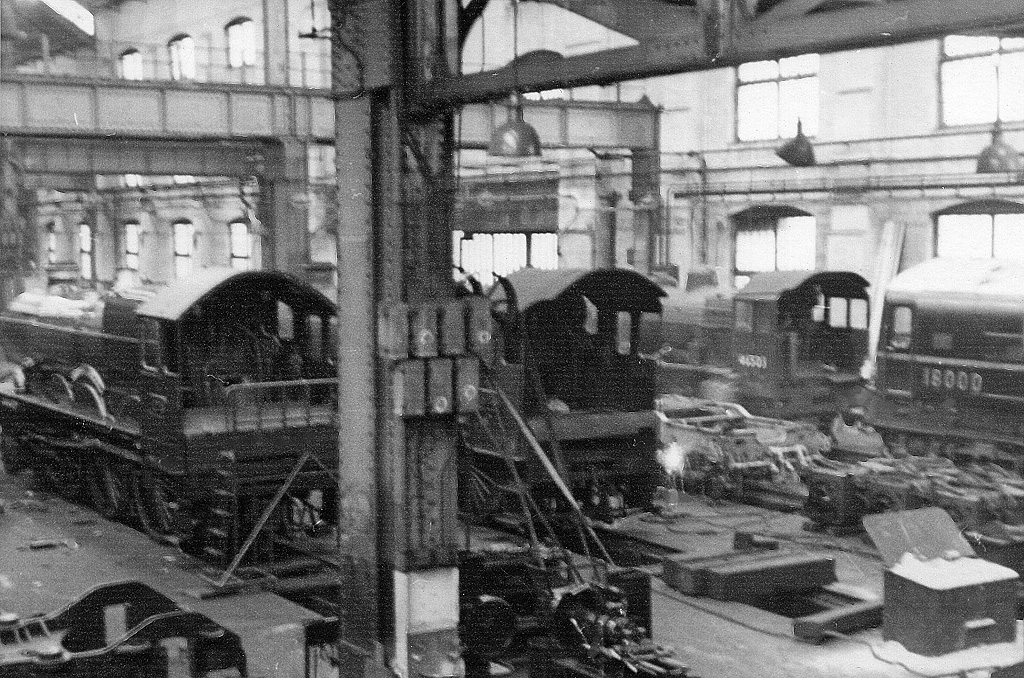
The impending closure of the Swindon Works formed a backdrop to the record.

The intention for The Big Express was to "let the music have a more boisterous feel" and for the lyrics to be more worldly. For the album title, Partridge wanting something that was reminiscent of his hometown Swindon, which was well known for its railway repair workshop, the Swindon Works. Working titles included Coalface, Head of Steam, Shaking Skin House, Bastard Son of Hard Blue Rayhead, The Known World, Bull with the Golden Guts, Mindless Sax and Violins, and Under the Rusting North Star. The Big Express was chosen for its double meaning, referring to express trains and artistic expression. Partridge envisioned the record as "industrial pop. We come from a railway town, and I was like, 'Well, let's wallow in that; in the imagery and the sounds. Let's make an album that's riveted together and a bit rusty around the edges and is sort of like broken Victorian massive machinery.'" He said that the record "might be a concept album by stealth" since most, if not all of the songs he and Moulding wrote were autobiographical to some extent. Two were of a political bent ("This World Over" and "Reign of Blows"). The majority of Partridge's songs were composed on an open E-tuned guitar with a broken E string.

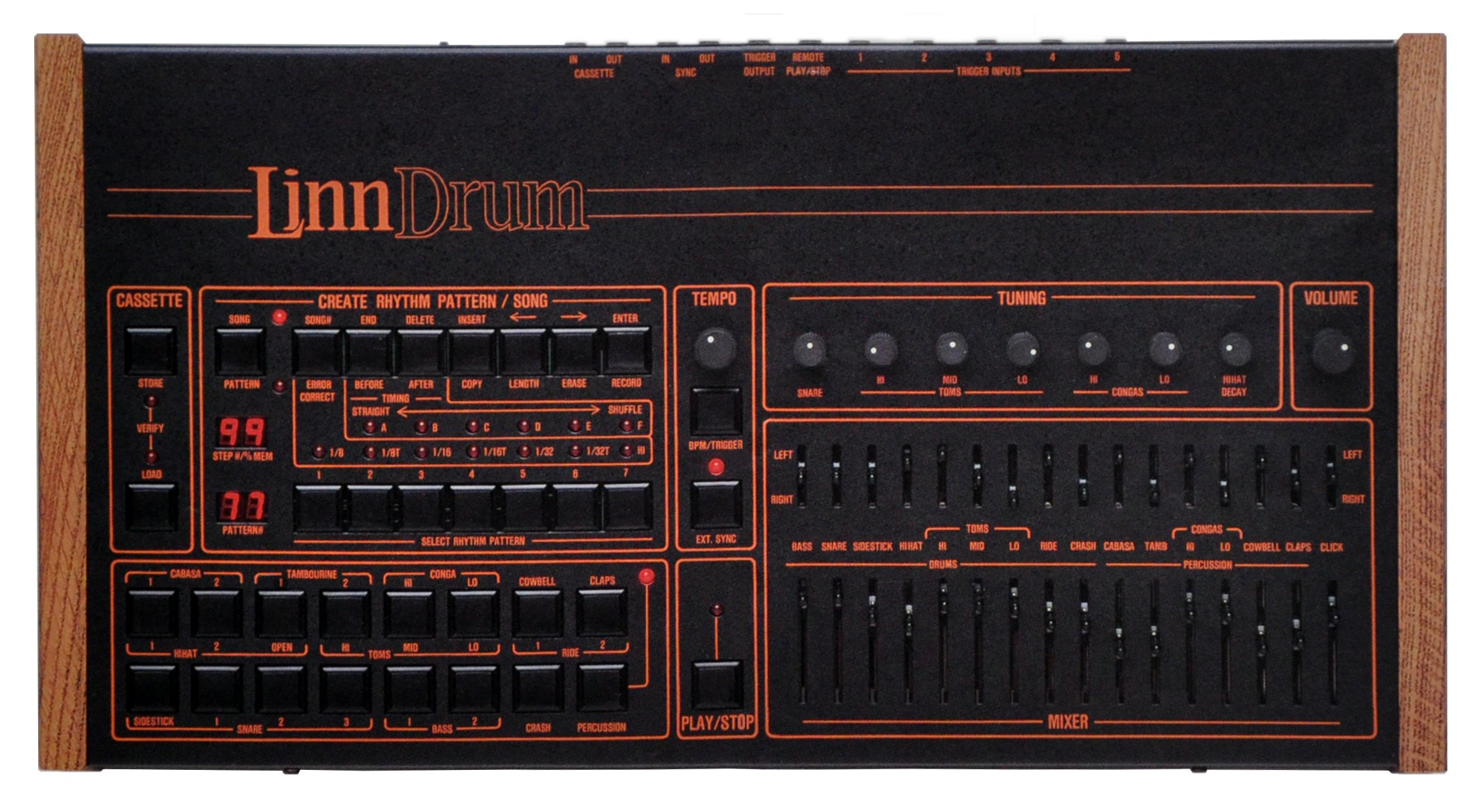
LinnDrum samples are a prominent feature of the album

The Big Express was recorded on a budget of £75,000 or £90,000 (equivalent to £240,000 or £293,000 in 2025) and on 24-track tape. Sessions began in March 1984. As was the case for Mummer, the Glitter Band's Pete Phipps was hired as a session drummer for the band, and the group continued making more use of exotic instrumentation, such as the Mellotron they had purchased for that album. Other keyboard instruments included a Prophet-5, a Yamaha CP-80, and a Roland JX-3P owned by guitarist Dave Gregory. Some of The Big Express was recorded using a Linn LM-1 Drum Computer and extensive time was spent on its programming. Moulding played a Wal bass that was one of the first guitars built with an active circuit, a component which boosts treble at the cost of bass, which was popular among 1980s musicians. He used the bass on about four tracks and said that it provided a "middley, borpy sound I was after." Tears for Fears, who were recording Songs from the Big Chair (1985) at a nearby studio in the area, loaned the group an E-mu Emulator. Session musician Stuart Gordon was brought in as violinist. Some overdubs were recorded at Odyssey Studios in London. Mixing was completed in early August by producer Phil Thornalley at RAK Studio Two; Lord left the project a month earlier to fulfill a contract with the Europeans, a British band.

The result returned the group to a brighter and uptempo sound with arrangements denser than on any previous XTC album. Gregory reflected: "we were thinking, 'What else can we put on this track' - even if it didn't need anything adding. David Lord was as bad as Andy for tarting things up when they didn't need tarting up." He remembered "a whole afternoon I spent trying to find the right hi-hat sound. It was stupid and the album lacks energy because of it!" Moulding felt the recording was not an enjoyable experience: "It was just too analytical. Andy tends to analyse down to the minutest detail. We'd be listening to bass drums all fuckin' day to see if they had any feel!" He described it as "the LinnDrum album" and added they had stopped "playing as a band" due to the reliance on overdubs. Partridge jokingly referred to some parts of the album as the only time the group were befallen with stereotypical 1980s-style production.

In Partridge's view, the group's psychedelic influences were "leaking out" through the use of Mellotron, phasing, and "backwards so-and-so". One of the songs he wrote around this time was "Your Gold Dress", something he felt could possibly be worked into a 1960s psychedelic style, an idea that XTC would soon explore with the Dukes of Stratosphear side project. Moulding offered the song "Shiny Cage", but it was rejected by the band, Partridge said, "because it was too stupidly Beatley - it was everything from Revolver all smashed into one song."

== Songs ==
=== Side one ===
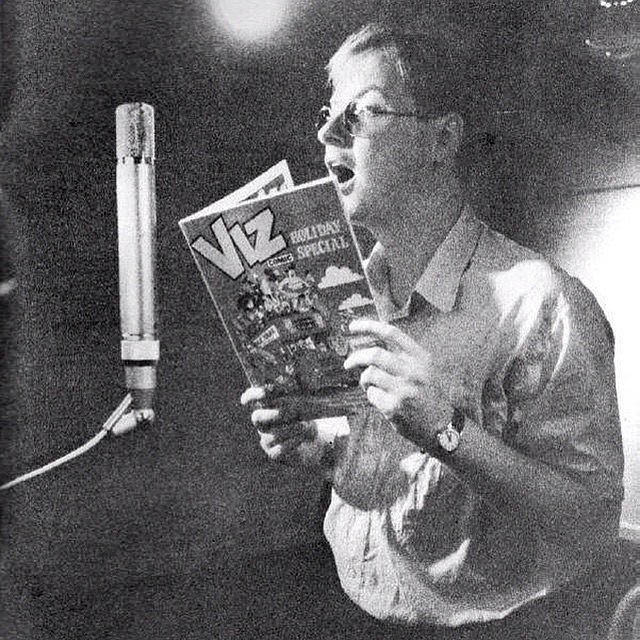
Andy Partridge (pictured circa mid 1980s) wrote and sang most of The Big Express

==== "Wake Up" ====
Partridge wrote all the songs on The Big Express, except for "Wake Up" and "I Remember the Sun", which were written by Moulding. "Wake Up" opens the album with guitars and piano followed by a chorus lyric that proclaims "who cares, you might be dead". Dave Gregory commented: "We love confusing intros: records that start with a naked riff with no drum beat. And then when the drums come in, or the band comes in, it throws you completely." To write the song, Moulding started with a three-note piano figure, which he then overdubbed with two guitar riffs: "The track didn't really happen until David Lord got hold of it. A local girl came in and sang the 'choir', tracked up a load of times."

==== "All You Pretty Girls" ====
"All You Pretty Girls" is a kind of sea shanty centred on females. According to Partridge, the song came about while he was "dicking around, playing some [Jimi] Hendrix. ... I was just playing this little two-note, quasi-Hendrix thing, and I liked the inherent melody in it. It felt like a really archaic old folk melody." With the exception of the opening, all the drum sounds in the recording were made with the LinnDrum, while the choir sounds were a Mellotron sample played out of a speaker inside a fire bucket. Of the song's lyrics, he said that although they were "not quite autobiographical, it's me fantasizing about being my father, about being in the Navy."

==== "Shake You Donkey Up" ====
"Shake You Donkey Up" is a hoedown whose narrator is portrayed as a jilted lover. Although the lyrics appear nonsensical, they are an autobiographical rumination on "unenlightened attitudes about women ... as mothers to be bullied or girlfriends who are going to get drunk and attack you." Partridge instructed Moulding to have the bass sound like the 1972 Jimmy Castor Bunch song "Troglodyte (Cave Man)", "a great crunching bass line. So it's a homage to Jimmy, a sort of memory lift." He also cited Captain Beefheart's "Sure 'Nuff 'n' Yes I Do" (1967) as an influence. Phipps played a drum kit consisting of buckets and trays.

==== "Seagulls Screaming Kiss Her Kiss Her" ====
"Seagulls Screaming Kiss Her Kiss Her" marked another seaside-themed song. It germinated from a piano riff found during the 1981 sessions for English Settlement and later composed on the band's Mellotron using only three fingers. Partridge commented on its unusual "dream"-like structure and recalled having the 1968 Joe Cocker song "Marjorine" in mind when he wrote it. He said that his lyrics to "Seagulls" were likely about Roy Lichtenstein's then-girlfriend Erica Wexler, who would later become Partridge's wife. Partridge met Wexler at the US premiere of the 1980 film Times Square and remembered: "I didn't want to think of it as love at first sight, because I'd only been married for something like six months, so it was a bit painful, you know? It was like, "'Shit! I'm married!" Steve Saunders, known for his work with Michael Nyman, played the song's euphonium solo.

==== "This World Over" ====
"This World Over" is a song protesting the use of nuclear weapons as a reaction to recent speeches by Ronald Reagan, which instigated Partridge's fears of another Cold War. Accordingly, "My first child was on the way and [I] just thought that, if I survived, how terrible it would be to have to tell her what life used to be like, that there was once a place called London and it was a fantastic place but it's not there anymore." One of the guitar parts is a slew of sustained feedback notes played through a Marshall amplifier. The "high stratospheric squeaking noises in the last verse", Partridge said, are viola harmonics played by session musician Stuart Gordon, who "saws the bow over at a harmonic point, very whistly, and that was put into a [Roland] Chorus Echo. Glorious, reminiscent of birds and ... grand things." All of the drums were samples. The guitar chords in this song are the same as those in "Complicated Game", from their earlier Drums and Wires record.

=== Side two ===
==== "The Everyday Story of Smalltown" ====
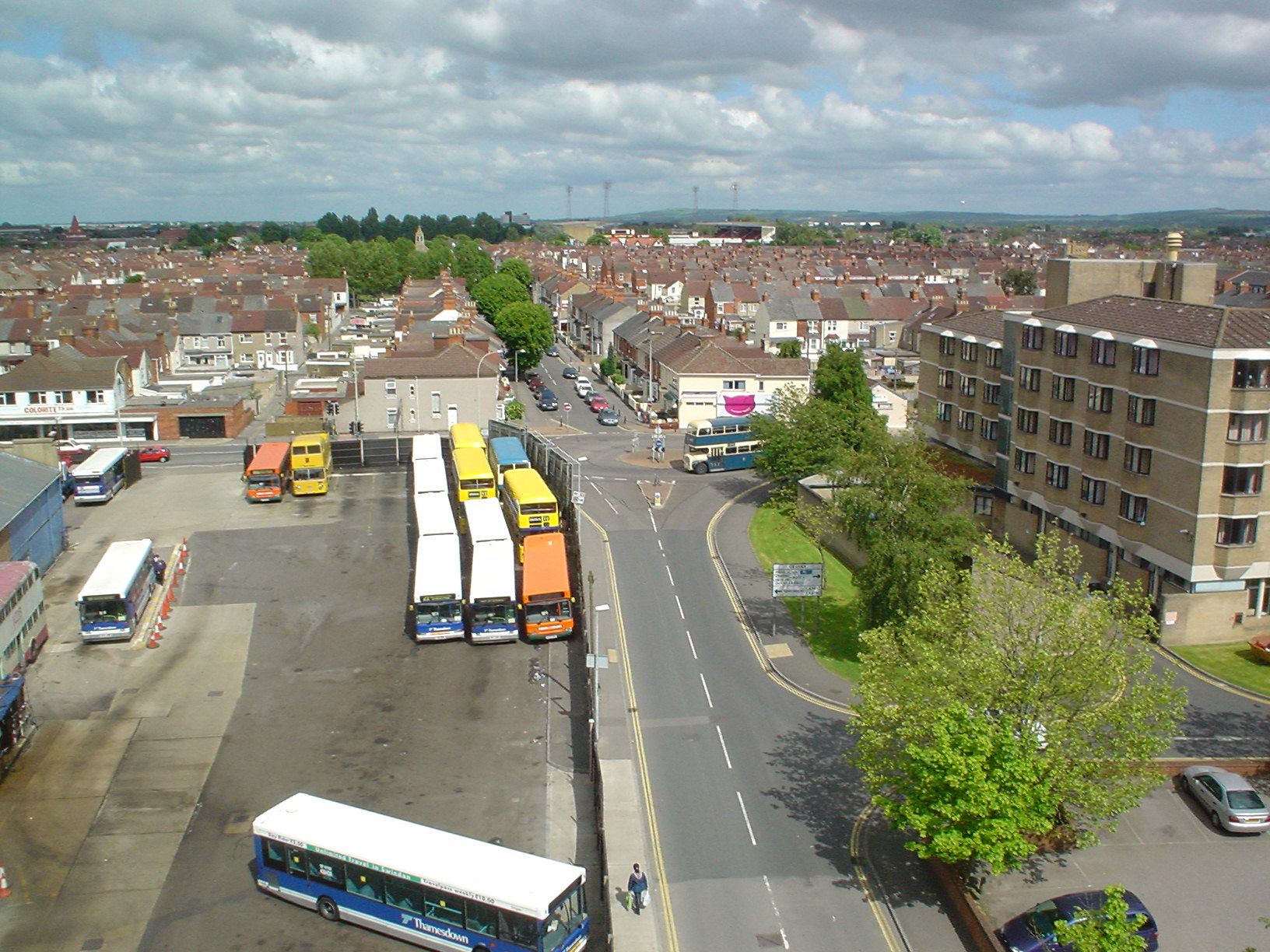
A view of Swindon in 2005

"The Everyday Story of Smalltown" introduces side two with the sounds of kazoo and drums. Partridge described the Swindon-inspired song as "all autobiographical", including the mention of a milkman who "lift[ed] his foot off [the] accelerator. It woke me up one morning and I thought, That's got to go into a bloody song." Its sampled brass band marked the band's first use of an E-mu Emulator. One of the guitar lines was taken from the Beatles' "Fixing a Hole" (1967). Gregory was enthused with the song and hoped it would have been released as a single, later opining that it was "twatted by a lousy mix". He said: "The big finale of the song features one of Andy's soon-to-be-favourite production techniques-- the over-layering of earlier vocal and instrumental themes as a counterpoint to the main chorus. It clatters off in jubilant canonic style, neatly cross-fading into the languid guitar introduction to 'I Bought Myself A Liarbird' -- a nice moment."

==== "I Bought Myself a Liarbird" ====
"I Bought Myself a Liarbird" is about Ian Reid, the band's former manager. The title is a pun on "lyrebird". In the 1998 XTC biography Song Stories, the song's entry simply states: "Due to a legal arrangement with their former management, XTC is unable to discuss the lyrical content of this song!"

==== "Reign of Blows" ====
"Reign of Blows", according to Partridge, "is about violent regimes," and so he decided to distort his vocals through an amplifier "to sound violent". The effect was disliked by Moulding and Gregory, and Virgin was against including the track on the album. Gregory surmised this was because the lyrics could be perceived as "anti-American". Instrumentation included distorted guitar and harmonica, an open-E tuned guitar played in the style of Keith Richards, and a number of violin overdubs.

==== "You're the Wish You Are I Had" ====
"You're the Wish You Are I Had" features lyrics that may be about a character "going off his head" over a woman, possibly as part of an affair. It was another song about Wexler, "and also probably some previous girlfriends as well," Partridge said. He likened the chorus to one of Paul McCartney's songs on Sgt. Pepper's Lonely Hearts Club Band (1967): "I was still struggling at the time with this Beatle influence, which was getting bigger and bigger in me, and I was refusing to acknowledge it." In a 1984 interview, he did acknowledge a fondness for "things with pounding piano, everything from Velvet Underground's 'I'm Waiting for My Man', to things that people like the Beatles or the Rolling Stones did at any time -- I just love banana-fingers piano." Gregory said that it was difficult to work out the keyboard part, which includes a "really weird" verse with a "C^{maj7} sort of chord to it". Farmer wrote: "The snare plays the hi-hat part, the bass plays a countermelody, the guitar solo twists and bends like Adrian Belew in a blender, and the piano chunkalunks like a pub pianola."

==== "I Remember the Sun" ====
"I Remember the Sun" is of a more relaxed mood when compared to the rest of the album. It was inspired by Moulding's memory of a bully from his youth, Chrissy Orral, who believed that Nazis were planning to invade Swindon. Partridge said it "was about the fields that [Colin] and I used to play over, next to the Penhill council estate." Moulding elaborated: "That piece of wasteland was immensely evocative in my imagination. My mum hated me getting wet, so I remember the sun because [I] was only allowed out when it was sunny. The sun was king." He originally conceived the song to be more rock-oriented, but because he was unsure of what direction the arrangement should go in, the final track came out "jazzy", which Partridge characterised as "the place you go when you're searching,"

==== "Train Running Low on Soul Coal" ====
"Train Running Low on Soul Coal" was the first song Partridge wrote for the album. He denied that he was inspired by the Kinks' "Last of the Steam-Powered Trains" (1968), explaining that the song was actually inspired by the Rolling Stones' "Can't You Hear Me Knocking" (1971), and that he did not listen to any Kinks albums until several years later. Partridge called "Train Running Low" "possibly one of the most autobiographical songs I've ever written. I'm the train and I'm worried about losing my inspiration, I'm worried about losing my steam for the whole thing -- the whole XTC creative process." The lyric states: "I'm a thirty year old puppy doing what I'm told and I'm told there's no more coal for the older engines". The line "couple of empty carriages" is a possible reference to Moulding and Gregory. Backwards echo and three 12-string guitars were used for the track. The album ends with sounds that resemble a train falling apart.

=== Leftover ===
Other songs were produced but left off the album. "Thanks for Christmas" was a novelty song recorded to test Lord's potential as a producer for the band a few weeks before sessions commenced. According to Partridge, "I like the idea of anonymous music, and I thought I'd put together a song and then find an act to do it." It is the only instance in the band's catalog where Partridge and Moulding share lead vocals. Originally, the group wanted to call themselves "the Virgin Marys", but the label objected. Another song, "Countdown to Christmas Party Time", was recorded to be its B-side. He described the song as "all-out stupid funky" and "ersatz Michael Jackson or something". Erica Wexler contributed backing vocals and David Lord is credited as "The Good Lord" on the record sleeve.

Three outtakes were relegated as B-sides to the album's singles. "Red Brick Dream" is an original poem about the Great Western Railway workshops. Partridge set it to music after he was commissioned to write a song for a documentary about Swindon. In the film, he is shown performing the song at Crescent. "Washaway" was another Moulding song about growing up at Pen Hill and the first he wrote on a keyboard. He said: "'This is looking at people going about their business but not being where [I] should be—not being in school." "Blue Overall" saw Partridge drawing on Led Zeppelin's reconfiguration of blues music as originally played by black musicians. The lyrics are a commentary on critics who criticize "white boys" for singing the blues "and the rip-off sharks who infest music's murky waters".

== Release ==
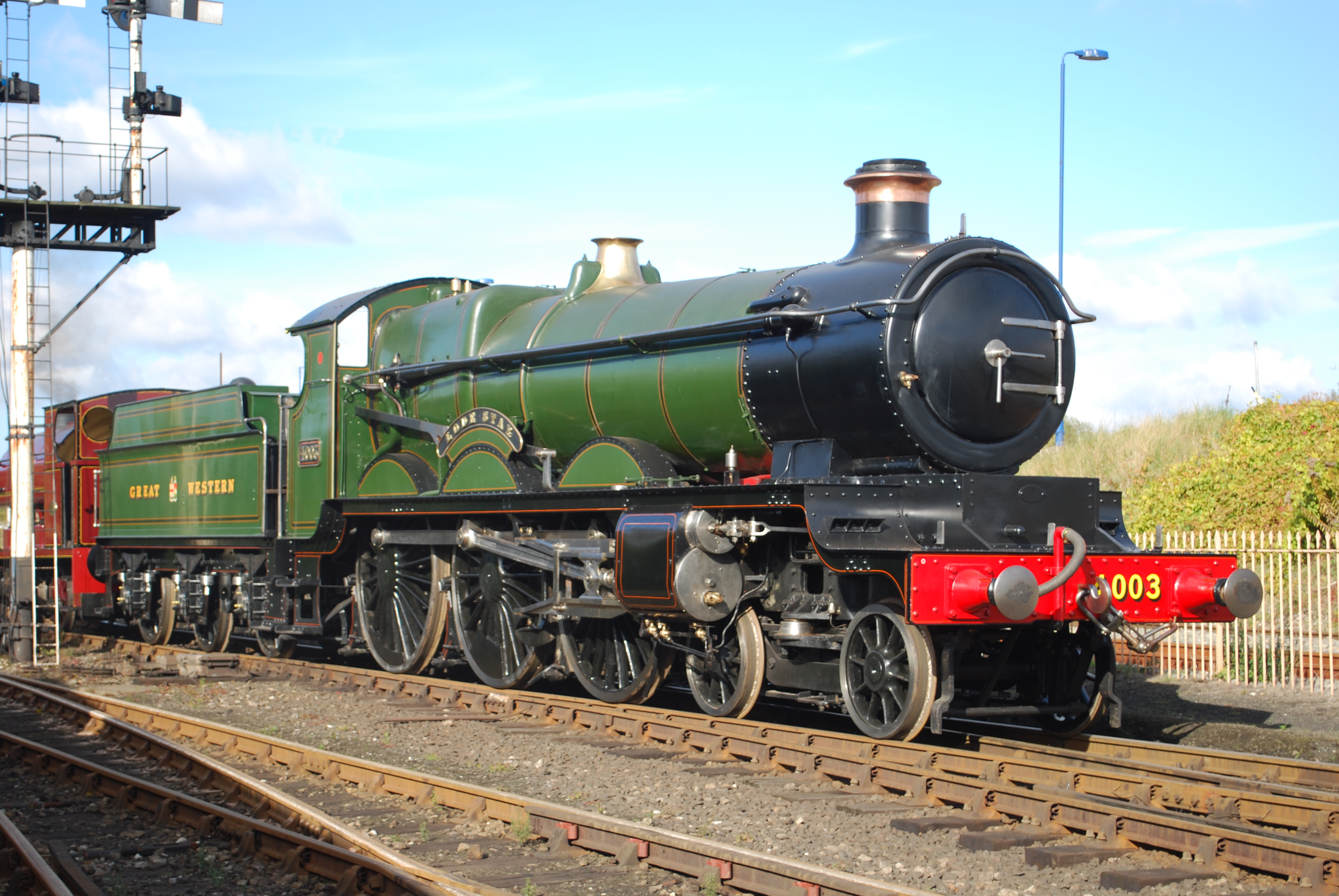
The Lode Star locomotive pictured on the inner sleeve

Virgin invested £33,000 into a music video for lead single "All You Pretty Girls", which peaked at number 55 on the UK Singles Chart. The Big Express was released on 15 October 1984. First pressings of the vinyl were contained in a circular record sleeve as an homage to the Small Faces' Ogdens' Nut Gone Flake (1968). For the inner sleeve, the members were photographed in GWR outfits on the footplate of the Lode Star locomotive at the Swindon Railway Museum. XTC appeared on Channel Four's Play at Home programme performing an acoustic version of "Train Running Low on Soul Coal".

Although the LP reached a higher chart position than Mummer, it sold a lesser number of copies. The album spent two weeks on the UK charts, reaching number 38. In the US, the album spent 7 weeks on the Billboard 200 album charts and reached its peak position of number 178 in December 1984.

Within weeks of the album's release, the band's finances were depleted and further payments of advancements and royalties were frozen on account of the Reid litigation, forcing the group to subsist on short-term loans from Virgin. Partridge then conceived of a cheaply budgeted project in which the group adopted pseudonyms and recorded several songs faithful to the style of 1960s psychedelia. The end product, 25 O'Clock (1985), was publicised as a collection of recordings by an older band called "the Dukes of Stratosphear". 25 O'Clock ultimately sold twice as many copies as The Big Express, even before the Dukes' identity was made public. The second and last Dukes album, Psonic Psunspot (1987), included "Shiny Cage", the Moulding song previously rejected for The Big Express.

== Critical reception ==
=== Contemporary ===
The Big Express was met with critical acclaim, especially in the US. A reviewer for CMJ New Music Report wrote that the album was "mostly brilliant" and expressed hope that the band would gain the success and recognition they "fully deserv[e]". Ken Richardson of Stereo Review described the album as a "neglected masterwork". Rick Miller of The Spectator raved in a full-page review that it was "the most exciting record I've heard in years." He went on to say that in the year 2084, XTC would be as widely acclaimed as the Beatles.

Writing for The Village Voice, Robert Christgau awarded the album a B score and recommended that the group write a musical, "Which would keep them working at the proper scale and be the best thing for steam-powered trains since Ray Davies." Bernward Meier of the German Musik Express awarded the album a perfect score and praised the music as a skillful balance between children's songs, "hard blues", syncopated melodies and psychedelia, highlighting "This World Over" as its "most beautiful" song. In the magazine Smash Hits, guest writer Morrissey penned a review of the follow-up single, "This World Over", that stated "XTC have stepped back from music industry machinations and are making better records."

Erica Wexler, then a reviewer for Musician magazine, suggested that "XTC is never short of ideas; their only real flaw is a propensity for crowding together too many. But in this day of pop cliché, I'd take XTC's senses-working-overtime anytime. I just hope they're still not too far ahead of their time." In 1987, musician and writer Dave Bidini dubbed it perhaps "XTC's most humorless album - a sort of no-fun answer to the half-serious question asked on English Settlement. ... Colin Moulding gets philosophy-weird and Andy Partridge sounds depressed; the direction of the band seems blurred."

=== Retrospective ===
Professional ratings
Review scores
Source	Rating
AllMusic	4/5 stars
Chicago Tribune	2.5/4 stars
Encyclopedia of Popular Music	3/5 stars
The Rolling Stone Album Guide	3.5/5 stars

In later years, Partridge said "I love that album and nobody ever mentions it. That and Mummer are the two ignored discs." Moulding viewed the album less favourably. According to a Mojo journalist, the tedium of programming the LinnDrum patterns "sapped Colin and Dave's enthusiasm and it was years before Dave could bear to listen to the elaborately noisy result." Gregory recalled that his immediate reaction to hearing "Smalltown" decades later was "Damn, this needs mixing!" He explained: "There is a lot of musical and verbal detail in the track, though much of it is buried and blurred, creating a flat, un-dynamic listening experience."

Reviewing The Big Express for AllMusic, Chris Woodstra said that XTC created "their most painstakingly detailed, multi-layered, sonically dynamic" work to that point, resulting in "a thoroughly consistent and enjoyable album beginning to end." He also lamented that the 1986 follow-up Skylarking "gets much more glory" whereas "this one was virtually ignored". Dave Jennings of Louder Than War dubbed it a "masterpiece ... in a string of classic, innovative and hugely influential albums," highlighting the track "Seagulls" as "reason enough to label this album as 'classic'." The song inspired the name of the Japanese noise rock band Seagull Screaming Kiss Her Kiss Her.

According to the Chicago Reader's J.R. Jones, the album's songs rank "with the band's best work, but as a recording it's weighed down by the leaden drums". Q's Andrew Harrison described the record as "overproduced" and "LinnDrum-plagued", while the Chicago Tribune's Greg Kot said it was "XTC at its most cynical and grating". In a 2016 interview, Skylarking producer Todd Rundgren said he also took issue with the lack of dynamics on Big Express, which he believed came from Partridge's tendency to fill arrangements with as many ideas as possible. Music journalist Alexis Petridis referred to aborted tracks from Blur's Modern Life Is Rubbish (1993) as a disappointment for anyone "excited to hear [their] abandoned sessions with XTC's Andy Partridge ... they sound exactly as you would expect ... like the XTC of An Everyday Story of Smalltown".

== Demos, BBC Radio tracks and expanded reissue ==
XTC compilations that feature previously unreleased tracks related to the album include Drums and Wireless (versions of "Seagulls" and "Wish" recorded in 1984 for BBC Radio) and Coat of Many Cupboards (home demos of "All You Pretty Girls" and "Wake Up"). Partridge's Fuzzy Warbles series included home demos of "Liarbird" (volume one), "Wish" (volume two), "Countdown to Christmas" (volume four), "Smalltown" (volume five), "Seagulls" (volume seven), "Shake You Donkey Up" and "Reign of Blows" (both Hinges).

Throughout the 2010s, much of the band's catalog was reissued, one album at a time, in the form of deluxe packages centred on new stereo and 5.1 surround sound mixes by Steven Wilson. In 2017, the multitrack tapes for The Big Express were reported as missing, making it impossible for the album to be remixed. Partridge stated that the tapes were "not looked for yet" and that "we have to pay for any searches to find them". In 2022, the multitrack tapes were located and the album was remixed by Wilson, including the first-ever Dolby Atmos mix of an XTC work. The remixed and expanded reissue was finally released in September 2023.

== Track listing ==
All tracks are written by Andy Partridge, except where noted.

Side one
No.	Title	Writer(s)	Length
1.	"Wake Up"	Colin Moulding	4:40
2.	"All You Pretty Girls"		3:40
3.	"Shake You Donkey Up"		4:19
4.	"Seagulls Screaming Kiss Her Kiss Her"		3:50
5.	"This World Over"		5:37

Side two
No.	Title	Writer(s)	Length
1.	"The Everyday Story of Smalltown"		3:53
2.	"I Bought Myself a Liarbird"		2:49
3.	"Reign of Blows"		3:27
4.	"You're the Wish You Are I Had"		3:17
5.	"I Remember the Sun"	Moulding	3:10
6.	"Train Running Low on Soul Coal"		5:19
Total length:			44:01

2001 CD bonus tracks
No.	Title	Writer(s)	Original release	Length
12.	"Red Brick Dream"		B-side of "All You Pretty Girls" 12-inch single	2:01
13.	"Washaway"	Moulding	B-side of "All You Pretty Girls" 7-inch single	3:01
14.	"Blue Overall"		B-side of "This World Over" single	4:26

Note

- CD issues prior to 2001 placed the bonus tracks between the original sides one and two of the album.
- Original release information for bonus tracks sourced from Chalkhills and Children (1992), by Chris Twomey.

== Personnel ==
Credits adapted from the album's liner notes and an interview with "One Two Testing".

XTC

- Andy Partridge – vocals, guitar, LinnDrum, harmonica, sleeve design
- Colin Moulding – vocals, bass guitar
- Dave Gregory – guitar, Yamaha CP-80 electric grand piano, Mellotron, Prophet-5 and Roland JX-3P synthesizers, E-mu Emulator

Additional personnel

- Peter Phipps – drums
- Stuart Gordon – violin, viola
- Annie Huchrak – female choir voice on "Wake Up"
- Steve Saunders – euphonium on "Seagulls Screaming Kiss Her, Kiss Her"

Technical

- David Lord – production (except "Red Brick Dream"), engineering, mixing, choir arrangement on "Wake Up"
- XTC – production, mixing
- Glenn Tommey – additional engineering
- Phil Thornalley – mixing
- Matt Barry – mixing assistant
- Gavin Cochrane – sleeve photography
- Ken Ansell – sleeve design
- The Design Clinic – sleeve assembly

== Charts ==
Chart (1984)	Peak position
Australia (Kent Music Report)	96
UK Official Charts	38
US Billboard 200	178
