= Wake Up (XTC song) =

Single by XTC

from the album The Big Express
- B-side: "Take This Town"; "Mantis on Parole – Homo Safari Series No. 4"
- Released: 28 January 1985
- Recorded: 1984
- Length: 4:40 (album version); 3:43 (single version); 4:12 (home demo)
- Label: Virgin
- Songwriter(s): Colin Moulding
- Producer(s): David Lord; XTC

XTC singles chronology
"This World Over" (1984)	"Wake Up" (1985)	"The Mole from the Ministry" (1985)

Official audio
- "Wake Up" on YouTube

"Wake Up" is a song written by Colin Moulding of the English rock band XTC, released as the opening track on their seventh studio album The Big Express (1984). It was the third and last single issued from the album, following "All You Pretty Girls" and "This World Over", and peaked at number 92 on the UK singles chart.

== Overview ==
"Wake Up" opens the album with guitars and piano followed by a chorus lyric that proclaims "who cares, you might be dead". Colin Moulding explained:

"You stayed in bed / you wrote the note" is about me writing notes to skive off work in the early days of my marriage. My missus wouldn't let me go to work for the first few years. We were always at it! "A morning face" is that face you see every morning, usually a girl on the bus. But the last verse is about this paranoia, this recurring dream I have about being the first on the scene of an accident. If it's the positive version of the dream I resuscitate the victim and save the day. If it's the negative one, I run away.

To write the song, Moulding started with a three-note piano figure, which he then overdubbed with two guitar riffs. He said: "The track didn't really happen until [producer] David Lord got hold of it. A local girl came in and sang the 'choir', tracked up a load of times." Guitarist Andy Partridge said of Lord's embellishments: "He blew it up like one of those hot air balloons in the shape of a palace." Guitarist Dave Gregory commented: "We love confusing intros: records that start with a naked riff with no drum beat. And then when the drums come in, or the band comes in, it throws you completely."

The song employs only a few different chords, a point that Gregory was dissatisfied with. He opined: "The coolest part of the song was the chopping guitars but Colin should have written a better song around that hook. It just went on forever doing nothing. It sounds a good way to start an album but it's not my idea of a musical experience."

== Personnel ==
XTC

- Dave Gregory
- Colin Moulding
- Andy Partridge

Chorus Annie Hutchrack

== Charts ==
Chart (1985)	Peak position
UK Singles (OCC)	94
