= Psurroundabout Ride =

Compilation album by the Dukes of Stratosphear
- Released: 17 October 2019
- Recorded: December 1984; June 1987
- Studio: Chapel Lane Studios, Hereford, England, United Kingdom; Sawmills Studios, Fowey, Cornwall, England, United Kingdom
- Genre: Psychedelic pop
- Length: 72:58 (Compact Disc)
- Language: English
- Label: Ape House
- Producer: John Leckie (originals); Steven Wilson (remixes)

The Dukes of Stratosphear chronology
Chips from the Chocolate Fireball (1987)	Psurroundabout Ride (2019)

Psurroundabout Ride is a 2019 compilation album collecting the recorded output of the Dukes of Stratosphear, along with several new mixes of the songs.

== Critical reception ==
The editorial staff of AllMusic Guide gave the release 4.5 out of five stars, with reviewer Stephen Thomas Erlewine remarking that the demos and instrumentals are a delight and "it's enough rare and good stuff to warrant a purchase from Dukes fanatics".

== Track listing ==
The Compact Disc has all 19 songs from the band's catalogue, with all but "Open a Can of Human Beans" remixed from the original master tapes by Steven Wilson (this track was upmixed from the original stereo master via Penteo). The Blu-Ray has the original and new mixes, a 5.1 surround sound mix, instrumentals, and demos.

All songs written by Andy Partridge, except where noted.

Disc one – Compact Disc

25 O'Clock

1. "25 O'Clock" – 5:03
2. "Bike Ride to the Moon" – 2:22
3. "My Love Explodes" – 3:48
4. "What in the World??" (Colin Moulding) – 5:00
5. "Your Gold Dress" – 4:41
6. "The Mole from the Ministry" – 5:50

Psonic Psunspot

7. "Vanishing Girl" (Moulding) – 3:00
8. "Have You Seen Jackie?" – 3:21
9. "Little Lighthouse" – 4:31
10. "You're a Good Man Albert Brown (Curse You Red Barrel)" – 3:38
11. "Collideascope" – 3:24
12. "You're My Drug" – 3:20
13. "Shiny Cage" (Moulding) – 3:17
14. "Brainiac's Daughter" – 3:57
15. "The Affiliated" (Moulding) – 2:31
16. "Pale and Precious" – 4:56

Additional tracks

17. "Open a Can of Human Beans" – 4:44
18. "Black Jewelled Serpent of Sound" (Radio Caroline Edit) – 2:18
19. "Tin Toy Clockwork Train" – 3:17

Disc two – Blu-Ray

25 O'Clock (5.1 surround sound)

1. "25 O'Clock" – 5:03
2. "Bike Ride to the Moon" – 2:22
3. "My Love Explodes" – 3:48
4. "What in the World??" (Moulding) – 5:00
5. "Your Gold Dress" – 4:41
6. "The Mole from the Ministry" – 5:50

Psonic Psunspot (5.1 surround sound)

7. "Vanishing Girl" (Moulding) – 3:00
8. "Have You Seen Jackie?" – 3:21
9. "Little Lighthouse" – 4:31
10. "You're a Good Man Albert Brown (Curse You Red Barrel)" – 3:38
11. "Collideascope" – 3:24
12. "You're My Drug" – 3:20
13. "Shiny Cage" (Moulding) – 3:17
14. "Brainiac's Daughter" – 3:57
15. "The Affiliated" (Moulding) – 2:31
16. "Pale and Precious" – 4:56

Additional tracks (5.1 surround sound)

17. "Open a Can of Human Beans" – 4:44
18. "Black Jewelled Serpent of Sound" (Radio Caroline Edit) – 2:18
19. "Tin Toy Clockwork Train" – 3:17

25 O'Clock (2019 stereo mix)

20. "25 O'Clock" – 5:03
21. "Bike Ride to the Moon" – 2:22
22. "My Love Explodes" – 3:48
23. "What in the World??" – 5:00
24. "Your Gold Dress" – 4:41
25. "The Mole from the Ministry" – 5:50

Psonic Psunspot (2019 stereo mix)

26. "Vanishing Girl" – 3:00
27. "Have You Seen Jackie?" – 3:21
28. "Little Lighthouse" – 4:31
29. "You're a Good Man Albert Brown (Curse You Red Barrel)" – 3:38
30. "Collideascope" – 3:24
31. "You're My Drug" – 3:20
32. "Shiny Cage" – 3:17
33. "Brainiac's Daughter" – 3:57
34. "The Affiliated" – 2:31
35. "Pale and Precious" – 4:56

Additional tracks (2019 stereo mix)

36. "Open a Can of Human Beans" – 4:44
37. "Black Jewelled Serpent of Sound" (Radio Caroline Edit) – 2:18
38. "Tin Toy Clockwork Train" – 3:17

25 O'Clock (instrumentals)

39. "25 O'Clock" – 5:03
40. "Bike Ride to the Moon" – 2:22
41. "My Love Explodes" – 3:48
42. "What in the World??" (Moulding) – 5:00
43. "Your Gold Dress" – 4:41
44. "The Mole from the Ministry" – 5:50

Psonic Psunspot (instrumentals)

45. "Vanishing Girl" (Moulding) – 3:00
46. "Have You Seen Jackie?" – 3:21
47. "Little Lighthouse" – 4:31
48. "You're a Good Man Albert Brown (Curse You Red Barrel)" – 3:38
49. "Collideascope" – 3:24
50. "You're My Drug" – 3:20
51. "Shiny Cage" (Moulding) – 3:17
52. "Brainiac's Daughter" – 3:57
53. "The Affiliated" (Moulding) – 2:31
54. "Pale and Precious" – 4:56

Additional tracks (instrumentals)

55. "Black Jewelled Serpent of Sound" (Radio Caroline Edit) – 2:18
56. "Tin Toy Clockwork Train" – 3:17

25 O'Clock (original stereo mix)

57. "25 O'Clock" – 5:03
58. "Bike Ride to the Moon" – 2:22
59. "My Love Explodes" – 3:48
60. "What in the World??" (Moulding) – 5:00
61. "Your Gold Dress" – 4:41
62. "The Mole from the Ministry" – 5:50

Psonic Psunspot (original stereo mix)

63. "Vanishing Girl" (Moulding) – 3:00
64. "Have You Seen Jackie?" – 3:21
65. "Little Lighthouse" – 4:31
66. "You're a Good Man Albert Brown (Curse You Red Barrel)" – 3:38
67. "Collideascope" – 3:24
68. "You're My Drug" – 3:20
69. "Shiny Cage" (Moulding) – 3:17
70. "Brainiac's Daughter" – 3:57
71. "The Affiliated" (Moulding) – 2:31
72. "Pale and Precious" – 4:56

Additional tracks (original stereo mix)

73. "Open a Can of Human Beans" – 4:44
74. "Black Jewelled Serpent of Sound" (Radio Caroline Edit) – 2:18
75. "Tin Toy Clockwork Train" – 3:17

25 O'Clock demos

76. "25 O'Clock" (Demo)
77. "Bike Ride to the Moon" (Demo)
78. "My Love Explodes" (Demo)
79. "What in the World??..." (Demo) (Moulding)
80. "Nicely Nicely Jane" (Demo)
81. "Susan Revolving" (Demo)

Psonic Psunspot demos

82. "No One at Home" ("Vanishing Girl" Demo) (Moulding)
83. "Little Lighthouse" (Demo)
84. "Collideascope" (Demo)
85. "Shiny Cage" (Demo) (Moulding)
86. "Brainiac's Daughter" (Demo)
87. "The Affiliated" (Demo) (Moulding)

== Personnel ==
The Dukes of Stratosphear

- Sir John Johns – vocals, guitar, bass
- E. I. E. I. Owen – drums
- Lord Cornelius Plum – mellotron, piano, organ, guitar
- The Red Curtain – bass guitar, vocals, guitar

Other personnel

- Ian Gregory – liner notes
- John Leckie – liner notes, production on original recordings
- Swami Anand Nagara – liner notes
- Ray Schulman – mastering
- The Porcupine Tree – mixing, production on new mixes
