= Fuzzy Warbles =

Compilation album by Andy Partridge

The Fuzzy Warbles series brings together demonstrations, rarities, and side projects from XTC founding member Andy Partridge. The eight Fuzzy Warbles volumes, issued between 2002 and 2006, feature designs inspired by postage stamps. In addition, the Collector's Album packaging makes a nod to the philatelic theme, which it affirms by featuring an exclusive ninth disc called Hinges. The large volume of material dates back to 1979. Tracks include mastered versions of long-circulated bootlegs.

== Volume 1 (2002) ==
Fuzzy Warbles Volume 1

Compilation album by Andy Partridge
- Released: December 2002
- Genre: Pop rock
- Length: 59:03
- Label: Ape House

Andy Partridge chronology
Fuzzy Warbles Volume 1 (2002)	Fuzzy Warbles Volume 2 (2002)

Professional ratings
Review scores
Source	Rating
Pitchfork Media	(7.4/10) link
PopMatters	link

Fuzzy Warbles Volume 1 was released in December 2002. All songs are written by Andy Partridge.

1. "Dame Fortune" – 2:40
2. "Born out of Your Mouth" – 2:48
3. "Howlin' Burston" – 0:36
4. "Don't Let Us Bug Ya" – 2:43
5. "That Wag" – 4:52
6. "That Wave" – 3:43
7. "Ocean's Daughter" – 1:13
8. "Everything" – 3:17
9. "MOGO" – 2:16
10. "Goosey Goosey" – 3:54
11. "Merely a Man" – 2:49
12. "EPNS" – 2:40
13. "Summer Hot As This" – 4:15
14. "Miniature Sun" – 4:22
15. "I Bought Myself a Liarbird" – 3:03
16. "Complicated Game" – 2:42
17. "Wonder Annual" – 4:03
18. "Space Wray" – 1:46
19. "Rocket" – 5:21

The personnel for this song were:

- Andy Partridge – instruments and vocals on all tracks
- Dave Gregory – guitar on 5, 13, bass on 13, recording engineer on 12, 13
- Colin Moulding – bass on 5
- Dave Mattacks – drums on 5
- Barry Hammond – recording engineer on 5
- David Lord and Glenn Tommey – recording engineers on 7

All songs were recorded at Andy's home except 5 at Chipping Norton Recording Studios, Oxfordshire, 7 at Crescent Studios, Bath and 12, 13 at Dave's home.

- Mastered by Ian Cooper at Metropolis Mastering, London
- Sleeve art by Andrew Swainson

Thank you thank you Steve Young for handling it all. Mark Thomas for the beautiful Ape logo and Erica for the biggest love.
Big thanks to Virgin Records for making this series possible and to Dave Gregory for cleaning and supplying master tapes for 5, 12 and 13.

== Volume 2 (2002) ==
Fuzzy Warbles Volume 2

Compilation album by Andy Partridge
- Released: December 2002
- Genre: Pop rock
- Length: 49:37
- Label: Ape House

Andy Partridge chronology
Fuzzy Warbles Volume 1 (2002)	Fuzzy Warbles Volume 2 (2002)	Fuzzy Warbles Volume 3 (2003)

Professional ratings
Review scores
Source	Rating
Pitchfork Media	(7.4/10) link
PopMatters	(not rated) link

Fuzzy Warbles Volume 2 was released in December 2002. All songs were written by Andy Partridge.

1. "Ridgeway Path" – 0:57
2. "I Don't Want to Be Here (AIDS Benefit Version)" – 4:02
3. "Young Marrieds" – 3:23
4. "No One Here Available" – 0:18
5. "Obscene Procession" – 4:13
6. "Miller Time" – 1:10
7. "You're the Wish You Are I Had" – 3:21
8. "Ra Ra Rehearsal" – 2:15
9. "Ra Ra For Red Rocking Horse" – 3:43
10. "Everything'll Be Alright" – 3:02
11. "25 O'Clock" – 2:22
12. "GOOM" – 1:59
13. "Chain of Command" – 2:41
14. "All of a Sudden (It's Too Late)" – 1:10
15. "Summer's Cauldron" – 5:33
16. "Then She Appeared" – 2:59
17. "It's Snowing Angels" – 3:18
18. "Ship Trapped in the Ice" – 3:11

The personnel for this song was:

- Andy Partridge – instruments and vocals on all tracks
- Colin Moulding – bass on 2, 13, 15 and vocal on 2
- Dave Gregory – piano on 8, guitar on 13 and 15, synth and drum programming on 15, recording engineer on 8, 15
- Terry Chambers – drums on 13
- Steve Warren and 'Bubble' – recording engineers on 13

All songs were recorded at Andy's home except 8, 15 at Dave's home and 13 at Redbrick Studio, Swindon Town Hall.

- Mastered by Ian Cooper at Metropolis Mastering, London
- Sleeve art by Andrew Swainson

Thank you thank you Steve Young for all the juggling. God and the Devil for refusing to exist, despite mankind's best efforts, and Erica for teaching me Fifi.
Big thanks to Virgin Records for making this series possible and to Dave Gregory for cleaning and supplying master tapes for 8 and 15.

== Volume 3 (2003) ==
Fuzzy Warbles Volume 3

Compilation album by Andy Partridge
- Released: February 2003
- Genre: Pop rock
- Length: 57:41
- Label: Ape House

Andy Partridge chronology
Fuzzy Warbles Volume 2 (2002)	Fuzzy Warbles Volume 3 (2003)	Fuzzy Warbles Volume 4 (2003)

Professional ratings
Review scores
Source	Rating
Pitchfork Media	(4.9/10) link

Fuzzy Warbles Volume 3 was released in February 2003. All songs written by Andy Partridge, except where noted.

1. "My Train Is Coming" – 2:43
2. "Lightheaded" – 3:29
3. "Goodbye Humanosaurus" – 3:11
4. "Humble Daisy" – 3:15
5. "You Like Me?" – 4:45
6. "Great Fire" – 3:38
7. "Work" – 3:03
8. "Mopti Fake 1" – 0:58
9. "Collideascope" – 3:00
10. "Mopti Fake 2" – 1:03
11. "When We Get to England" – 2:17
12. "Train Running Low on Soul Coal" – 4:18
13. "Holly Up on Poppy" – 3:02
14. "Strawberry Fields Forever" (Lennon/McCartney) – 4:01
15. "Autumn Comes Around" – 1:05
16. "Child's Crusade" – 2:38
17. "Little Lighthouse" – 5:15
18. "This Is the End" – 5:05
19. "Put It on Again" – 0:55

The personnel for this song was:

- Andy Partridge – instruments and vocals on all tracks
- Dave Gregory – All instrument and backing vocals on 14, recording engineer of 14
- Erica Wexler – Suzy Wong voice on 5

All songs were recorded at Andy's home except 14 at Dave's home.

- Mastered by Ian Cooper at Metropolis Mastering, London
- Sleeve art by Andrew Swainson

== Volume 4 (2003) ==
Fuzzy Warbles Volume 4

Compilation album by Andy Partridge
- Released: February 2003
- Genre: Pop rock
- Length: 56:03
- Label: Ape House

Andy Partridge chronology
Fuzzy Warbles Volume 3 (2003)	Fuzzy Warbles Volume 4 (2003)	Fuzzy Warbles Volume 5 (2004)

Professional ratings
Review scores
Source	Rating
Pitchfork Media	(4.9/10) link

Fuzzy Warbles Volume 4 was released in February 2003. All songs written by Andy Partridge.

1. "Tunes" – 0:24
2. "Bumpercars" – 3:59
3. "The Art Song (Something Good with Your Life)" – 2:51
4. "I'm Playing My Fano" – 1:11
5. "Zonked Right out on Life" – 5:17
6. "All I Dream of Is a Friend" – 3:43
7. "Peck the Ground Like a Chicken" – 1:26
8. "That's Really Super Supergirl" – 3:40
9. "Brainiac's Daughter" – 1:48
10. "Blue Beret" – 3:07
11. "Gangway, Electric Guitar Is Coming Through" – 1:50
12. "Mechanical Planet" – 3:54
13. "Helicopter" – 3:51
14. "The Ugly Underneath" – 3:13
15. "OMGO" – 2:03
16. "Where Is Your Heart?" – 2:57
17. "Hey, It's Alan Burston!" – 0:22
18. "Season Cycle" – 4:51
19. "Countdown to Christmas Partytime" – 5:36

The personnel for this song was:

- Andy Partridge – instruments and vocals on all tracks
- Dave Gregory – Synth guitar on 12, recording engineer on 12, guitar and backing vocal on 13
- Colin Moulding – bass and backing vocal on 13
- Terry Chambers – drums on 13
- Dave Morgan - psychedelic pensioner on 18
- Steve Warren and Bubble - Recording engineers on 13

All songs were recorded at Andy's home except 12 at Dave Gregory's home and 13 at Redbrick Studio, Swindon Town Hall.

- Mastered by Ian Cooper at Metropolis Mastering, London
- Sleeve art by Andrew Swainson

Thank you thank you Debbie Swainson for typing out all my gibber and for the translation on the cover of Warbles 3. Swindon for having something to kick against and Erica for being smart.
Big thanks to Virgin Records for making this series possible, and to Dave Gregory for the use of track 12.

== Volume 5 (2004) ==
Fuzzy Warbles Volume 5

Compilation album by Andy Partridge
- Released: September 2004
- Genre: Pop rock
- Length: 63:20
- Label: Ape House

Andy Partridge chronology
Fuzzy Warbles Volume 4 (2003)	Fuzzy Warbles Volume 5 (2004)	Fuzzy Warbles Volume 6 (2004)

Professional ratings
Review scores
Source	Rating
Pitchfork Media	(6.6/10) link

Fuzzy Warbles Volume 5 was released in September 2004. All songs written by Andy Partridge.

1. "Welcome to Volume 5" – 0:25
2. "Young Cleopatra" – 3:51
3. "I Defy You Gravity" – 4:18
4. "Ice Jet Kiss" – 0:36
5. "Broomstick Rhythm" – 3:37
6. "Earn Enough for Us" – 3:03
7. "Dear God (Skiffle Version)" – 1:00
8. "Crocodile" – 3:49
9. "Motorcycle Landscape" – 4:38
10. "Rook" – 3:44
11. "Don't You Ever Dare Call Me Chickenhead" – 2:12
12. "Mermaid Explanation" – 1:05
13. "Mermaid Smiled" – 2:26
14. "Aqua Deum" – 2:36
15. "Me and the Wind" – 4:19
16. "Smalltown" – 4:01
17. "Blue Overall" – 3:09
18. "Red Brick Dream" – 1:22
19. "Jacob's Ladder" – 6:14
20. "My Land Is Burning" – 6:55

The personnel for this song was:

- Andy Partridge – instruments and vocals on all tracks

All songs were recorded at Andy's home except 14 at Ollie Studios, London and 19 at Tudor Studios, Swindon.

- Mastered by Ian Cooper at Metropolis Mastering, London
- Sleeve art by Andrew Swainson

Thank you thank you Jiri Trnka, Jan Svankmajer, Karel Zamen, Gerry Anderson, George Pal, Roberta Leigh and all other puppet magic meisters.
Erica for naked yoga.
Big thanks to Virgin Records for making this series possible.

== Volume 6 (2004) ==
Fuzzy Warbles Volume 6

Compilation album by Andy Partridge
- Released: September 2004
- Genre: Pop rock
- Length: 62:04
- Label: Ape House

Andy Partridge chronology
Fuzzy Warbles Volume 5 (2004)	Fuzzy Warbles Volume 6 (2004)	Fuzzy Warbles Volume 7 (2006)

Professional ratings
Review scores
Source	Rating
Pitchfork Media	(6.4/10) link

Fuzzy Warbles Volume 6 was released in September 2004. All songs written by Andy Partridge, except where noted.

1. "The Laugh Track" – 2:46
2. "The Stinking Rich Song" – 2:53
3. "I Can't Tell What Truth Is Anymore" – 2:47
4. "Candle Dance" – 1:57
5. "The Tiny Circus of Life" – 3:10
6. "The Man Who Sailed Around His Soul" – 2:57
7. "In My Hand" – 2:49 (Mark Thomas, Martin "Woody" Wood)
8. "Difficult Age" – 3:43
9. "Pink Thing" – 3:17
10. "Shaking Skin House" – 4:24
11. "Bike Ride to the Moon" – 1:30
12. "My Love Explodes" – 1:55
13. "Omnibus" – 3:13
14. "Across the Antheap (Skylarking Demo)" – 2:49
15. "Across This Antheap (Oranges & Lemons Demo)" – 5:36
16. "Human Alchemy" – 5:58
17. "Moonlit Drive" – 3:12
18. "Prince of Orange" – 2:54
19. "End of the Pier" – 4:14

The personnel for this song was:

- Andy Partridge – instruments and vocals on all tracks

All songs were recorded at Andy's home except 1 at Chipping Norton Recording Studios where the 'secret' recording engineer was Barry Hammond.

- Mastered by Ian Cooper at Metropolis Mastering, London
- Sleeve art by Andrew Swainson

Thank you thank you Lone Star, Cherilea, Crescent, Britains, Beton, Airfix, Timpo, Marx and any other figure makers who made sure my childhood was well populated.
Erica for continual cheerleading.
Big thanks to Virgin Records for making this series possible.

== Volume 7 (2006) ==
Fuzzy Warbles Volume 7

Compilation album by Andy Partridge
- Released: September 2006
- Genre: Pop rock
- Length: 60:36
- Label: Ape House

Andy Partridge chronology
Fuzzy Warbles Volume 6 (2004)	Fuzzy Warbles Volume 7 (2006)	Fuzzy Warbles Volume 8 (2006)

Fuzzy Warbles Volume 7 was released in September 2006. All songs written by Andy Partridge.

1. "2 Rainbeau Melt" – 3:36
2. "Thrill Pill" – 0:46
3. "Sonic Boom" – 2:50
4. "I'm Unbecome" – 4:04
5. "Ballet for a Rainy Day" – 3:12
6. "1000 Umbrellas" – 1:39
7. "Ejac in a Box (MGOO)" – 3:08
8. "C Side" – 0:20
9. "Seagulls Screaming Kiss Her Kiss Her" – 3:38
10. "Ladybird" – 5:15
11. "Candymine" – 2:24
12. "Visit to the Doctor" – 3:29
13. "Cherry In Your Tree" – 2:53
14. "Desert Island" – 5:14
15. "Scarecrow People" – 4:17
16. "Hold Me My Daddy" – 4:13
17. "Books are Burning" – 4:23
18. "Bobba De Boop De Ba De Boobay" – 0:31
19. "Open a Can of Human Beans" – 4:44

The personnel for this song was:

- Andy Partridge – instruments and vocals on all tracks
- Dave Gregory – sitar guitar and Mellotron on 19
- Ian Gregory – drums on 19
- Colin Moulding – bass on 19

All songs were recorded at Andy's home except 19, partly recorded at Idea Studio, Wiltshire.

- Mastered by Ian Cooper at Metropolis Mastering, London
- Sleeve art by Andrew Swainson

Thank you, thank you, Pamela Green, June Palmer, Vicky Kennedy, Rita Landre, Maxine, Harrison Marks and especially Rosina Revelle, but Erica is better than all of them.
Big thanks to Virgin Records for making this series possible.

== Volume 8 (2006) ==
Fuzzy Warbles Volume 8

Compilation album by Andy Partridge
- Released: September 2006
- Genre: Pop rock
- Length: 56:57
- Label: Ape House

Andy Partridge chronology
Fuzzy Warbles Volume 7 (2006)	Fuzzy Warbles Volume 8 (2006)	Hinges (2006)

Fuzzy Warbles Volume 8 was released in September 2006. All songs written by Andy Partridge.

1. "Through Electric Gardens" – 4:59
2. "Skate Dreams Wet Car" – 2:04
3. "The Bland Leading The Bland" – 4:08
4. "Sliverstar" – 1:22
5. "I Gave My Suitcase Away" – 3:21
6. "Extrovert" – 3:38
7. "Another Satellite" – 5:12
8. "These Voices" – 1:02
9. "Song for Wes Long" – 0:56
10. "Happy Birthday Karen" – 1:04
11. "REM Producer Enquiry" – 2:36
12. "The Loving" – 4:18
13. "Shalloween" – 3:22
14. "Was a Yes" – 2:24
15. "Genie in a Bottle" – 1:37
16. "Disque Bleu" – 3:17
17. "Poor Skeleton Steps Out" – 2:21
18. "I Don't Want to Be Here" (original demo) – 4:16
19. "Chalkhills & Children" – 5:00

The personnel for this song was:

- Andy Partridge – instruments and vocals on all tracks

All songs were recorded at Andy's home.

- Mastered by Ian Cooper at Metropolis Mastering, London
- Sleeve art by Andrew Swainson

Thank you, thank you Steve Young and his team for continuous hard work, Andrew Swainson for the lovely artwork, Mark Thomas for the ever classy Ape logo, Per Aronsson for translating Swindon into Sweden and of course Erica for the best love that ever came my way.
Big thanks to Virgin Records for making this series possible.

== Hinges (2006) ==
Hinges

Compilation album by Andy Partridge
- Released: September 2006
- Genre: Pop rock
- Length: 33:00
- Label: Ape House

Andy Partridge chronology
Fuzzy Warbles Volume 8 (2006)	Hinges (2006)

Hinges is the ninth and final volume in the Fuzzy Warbles series, released in September 2006. The album is only available as a bonus CD in the 9-CD box set The Official Andy Partridge Fuzzy Warbles Collector's Album.

The title "Hinges" is a play on the stamp-collecting theme of the cover design of all 8 previous Fuzzy Warbles volumes, and the packaging of the box set resembles a stamp collector's album. Normally, stamp collectors attach their stamps to the pages of an album with special sticky fasteners called "hinges".

Hinges was released in September 2006. All songs written by Andy Partridge.

1. "Gold" – 3:31
2. "Now We Are All Dead (It Doesn't Matter)" – 3:16
3. "Rain of Blows" (early version) – 1:44
4. "Reign of Blows" – 5:06
5. "Jump" – 5:35
6. "Shake You Donkey Up" – 3:27
7. "Happy Families" – 2:30
8. "Here Comes President Kill Again" – 3:31
9. "Beating of Hearts" – 4:16

Andy Partridge – instruments and vocals on all tracks

All songs were recorded at Andy's home.

Mastered by Ian Cooper at Metropolis Mastering, London Sleeve art by Andrew Swainson

== The Official Fuzzy Warbles Collector's Album ==
The Official Fuzzy Warbles Collector's Album

Box set by Andy Partridge
- Released: September 2006
- Recorded: 1979–1999
- Genre: Pop rock
- Length: 498:17
- Label: Ape House

Professional ratings
Review scores
Source	Rating
Pitchfork Media	(6.1)

The Official Fuzzy Warbles Collector's Album is a CD box set of rarities from XTC guitarist and frontman Andy Partridge. The box set brings together the eight previously released Fuzzy Warbles volumes, originally issued between 2002 and 2006 and featuring designs inspired by postage stamps. The Collector's Album packaging makes a nod to the philatelic theme which it affirms by featuring an exclusive ninth disc called Hinges. The large volume of material dates back to 1979.

Tracks include mastered versions of long-circulated bootlegs and many demos of previously unreleased songs. Many of the demos are from the 1980s as well as the period in the 1990s when XTC was under obligation to Virgin Records, but not releasing albums. One highlight is a series of songs penned for Disney's James and the Giant Peach though not used for the film.
