= The Dukes of Stratosphear =

English psychedelic band

- The Dukes in 1987. Clockwise from top: E.I.E.I Owen (Ian Gregory), Sir John Johns (Andy Partridge), The Red Curtain (Colin Moulding), and Lord Cornelius Plum (Dave Gregory).

Background information
- Also known as: The Dukes
- Origin: Swindon, Wiltshire, England
- Genres: Psychedelic pop; psychedelic rock
- Years active: 1984–1985; 1987; 2003; 2008
- Label: Virgin
- Spinoff of: XTC
- Past members: Andy Partridge (Sir John Johns); Colin Moulding (The Red Curtain); Dave Gregory (Lord Cornelius Plum); Ian Gregory (E.I.E.I. Owen)

The Dukes of Stratosphear were an English rock band formed in 1984 by Andy Partridge, Colin Moulding, Dave Gregory, and Ian Gregory. Modelled after psychedelic pop groups from the 1960s, the Dukes were initially publicised by Virgin Records as a mysterious new act, but were actually an XTC spin-off band. They recorded only two albums: 25 O'Clock (1985) and Psonic Psunspot (1987). In the UK, the records outsold XTC's then-current albums The Big Express (1984) and Skylarking (1986).

Partridge envisioned the Dukes as an amalgamation of "your favourite bands from 1967." He and Dave Gregory conceived the project in 1979, and in December 1984 the band found the opportunity to spend a few days recording what would become 25 O'Clock. Three rules were set for its production: songs must follow the conventions of 1967 and 1968 psychedelia, no more than two takes allowed, and use vintage equipment wherever possible. After reuniting for the LP Psonic Psunspot, XTC told interviewers that the group were killed in a "horrible sherbet accident".

Several sequels were proposed but ultimately abandoned, including the mock rock opera The Great Royal Jelly Scandal, a prequel album featuring the Dukes in their early Merseybeat phase, and a glitter rock parody as "The Stratosphear Gang". In 1993, Partridge conceived a spiritual successor to the Dukes in the form of a "heavily sexual" bubblegum LP. Virgin rejected the album, leading XTC to go on strike against the label for several years. Some of its songs were later reworked and released on XTC albums and compilations.

The Dukes of Stratosphear anticipated and were celebrated by retro-minded movements such as the Paisley Underground. In 2003, they reunited to record one song commissioned by the MS Society, and in 2008, Partridge recorded two tracks credited to "the Dukes" as part of a commission for Eurostar. These songs were included as bonuses on reissues of the Dukes albums.

== Origins and early influences ==
As a teenager listening to psychedelic records, XTC leader Andy Partridge was particularly fond of Pink Floyd's "See Emily Play" (1967), Tomorrow's "My White Bicycle" (1967), and the Moles' "We Are the Moles" (1968). Partridge viewed psychedelic music as a "grown-up" version of children's novelty records, believing that many acts were trying to emulate records that they grew up with: "They use exactly the same techniques—sped-up bits, slowed-down bits, too much echo, too much reverb, that bit goes backwards... There was no transition to be made. You go from things like 'Flying Purple People Eater' to 'I Am the Walrus'. They go hand-in-hand." He also held a preference for British over American psychedelia: "In the States, it was all about reaction to the Vietnam War. The music was dark and brooding, filled with angry distortion." In 1975, he considered renaming his fledgling band the Helium Kidz to "the Dukes of Stratosphear", but he thought "it was too flowery and people would think we were a psychedelic group. ... We needed a fast inventive name." The band instead became XTC.

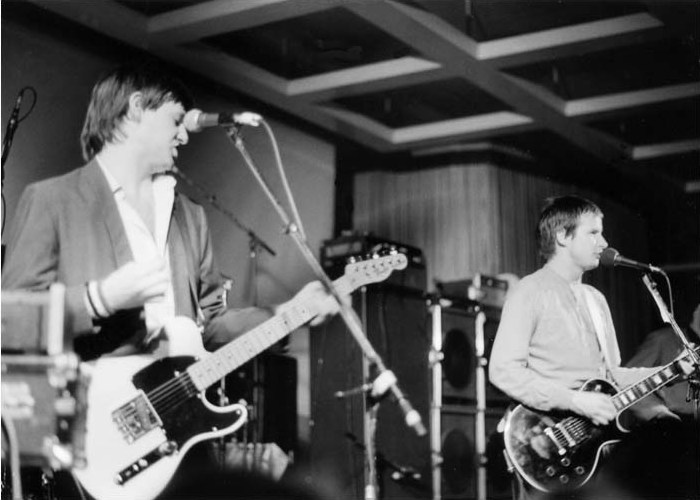
XTC performing live (pictured from left: Gregory and Partridge)

When guitarist and keyboardist Dave Gregory was invited to join XTC in 1979, Partridge learned that they both shared a passion for 1960s psychedelic music. An album of songs in that style was immediately put to consideration, but the group could not go through with it due to their commercial obligations to Virgin Records. "We talked about it a lot, but he wasn't even in the band at the time, and really, to be honest, I didn't have any spare time at all. I was constantly touring." Another consideration Partridge had was the punk rock movement's antipathy toward pop music of the past, which he considered "A real Pol Pot kind of thing, which is ludicrous, and rather nasty." At a Mummer session in 1982, he remembered saying to producer Steve Nye:

"Ooh, I’m a bit funny about how this came out, Steve, because it sounds a bit Beatles-esque to me, and I don’t want people to think I’m copying the Beatles." He said, "Who gives a fuck? That’s how you’ve written it—just do it!' ... I realised that I should not be ashamed about digging them up, and getting them wrong, and using them as my template. ... from that moment onward, I started to recognise that those songwriters—the Ray Davieses, the Lennons and McCartneys, the Brian Wilsons—had gone into my head really deeply.

During the making of XTC's 1984 album The Big Express, Partridge began writing material he thought could be performed in a psychedelic style, the first being "Your Gold Dress". He recalled "sneak[ing] off upstairs in Crescent Studios, in Bath, with my cassette machine and whisper[ing] these ideas for psychedelic songs into it. I was beginning not be able to contain the desire to do this. You can see it leaking out earlier ... 'Let's get a Mellotron! Let's put some backwards so-and-so on here.'"

== 1984–1987 ==
=== 25 O'Clock ===
In November 1984, one month after the release of The Big Express, Partridge travelled to Monmouth, Wales, with engineer John Leckie to produce the album Miss America by singer-songwriter Mary Margaret O'Hara, who had recently signed with Virgin. Partridge and Leckie were dismissed due to conflicts related to their religious affiliations or lack thereof, as O'Hara was a devout Catholic. Partridge was inspired by Nick Nicely's 1982 neo-psychedelic single "Hilly Fields (1892)", and devised a recording project to fill the newfound gap in his schedule. The rules were as follows: songs must follow the conventions of 1967 and 1968 psychedelia; no more than two takes allowed; use vintage equipment wherever possible. Partridge said: "I didn't really have songs ready, just ideas. I knew I wanted to do something like Syd Barrett. Perhaps a Beatles-esque track. ... I rung up the other guys and said 'Hey, let's put on a show!'; you know, that kind of thing." Leckie agreed to take on production and searched for a cheap studio for the band. Partridge invited his XTC bandmates to participate; they were augmented on drums by Dave's brother Ian, since the group did not have a drummer at the time.

"The Mole from the Ministry" (1985)
The album's only single, "The Mole from the Ministry", was an improvised-in-the-studio Beatles pastiche.

The label, although sceptical, lent the group £5,000, and they spent two weeks on the album's recording and mixing at Chapel Lane Studios in Hereford, England. The project was planned as a full-length LP, but only six songs could be recorded due to time constraints. The album was produced so cheaply that the band refunded £1,000 back to the label afterwards. Partridge looked back on these sessions as the "most fun we ever had in the studio." Each musician adopted a pseudonym: "Sir John Johns" (Partridge), "Lord Cornelius Plum" (Dave Gregory), "The Red Curtain" (bassist Colin Moulding), and "E.I.E.I. Owen" (drummer Ian Gregory, Dave Gregory's brother). Partridge's moniker was inspired by the DC Comics character the Martian Manhunter's name (J'onn J'onzz), while Moulding's was derived from an old nickname referring to the length of his hair. The band dressed themselves in Paisley outfits for the sessions and lit scented candles."

Released exclusively in Britain on April Fool's Day 1985, the mini-album 25 O'Clock was presented as a long-lost collection of recordings by a late 1960s group. Virgin Records publicised the Dukes as a mysterious new act, and XTC initially denied having any involvement with the record. A music video for "The Mole from the Ministry"—the first in which they were allowed total creative input—was produced for BBC West's RPM music programme. Partridge stated that "That's the only one of our videos that I've liked, the only one I can watch ... every little [promo] film [from 1967] we could find, we put ideas from them in there." In England, 25 O'Clock sold twice as many copies as The Big Express, even before the Dukes' identity was made public. The album also achieved considerable sales in the US, where XTC had not broken through. On XTC's next album, Skylarking (1986), the Dukes were thanked in the liner notes for the loan of their guitars.

=== Psonic Psunspot ===
Partridge was reluctant to make another Dukes album, but to appease requests from his bandmates and Virgin Records, Psonic Psunspot was recorded in June 1987 and released that August. He later said that "secretly I was thinking, 'Oh god, I wish they ask for a second one, because I'd love to do another one!'" This time, a £10,000 budget was supplied; Leckie returned as producer. Recorded in a different studio with more modern equipment, Partridge reflected that "I think we strayed a little from the truism of old gear and old stuff. It still sounds reasonably in the ballpark." Originally, the running order was supposed to begin with "You're My Drug" and end with "Collideascope", but Virgin suggested flipping the sides so that "Vanishing Girl" would be the opening track. Reportedly, Brian Wilson was played its Beach Boys pastiche "Pale and Precious" and thought it was styled after Paul McCartney rather than himself.

Once again, the Dukes' record outsold XTC's previous album in the UK (Skylarking). Partridge considered it "a bit upsetting to think that people preferred these pretend personalities to our own personalities… they’re trying to tell us something. But I don’t mind because we have turned into the Dukes slowly over the years." Moulding likewise felt that the "psychedelic element was being more ingratiated into the pie" since 25 O'Clock. Both Dukes releases were combined on CD as Chips from the Chocolate Fireball (1987). Later neo-psychedelic acts such as Kula Shaker, the Shamen and the Stone Roses would recruit Leckie based on his work with the Dukes.

== Later years and related projects ==
[P]eople think I'm besotted with the '60s, which I'm not. It's just that when we did the Dukes of Stratosphear I thought it would be a piece of fun to kind of be in the band that you always wanted to be in when you were a schoolkid.

— Andy Partridge

After Psonic Psunspot, XTC told interviewers that the Dukes had perished in a "horrible sherbet accident". Gregory felt that "I could carry on making Dukes albums for the rest of my career, but there's only so many laughs you can get out of one joke!" Partridge also did not feel that the Dukes could be taken any further: "We [only] did the [Dukes] as a joke and as a thank you to all of the bands that made our school days colorful." In 1991, he produced two more Dukes tracks, "It's Snowing Angels" and "Then She Appeared"; these were intended to be released as a hoax flexidisc attached to the cover of Strange Things Are Happening magazine, but the magazine folded before the single could be pressed. "Then She Appeared" would be reworked for XTC's 1992 album Nonsuch, while "It's Snowing Angels" was released in 1994 via Hello Recording Club, a record club label run by John Flansburgh of They Might Be Giants. Both tracks were included on Partridge's 2002 solo compilation Fuzzy Warbles Volume 2.

Several future Dukes releases were proposed but ultimately abandoned, including the mock-rock opera The Great Royal Jelly Scandal, an animated feature film of 25 O'Clock, a prequel album featuring the Dukes in their early Merseybeat phase, and a glam rock parody as "The Stratosphear Gang" (the last of which Partridge suggested might have comprised songs originally written for the Helium Kidz). In 1993, Partridge conceived a spiritual successor to the Dukes in the form of a "bubblegum" album which would have disguised itself as a retrospective compilation featuring 12 different groups from the early 1970s: "And all of the lyrics were heavily sexual. There was a song called 'Lolly (Suck It and See),' and there was another one called 'Visit to the Doctor,' which was vaguely molesting." He recalled playing some demos for Virgin staff, whose "jaws just hung open like that scene in The Producers when people see Springtime for Hitler the first time. There was a horrible silence for what seemed like an hour. And the project didn't get done". Several of its tracks were reworked and released by XTC; "Standing in for Joe" from the band's final album Wasp Star (Apple Venus Volume 2) was one such instance.

The four Dukes reformed in 2003 (by which time Dave Gregory had left XTC) to record the track "Open a Can (Of Human Beans)" for the Multiple Sclerosis Society of Great Britain charity compilation album The Wish List. In 2008, Partridge recorded "Tin Toy Clockwork Train", a solo promotional single for Eurostar credited to the Dukes, which was given away for free at railway stations. In April 2009, both Dukes records were released on CD for the first time in their own right, along with demo recordings, bonus tracks and new sleeve notes from the band. These editions are credited to "XTC as The Dukes of Stratosphear" and were released on Partridge's Ape House record label (they are also the first XTC recordings to which Virgin Records have relinquished the rights). "Human Beans" and another song that had been rejected by Eurostar ("Black Jewelled Serpent of Sound") were included as bonus tracks.

In 2019 all of the Dukes material was reissued on the CD/Blu-Ray compilation set Psurroundabout Ride, the title referring to the fact that all of the tracks (except "Open a Can (Of Human Beans)", for which the multitrack masters were presumably unavailable) were remixed for Blu-ray in 5.1 surround sound by Steven Wilson. The set also includes original and remixed stereo versions, as well as instrumental mixes and demos. Additionally, on October 9 2026, a new Blu-ray release included a brand new 2026 Dolby Atmos mix of the 2019 compilation by Wilson.

Ian Gregory died from cancer on 26 October 2026, aged 72. His death was announced by his brother.

== Members ==
The pseudonymous personnel included:

- Sir John Johns (Andy Partridge) – vocals, guitar, bass guitar
- The Red Curtain (Colin Moulding) – bass guitar, vocals, guitar
- Lord Cornelius Plum (Dave Gregory) – Mellotron, piano, organ, guitar
- E.I.E.I. Owen (Ian "Eewee" Gregory) – drums

Both 25 O'Clock and Psonic Psunspot were produced by John Leckie and the Dukes. On 25 O'Clock, the producers are credited as "John Leckie, Swami Anand Nagara and the Dukes"; Anand Nagara was Leckie's name when he was a follower of the Rajneesh movement.

== Discography ==
Studio albums

- 25 O'Clock (1985)
- Psonic Psunspot (1987)

Compilations

- Chips from the Chocolate Fireball (1987, CD issue of 25 O'Clock and Psonic Psunspot)
- Psurroundabout Ride (2019, 25 O'Clock and Psonic Psunspot plus bonus tracks in 5.1 surround sound)

== See also ==
- Neo-psychedelia
