= Chips from the Chocolate Fireball =

Compilation album by the Dukes of Stratosphear
- Released: August 1987
- Genre: Neo-psychedelia
- Length: 62:59
- Label: Virgin
- Producers: John Leckie and ‘The Dukes’

XTC other chronology
The Compact XTC (1987)	Chips from the Chocolate Fireball (1987)	Explode Together: The Dub Experiments 78-80 (1990)

Professional ratings
Review scores
Source	Rating
Allmusic	4.5/5 stars
Encyclopedia of Popular Music	5/5 stars

Chips from the Chocolate Fireball: An Anthology is a 1987 compilation album from XTC which was released under the pseudonym the Dukes of Stratosphear. It includes both the 1985 mini-album 25 O'Clock (as tracks 1–6) and the 1987 album Psonic Psunspot (as tracks 7–16), both of which were released on vinyl only.

== Track listing ==
All songs written by Sir John Johns (Andy Partridge), except where noted.

1. "25 O'Clock" – 5:03
2. "Bike Ride to the Moon" – 2:23
3. "My Love Explodes" – 3:49
4. "What in the World??..." – 5:01 (Colin Moulding as "The Red Curtain")
5. "Your Gold Dress" – 4:42
6. "The Mole from the Ministry" – 5:58
7. "Vanishing Girl" – 2:59 (Moulding)
8. "Have You Seen Jackie?" – 3:21
9. "Little Lighthouse" – 4:31
10. "You're a Good Man Albert Brown (Curse You Red Barrel)" – 3:38
11. "Collideascope" – 3:22
12. "You're My Drug" – 3:19
13. "Shiny Cage" – 3:17 (Moulding)
14. "Brainiac's Daughter" – 3:59
15. "The Affiliated" – 2:31 (Moulding)
16. "Pale and Precious" – 4:58

== Personnel ==
The Dukes of Stratosphear

- Sir John Johns (Andy Partridge) – vocals, guitar, bass guitar on "What in the World??..." and "Vanishing Girl", drums on "Pale and Precious"
- The Red Curtain (Colin Moulding) – vocals, bass guitar, guitar on "What in the World??..." and "Vanishing Girl"
- Lord Cornelius Plum (Dave Gregory)– Mellotron, piano, organ, fuzz-tone guitar
- E.I.E.I. Owen (Ian Gregory) – drums on all tracks except "Pale and Precious"
- Lily Fraser – narration

Production

- Produced by John Leckie and The Dukes
