= This World Over =

- Cover art of 7-inch single

Single by XTC

from the album The Big Express
- B-side: "Blue Overall"
- Released: 29 October 1984
- Recorded: 1984
- Length: 5:37 (album version); 4:46 (single version); 3:13 (home demo)
- Label: Virgin
- Songwriter: Andy Partridge
- Producers: David Lord, XTC

XTC singles chronology
"All You Pretty Girls" (1984)	"This World Over" (1984)	"Wake Up" (1984)

Music video
- "This World Over" on YouTube

"This World Over" is a song by the English rock band XTC, written by Andy Partridge, and the second single from their 1984 album The Big Express. It reached number 99 on the UK Singles Chart during a one-week stay.

== Background and lyrics ==
"This World Over" is a song protesting the use of nuclear weapons as a reaction to recent speeches by Ronald Reagan, which instigated Partridge's fears of another Cold War. According to Partridge, "My first child was on the way and [I] just thought that, if I survived, how terrible it would be to have to tell her what life used to be like, that there was once a place called London and it was a fantastic place but it's not there anymore." It is one of two politically-charged songs on the album, the other being "Reign of Blows".

== Recording ==
All of the drum sounds are pre-recorded samples. One of the guitar parts is a slew of sustained feedback notes played through a Marshall amplifier. The "high stratospheric squeaking noises in the last verse", Partridge said, are viola harmonics played by session musician Stuart Gordon, who "saws the bow over at a harmonic point, very whistly, and that was put into a [Roland] Chorus Echo. Glorious, reminiscent of birds and ... grand things."

== Reception ==
In the magazine Smash Hits, guest writer Morrissey penned a review of the song that stated "XTC have stepped back from music industry machinations and are making better records."

== Charts ==
Chart (1985)	Peak position
UK Singles (OCC)	99
