= Ian Reid (talent manager) =

English businessman

- Occupation: Talent manager

Ian Reid is an English businessman, formerly a talent manager known for his association with the rock band XTC. He was originally the owner of a Swindon club named The Affair. After becoming XTC's third manager in the mid 1970s, he brokered deals for the group to perform at more popular venues such as the Hammersmith Red Cow, The Nashville Rooms and Islington's Hope And Anchor, which led them to a major label contract with Virgin Records.

He remained XTC's manager until 1982, when it was discovered that he had mishandled their revenue stream. Once it was apparent, a lawsuit was filed by the band, while he counter-sued for "unpaid commission on royalties." For the next decade, the entirety of the group's earnings would be invested in the continued litigation. Despite a gag order that restricts the group from speaking publicly on the alleged improprieties, Andy Partridge's 1984 song "I Bought Myself a Liarbird" was written about Reid. A court settlement was ultimately reached in 1989.
