= Thanks for Christmas =

Single by the Three Wise Men
- B-side: "Countdown to Christmas Party Time"
- Released: 1983
- Recorded: 1983
- Studio: Crescent Studios, Bath
- Genre: Christmas
- Length: 3:52
- Label: Virgin
- Songwriter: Andy Partridge
- Producers: The Three Wise Men, The Good Lord

XTC singles chronology
"Love on a Farmboy's Wages" (1983)	"Thanks for Christmas" (1983)	"All You Pretty Girls" (1984)

"Thanks for Christmas" is a song by the English band XTC, credited as "the Three Wise Men" and written by Andy Partridge It was released by Virgin Records in late 1983 as a holiday single backed with "Countdown to Christmas Party Time". The song made its first album appearance on the 1990 compilation album Rag and Bone Buffet: Rare Cuts and Leftovers.

== Overview ==
"Thanks for Christmas" was a novelty song recorded to test Crescent Studios owner David Lord's potential as a producer for XTC. It was recorded in late 1983, shortly before sessions commenced for the album The Big Express (1984). Originally, the group wanted to be credited as "the Virgin Marys" for the single, but the record label objected. According to Partridge, "I like the idea of anonymous music, and I thought I'd put together a song and then find an act to do it." It is the only instance in the band's catalog where Partridge and Moulding share lead vocals.

Another song, "Countdown to Christmas Party Time", was recorded as the single's B-side. Partridge described the song as "all-out stupid funky" and "ersatz Michael Jackson or something". Erica Wexler contributed backing vocals and David Lord is credited as "The Good Lord" on the record sleeve.

== Personnel ==
XTC

- Andy Partridge
- Colin Moulding
- Dave Gregory

== Cover versions ==
In December 2022 american alternative rock band Lazlo Bane released a music video for the song. Darlene Love recorded a version of Thanks for Christmas .
