= Drums and Wireless: BBC Radio Sessions 77–89 =

Compilation album by XTC
- Released: 5 October 1994
- Recorded: 1977–1989
- Genre: New wave; pop rock
- Length: 61:33
- Label: Windsong International

XTC other chronology
BBC Radio 1 Live in Concert (1992)	Drums and Wireless: BBC Radio Sessions 77–89 (1994)	A Testimonial Dinner: The Songs of XTC (1995)

Drums and Wireless: BBC Radio Sessions 77–89 is a compilation album by the English rock band XTC, released by Windsong International in October 1994. It contains a selection of songs recorded for BBC Radio between 1977 and 1989. Its tracks were later included on the 4-disc boxed set Transistor Blast: The Best of the BBC Sessions in 1998.

== Critical reception ==
Professional ratings
Review scores
Source	Rating
AllMusic	3/5 stars

Chris Woodstra of AllMusic felt that the compilation "does a good job" of collecting most of XTC's BBC appearances, saying, "While many band's BBC sessions differ only slightly from the studio recordings, XTC was able to stretch out on their sessions for significantly different interpretations."

== Track listing ==
All tracks are written by Andy Partridge, except where noted.

No.	Title	Writer(s)	Length
1.	"Opening Speech" (John Peel Show; recorded 8 October 1979)		0:48
2.	"No Thugs in Our House" (David "Kid" Jensen Show; recorded 14 January 1982)		5:24
3.	"Runaways" (David "Kid" Jensen Show; recorded 14 January 1982)	Colin Moulding	4:42
4.	"You're the Wish You Are I Had" (Bruno Brookes Show; recorded 11 October 1984)		3:26
5.	"Poor Skeleton Steps Out" (Richard Skinner Show; recorded 16 March 1989)		3:26
6.	"Crosswires" (John Peel Show; recorded 21 September 1977)	Moulding	2:10
7.	"Seagulls Screaming Kiss Her, Kiss Her" (Bruno Brookes Show; recorded 11 October 1984)		4:21
8.	"Real By Reel" (John Peel Show; recorded 8 October 1979)		3:48
9.	"Into the Atom Age" (John Peel Show; recorded 21 September 1977)		2:27
10.	"Meccanik Dancing (Oh We Go!)" (John Peel Show; recorded 13 November 1978)		2:35
11.	"Ten Feet Tall" (John Peel Show; recorded 8 October 1979)	Moulding	2:55
12.	"Scarecrow People" (Richard Skinner Show; recorded 16 March 1989)		4:11
13.	"I'm Bugged" (John Peel Show; recorded 21 September 1977)		3:34
14.	"Dance Band" (John Peel Show; recorded 21 September 1977)	Moulding	2:41
15.	"Jason and the Argonauts" (David "Kid" Jensen Show; recorded 14 January 1982)		5:42
16.	"One of the Millions" (Andy Kershaw Show; recorded 16 March 1989)	Moulding	4:25
17.	"Roads Girdle the Globe" (John Peel Show; recorded 8 October 1979)		4:58

== Personnel ==
Credits adapted from the album's liner notes.

XTC

- Andy Partridge – vocals, guitar, keyboards, zippy zither, drum programming
- Colin Moulding – vocals, bass
- Barry Andrews – keyboards (1977–1978)
- Terry Chambers – drums (1977–1982)
- Dave Gregory – guitar, keyboards, drum programming, vocals (1979–1989)

Technical

- Tony Wilson – producer (1, 8, 10, 11, 17)
- John Sparrow – producer (2, 3, 15)
- Dale Griffin – producer (4, 7)
- Peter Watts – producer (5, 12, 16)
- Malcolm Brown – producer (6, 9, 13, 14)
- Dave Dade – engineer (1, 6, 8–10, 11, 13, 14, 17)
- Mike Robinson – engineer (2, 3, 15)
- Ted De Bono – engineer (4, 5, 7, 12, 16)
- Tim Durham – engineer (5, 12, 16)
- Rian Hughes – design
