= All You Pretty Girls =

Single by XTC

from the album The Big Express
- B-side: "Washaway"; "Red Brick Dream" (12")
- Released: 3 September 1984
- Recorded: 1984
- Length: 3:40 (album version); 4:00 (single version); 4:13 (home demo)
- Label: Virgin
- Songwriter(s): Andy Partridge
- Producer(s): David Lord, XTC

XTC singles chronology
"Thanks for Christmas" (1983)	"All You Pretty Girls" (1984)	"This World Over" (1984)

"All You Pretty Girls" is a song written by Andy Partridge of the English rock band XTC, released on their 1984 album The Big Express. It peaked at number 55 on the UK Singles Chart, and its music video cost £33,000 to make. Partridge remembers that song came about while he was "dicking around, playing some Hendrix. ... I was just playing this little two-note, quasi-Hendrix thing, and I liked the inherent melody in it."

With the exception of the opening, all the drum sounds in the recording were made with a LinnDrum. The choir sounds were a Mellotron sample played out of a speaker inside a fire bucket.

== Song style and content ==
The song's lyrics tell the story of a sailor asking a shipmate to — if the sailor should die — write a note and throw it overboard, with a message thanking all the women who wait at the docks for the sailor's return. The song's chorus, listing the types of women waiting, is deliberately performed in the style of a sea shanty, which turns into a hornpipe-styled coda utilising a complex harmonic counterpoint of non-lexical vocables which also suggest a nautical work song.

== Music video ==
The song was accompanied by a video which depicted the band in period costume as singers in a traditional music hall or theatrical production, dressed as sailors. By the end of the video, they are shown being press-ganged into service in the navy.

== Personnel ==
XTC

- Dave Gregory – keyboards, backing vocals
- Colin Moulding — bass, backing vocals
- Andy Partridge — guitar, lead and backing vocals

Additional personnel

- Pete Phipps – drums

== Charts ==
Chart (1984)	Peak position
Australia (Kent Music Report)	76
UK Singles (OCC)	55
