= Seagulls Screaming Kiss Her Kiss Her =

- Partridge's illustration of the song's visual imagery, drawn before he wrote the lyrics

Song by XTC

from the album The Big Express
- Written: 1981–1984
- Released: 15 October 1984
- Recorded: 1984
- Studio: Crescent Studios (Bath); Odyssey Studios (London)
- Length: 3:50
- Label: Virgin
- Songwriter: Andy Partridge
- Producers: David Lord; XTC

Audio sample
- file; help

"Seagulls Screaming Kiss Her Kiss Her" is a song written by Andy Partridge of the English rock band XTC, released on their seventh studio album The Big Express (1984). Composed on a Mellotron using only three fingers, it was the first song he wrote on a keyboard instrument. The lyrics were inspired by Erica Wexler, a fan who caused tensions with Partridge's then-wife. After his divorce, Partridge married Wexler in the 1990s. The Japanese rock band Seagull Screaming Kiss Her Kiss Her named themselves after the song.

== Inspiration and composition ==
Like other tracks on The Big Express, "Seagulls Screaming Kiss Her Kiss Her" is a seaside-themed song. It germinated from a piano riff found during the 1981 sessions for English Settlement and later composed on the band's Mellotron using only three fingers, becoming the first song Partridge wrote on a keyboard. He drew illustrations of the "Seagulls" imagery before he wrote its lyrics and recalled having the 1971 Joe Cocker song "Marjorine" in mind when he wrote it. Commenting on its "dream-like" structure, he said that he wrote the "flags that flap on the pier" section to "break up the reoccurrence of that continuing melody." A demo was recorded in his bedroom: "the shape of it is all there -- kind of how I wanted it to go. It was just refining the sounds, you know."

The lyrics to "Seagulls" were about Roy Lichtenstein's then-girlfriend Erica Wexler, who would later become Partridge's wife. Partridge met Wexler at the US premiere of the 1980 film Times Square and remembered: "I didn't want to think of it as love at first sight, because I'd only been married for something like six months, so it was a bit painful, you know? It was like, "'Shit! I'm married!" Wexler mailed Partridge fan letters, which caused tensions between him and his then-wife, whereas fellow band member Dave Gregory nicknamed her "Whacky Wex". She also inspired "You're the Wish You Are I Had" from The Big Express and "Another Satellite" from 1986's Skylarking.

Partridge performed "Seagulls" for Wexler on the day that she visited the band in the studio. He said:

I actually sat at the piano and played it to her, and tried my best to sing it at the same time. And she must have thought, "Well, hell -- if he's not going to take the opportunity, I sure am!" And she leaned in to kiss me, sat next to me on the piano seat, as I'm playing her this song, and I thought, "Oh my god!" and just, true to type -- and the fact that I was married, and didn't want to fuck up my marriage -- I leaned right out, scared shitless, and sort of immediately said, [fast] "Oh, well, I've still got a lot of work to do on that, and let's go into the control room, shall we?"

== Recording ==
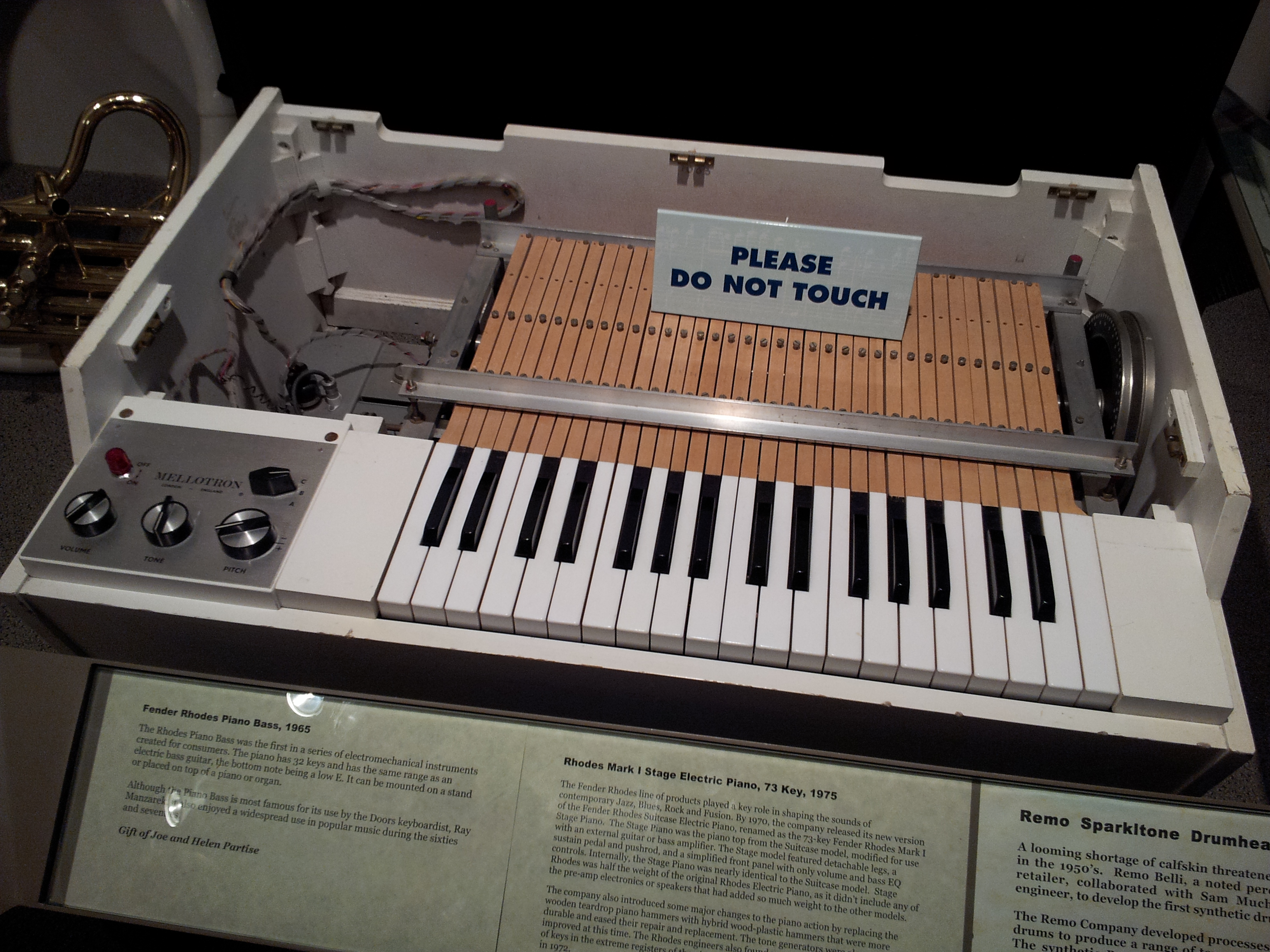
The song's keyboard sounds came from a string section sampled on a Mellotron.

"Seagulls" was recorded at Crescent Studios in Bath and Odyssey Sound in London. Bassist Colin Moulding played his newly purchased Wal bass and session musician Steve Saunders, known for his work with Michael Nyman, played a euphonium solo. Producer David Lord and guitarist Dave Gregory voiced concerns about the discordant harmony in "Seagulls", but Partridge refused to change it. The drum sounds came from a programmed LinnDrum to meet his desire for a "sense of disparate percussion". A mixed thumb piano and wood block sample is played on every seventh beat. In the bridge, there is the sound of a LinnDrum's tom-tom sample tuned down "with a fuck of a lot of reverb" to sound like the firing of coastal artillery.

== Planned music video ==
Although "Seagulls" was never released as a single and no music video was created for the song, Partridge planned out potential sleeve designs and a concept for a video. He explained the premise:

... there were masked people, who had these big flat semi-Picasso-like masks. They were stood in a big desolate landscape near the sea, and a sort of proscenium across the top was constantly scrolling, changing the different images that were either telling the story with you, or contradicting what was going on. And then there was also the opposite of that, a band across the bottom that was scrolling the other way, which was either completing the imagery or contradicting what was going on.

== Critical reception ==
Partridge regarded "Seagulls" as his favourite XTC song for several years. In a retrospective review of The Big Express, Dave Jennings of Louder Than War highlighted "Seagulls" as "reason enough to label this album as 'classic'."

Japanese band Seagull Screaming Kiss Her Kiss Her named themselves after the song.

== Personnel ==
XTC

- Dave Gregory – Mellotron, synthesizer
- Colin Moulding – bass guitar
- Andy Partridge – vocals, LinnDrum

Additional musicians

- Steve Saunders – euphonium

== Variants ==
- BBC Radio version, released on Drums and Wireless: BBC Radio Sessions 77–89 (1994)
- Home demo version, released on Fuzzy Warbles Volume 7 (2006)

== Cover versions ==
- 1997 – Naoyuki Isogai, Chalkhills Children Tribute Tape 1997
