= 25 O'Clock =

Studio album (mini-LP) by the Dukes of Stratosphear
- Released: 1 April 1985
- Recorded: December 1984
- Studio: Chapel Lane (Hereford)
- Genres: Neo-psychedelia; avant-pop
- Length: 26:43
- Label: Virgin
- Producers: John Leckie; the Dukes of Stratosphear

XTC chronology
The Big Express (1984)	25 O'Clock (1985)	Skylarking (1986)

Singles from 25 O'Clock
- 1. "The Mole from the Ministry" / "My Love Explodes" Released: April 1985

25 O'Clock is the debut record by the English rock band the Dukes of Stratosphear and the eighth studio album by XTC, released on April Fools Day 1985 through Virgin Records. It was publicised as a long-lost collection of recordings by a late 1960s group, but actually consisted of new tracks recorded by Andy Partridge, Colin Moulding, and Dave Gregory of XTC with Gregory's brother Ian on drums.

The project was conceived by Partridge as a one-off excursion into 1960s-style psychedelic music. Three rules were set during its recording: songs must follow the conventions of 1967 and 1968 psychedelia, no more than two takes of each song were allowed, and the band had to use vintage equipment wherever possible. Virgin gave the group £5,000 and a two-week deadline for the sessions, in which the members adopted pseudonyms and dressed in period clothing. Only six tracks were recorded due to time constraints.

Upon its release in the UK, 25 O'Clock sold twice as many copies as XTC's album The Big Express (1984) had in the country, even before the Dukes' identity was made public. One single was issued, the Beatles pastiche "The Mole from the Ministry", with an accompanying music video. 25 O'Clock was followed in 1987 by the LP Psonic Psunspot, which contained the outtake "Have You Seen Jackie?". Another outtake, "Big Day", was reworked for XTC's 1986 album Skylarking.

25 O'Clock and Psonic Psunspot were later collected on the CD compilation Chips from the Chocolate Fireball.

== Background ==
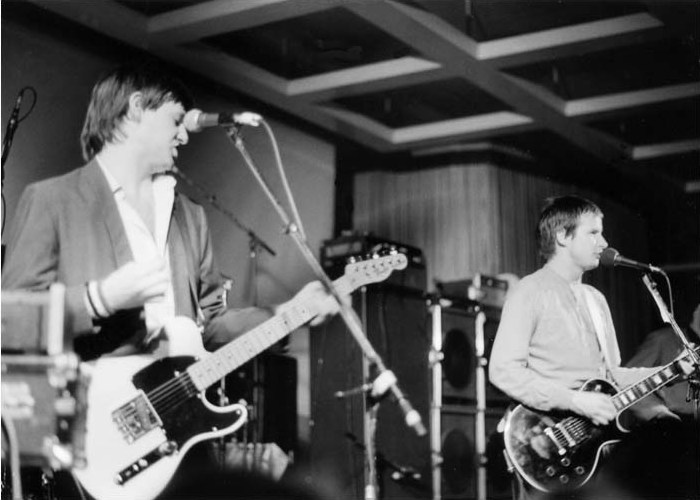
Dave Gregory (left) and Andy Partridge (right) performing with XTC

When guitarist Dave Gregory was invited to join XTC in 1979, bandleader and songwriter Andy Partridge learned that they both shared a longtime passion for 1960s psychedelic music. An album of songs in that style was immediately put to consideration, but the group could not go through with it due to their commercial obligations to Virgin Records. Another consideration Partridge had was the punk movement's antipathy toward pop music of the past. XTC stopped touring in 1982 and immediately began focusing on refining their sound in the studio. During the making of their 1984 album The Big Express, Partridge began writing material he thought could potentially be performed in a psychedelic style, the first being "Your Gold Dress". He recalled "beginning [to be unable] to contain the desire to do this. You can see it leaking out earlier".

In November 1984, one month after the release of The Big Express, Partridge traveled to Monmouth, Wales with engineer John Leckie to produce the album Miss America by singer-songwriter Mary Margaret O'Hara, who had recently signed with Virgin. Partridge and Leckie were dismissed due to conflicts related to their religious affiliations or lack thereof, as O'Hara was a devout Catholic. Inspired by Nick Nicely's 1982 psychedelic single "Hilly Fields (1892)", Partridge devised a recording project to fill the newfound gap in his schedule. The rules were as follows: songs must follow the conventions of 1967 and 1968 psychedelia; no more than two takes of each track were allowed; and vintage equipment was to be used wherever possible. Partridge said: "I didn't really have songs ready, just ideas. I knew I wanted to do something like Syd Barrett. Perhaps a Beatles-esque track. ... I rung up the other guys and said 'Hey, let's put on a show!'; you know, that kind of thing."

== Recording ==
Leckie agreed to take on production duties and searched for a cheap studio for the band. Partridge invited his XTC bandmates to participate; they were augmented on drums by Dave Gregory's brother Ian, since the group did not have a drummer following the departure of Terry Chambers. The song "25 O'Clock" was quickly written as they waited for the project to be greenlit by Virgin. After the label reluctantly loaned the group £5,000 (equivalent to £16,285 in 2025), two weeks were spent on the album's recording and mixing at Chapel Lane Studios in Hereford, England. The project was planned as a full-length LP, but only six songs were completed due to time constraints. The album was produced so cheaply that the band refunded £1,000 of the advance back to the label. Partridge looked back on these sessions as the "most fun we ever had in the studio."

"The Mole from the Ministry"
The album's only single, "The Mole from the Ministry", was an improvised-in-the-studio Beatles pastiche.

Each musician adopted a pseudonym: "Sir John Johns" (Partridge), "Lord Cornelius Plum" (Dave Gregory), "The Red Curtain" (Colin Moulding), and "E.I.E.I. Owen" (Ian Gregory). Partridge's moniker was inspired by DC Comics character the Martian Manhunter's name (J'onn J'onzz), while Moulding's was derived from an old nickname referring to the length of his hair. The band dressed themselves in Paisley outfits for the sessions and lit scented candles. According to Partridge, "Dave Gregory took to the Dukes a bit too much. Elephant jumbo cord flares, big white belt, beads - we were a bit worried." In contrast to himself and Gregory, "Colin was more of a heavy metal kid. He was more into Black Sabbath and Uriah Heep and people like that. So he didn't really have much of a grasp on psychedelia."

"25 O'Clock" and "Bike Ride to the Moon" were direct pastiches of the Electric Prunes' "I Had Too Much to Dream (Last Night)" (1966) and Tomorrow's "My White Bicycle" (1967), respectively. One of the "best bits on the EP," Partridge later said, was Moulding's "What in the World??...", which featured tape manipulation akin to the Beatles' "Only a Northern Song" (1969). Moulding offered another song, "Big Day", but the group deemed it good enough for the next XTC album, Skylarking (1986): "The Dukes thing was written in an air of 'Well, it doesn't really matter, we'll tart it all up in the mix.'" The song "Have You Seen Jackie?" was also left off the album, later being included on the full-length Dukes LP Psonic Psunspot.

== Release ==
Professional ratings
Retrospective reviews
Review scores
Source	Rating
AllMusic	4.5/5 stars
The Encyclopedia of Popular Music	5/5 stars
Pitchfork	7.7/10

Released exclusively in Britain on April Fool's Day 1985, the mini-album was presented as a long-lost collection of recordings by a late 1960s group. Partridge designed its cover art on his kitchen table using colored pens and photocopied 19th-century lettering. Virgin Records publicised the Dukes as a mysterious new act, and when asked about the album in interviews, XTC initially denied having any involvement. A music video set to "The Mole from the Ministry"—the first in which they were allowed total creative input—was produced for BBC West's RPM music programme. Partridge: "That's the only one of our videos that I've liked, the only one I can watch ... every little [promo] film [from 1967] we could find, we put ideas from them in there."

In England, 25 O'Clock sold twice as many copies as The Big Express, even before the Dukes' identity was made public. The album also achieved considerable sales in the US. On XTC's next album, Skylarking, the Dukes were thanked in the liner notes.

== Track listing ==
=== Original mini-album ===
All tracks are written by Andy Partridge except "What in the World??...", by Colin Moulding.

Side one
No.	Title	Length
1.	"25 O'Clock"	5:01
2.	"Bike Ride to the Moon"	2:24
3.	"My Love Explodes"	3:54

Side two
No.	Title	Length
1.	"What in the World??..."	5:01
2.	"Your Gold Dress"	4:38
3.	"The Mole from the Ministry"	5:50

=== Expanded edition ===
A remastered and expanded version of 25 O'Clock was released on 20 April 2009 by Partridge's Ape House record label. This edition of 25 O'Clock is credited to "XTC as The Dukes of Stratosphear". It also included the promotional video for "The Mole from the Ministry" as a QuickTime file.

2009 CD bonus tracks
No.	Title	Length
7.	"25 O'Clock (Demo)"	2:25
8.	"Bike Ride to the Moon (Demo)"	1:30
9.	"My Love Explodes (Demo)"	1:54
10.	"What in the World??... (Demo)"	3:40
11.	"Nicely Nicely Jane (Demo)"	1:17
12.	"Susan Revolving (Demo)"	1:24
13.	"Black Jewelled Serpent of Sound (Radio Caroline Edit)"	2:17
14.	"Open a Can of Human Beans"	4:44
15.	"Tin Toy Clockwork Train"	3:17

== Personnel ==
Credits adapted from the album's liner notes.

The Dukes of Stratosphear

- Sir John Johns (Andy Partridge) – vocals, guitar, bass guitar on "What in the World??...", sleeve art
- The Red Curtain (Colin Moulding) – vocals, bass guitar, guitar on "What in the World??..."
- Lord Cornelius Plum (Dave Gregory) – Mellotron, piano, organ, fuzz-tone guitar
- E.I.E.I. Owen (Ian "Eewee" Gregory) – drums

Technical

- John Leckie – producer, engineer
- Swami Anand Nagara (John Leckie) – producer
- The Dukes of Stratosphear – producer
