= Seagull Screaming Kiss Her Kiss Her =

Japanese rock band

- From left: Karashima, Higurashi, and Koyama.

Background information
- Origin: New York City, U.S.
- Genres: Alternative rock; noise rock
- Years active: 1992–2002; 2014–present
- Labels: Trumpet Trumpet Records; Cardinal Records; Polystar Co., Ltd.; Hate It, Damn It Records
- Members: Aiha Higurashi; Masayuki Hasuo; Yuta Ichinose; Naoko Okamoto; Kentaro Nakao; Moe Wadaka; Masayuki Hasuo
- Past members: Sachiko Ito; Nao Koyama; Takaharu "Takape" Karashima

Seagull Screaming Kiss Her Kiss Her is a Japanese rock band formed by guitarist Aiha Higurashi in 1992. Beginning as a two-girl band in New York City with her friend Sachiko Ito, it was not until after they had played a few shows that the band got its name, which was lifted from the 1984 song "Seagulls Screaming Kiss Her Kiss Her" by XTC. Aiha returned to Tokyo solo in 1994 where she enlisted bassist and vocalist Nao Koyama and drummer Takaharu "Takape" Karashima. Karashima left the band after recording Pretty In Pink in 1999.

== Discography ==
Studio albums

- Give Them Back to Me (1996)
- It's Brand New (1997)
- 17 (1998)
- No! No! No! (2000)
- No! No! No Star 2000 (2000)
- Future or No Future (2001)
- Eternal Adolescence (2015)
