= Psonic Psunspot =

Studio album by the Dukes of Stratosphear
- Released: August 1987
- Recorded: June 1987
- Studios: Sawmills (Fowey, Cornwall)
- Genres: Avant-pop; neo-psychedelia
- Length: 35:44
- Label: Virgin
- Producers: John Leckie, The Dukes of Stratosphear

XTC chronology
Skylarking (1986)	Psonic Psunspot (1987)	Oranges & Lemons (1989)

Singles from Psonic Psunspot
- 1. "You're a Good Man Albert Brown (Curse You Red Barrel)/Vanishing Girl" Released: July 1987

Professional ratings
Review scores
Source	Rating
AllMusic	4/5 stars
Robert Christgau	B+
The Encyclopedia of Popular Music	5/5 stars
Pitchfork	8.4/10
Q	4/5 stars

Psonic Psunspot is the second album by the English rock band the Dukes of Stratosphear, released in 1987. Also counted as XTC's tenth studio album, it is a follow-up to 25 O'Clock (1985).

In 2002, the website Pitchfork listed the album at 66 on their "Top 100 Albums of the 1980s", calling the songs "a surreal rock-opera of opaque, hallucinogenic wonder".

== Music ==
Some of its tracks were rejected XTC songs ("Shiny Cage", "Little Lighthouse", and "You're My Drug"). Like the previous album 25 O'Clock, this album is inspired by 1960s psychedelia.

== Release ==
The album was released in its original form on vinyl and cassette, accompanied with the "You're A Good Man Albert Brown" single and the promotional-only "Vanishing Girl" single. A simultaneous CD release entitled Chips from the Chocolate Fireball incorporated all of the tracks from 25 O'Clock and Psonic Psunspot with different packaging. Later, a remastered and expanded version of Psonic Psunspot was released on 20 April 2009 by Andy Partridge's Ape House record label. This edition is credited to "XTC as The Dukes of Stratosphear".

== Track listing ==
All songs written and composed by Andy Partridge, except where noted.

Side A ("In Side")
No.	Title	Writer(s)	Length
1.	"Vanishing Girl"	Colin Moulding	2:45
2.	"Have You Seen Jackie?"		3:21
3.	"Little Lighthouse"		4:31
4.	"You're a Good Man Albert Brown (Curse You Red Barrel)"		3:39
5.	"Collideascope"		3:22

Side B ("Out Side")
No.	Title	Writer(s)	Length
1.	"You're My Drug"		3:20
2.	"Shiny Cage"	Moulding	3:17
3.	"Brainiac's Daughter"		4:04
4.	"The Affiliated"	Moulding	2:31
5.	"Pale and Precious"		4:54

2009 CD bonus tracks (APECD024)
No.	Title	Writer(s)	Length
11.	"No One at Home (Vanishing Girl Demo)"	Moulding	2:51
12.	"Little Lighthouse (Demo)"		5:19
13.	"Collideascope (Demo)"		3:05
14.	"Shiny Cage (Demo)"	Moulding	3:13
15.	"Brainiacs Daughter (Demo)"		1:49
16.	"The Affiliated (Demo)"	Moulding	2:30

Also includes the promotional video for "You're a Good Man Albert Brown (Curse You Red Barrel)" as a QuickTime file.

== Personnel ==
- Sir John Johns (Andy Partridge) – vocals, guitar; bass guitar on "Vanishing Girl"; drums on "Pale and Precious"
- The Red Curtain (Colin Moulding) – bass guitar, vocals; rhythm guitar on "Vanishing Girl"
- Lord Cornelius Plum (Dave Gregory) – Mellotron, piano, organ, fuzz-tone guitar
- E.I.E.I. Owen (Ian Gregory) – drums on all tracks except "Pale and Precious"
- Lily Fraser – narration
- Produced by John Leckie and The Dukes
