= Dear God (XTC song) =

1987 single by XTC

- 1987 A-sided reissue cover

Single by XTC
- A-side: "Grass"
- Released: 16 August 1986
- Recorded: 1986
- Genre: Pop
- Length: 3:34; 4:10 (band demo version)
- Label: Virgin
- Songwriter: Andy Partridge
- Producer: Todd Rundgren

XTC singles chronology
"The Meeting Place" (1987)	"Dear God" (1986)	"You're a Good Man Albert Brown (Curse You Red Barrel)" (1987)

Music video
- "Dear God" on YouTube

"Dear God" is a song by the English rock band XTC that was first released as a non-album single with the A-side "Grass". Written by Andy Partridge, the song lyrics grapple with the existence of God and the problem of evil. Partridge was inspired by a series of books with the same title, which Partridge viewed as exploitative of children. The song was originally intended for the album Skylarking, but left off due to concerns from Partridge and Virgin Records. After college radio DJs across America picked up the song, US distributor Geffen Records recalled and re-pressed Skylarking with the track included.

Partridge was dissatisfied with "Dear God" as he felt the lyrics were not representative of his views on religion, which was partly the reason it was left off Skylarking. The song's anti-religious message ultimately provoked some violent reactions. In the US, one radio station received a bomb threat, and in another incident, a student forced their school to play the song over its public-address system while holding a faculty member hostage. Partridge also received a plethora of hate mail. He stated that he "felt sorry" for whomever he upset; however, "if you can't have a different opinion without them wanting to firebomb your house, then that's their problem."

The music video for "Dear God", one of the first to be directed by photographer Nick Brandt, received the 1987 Billboard Best Video award and was also nominated for three categories at the MTV Video Music Awards. In 2009, the song was ranked at No. 62 on VH1's 100 Greatest One Hit Wonders of the 80s, despite the fact that XTC had higher charting singles in the decade. In 2011, Todd Rundgren, who produced the original XTC recording of the song, recorded a cover version for his album (re)Production.

== Background ==
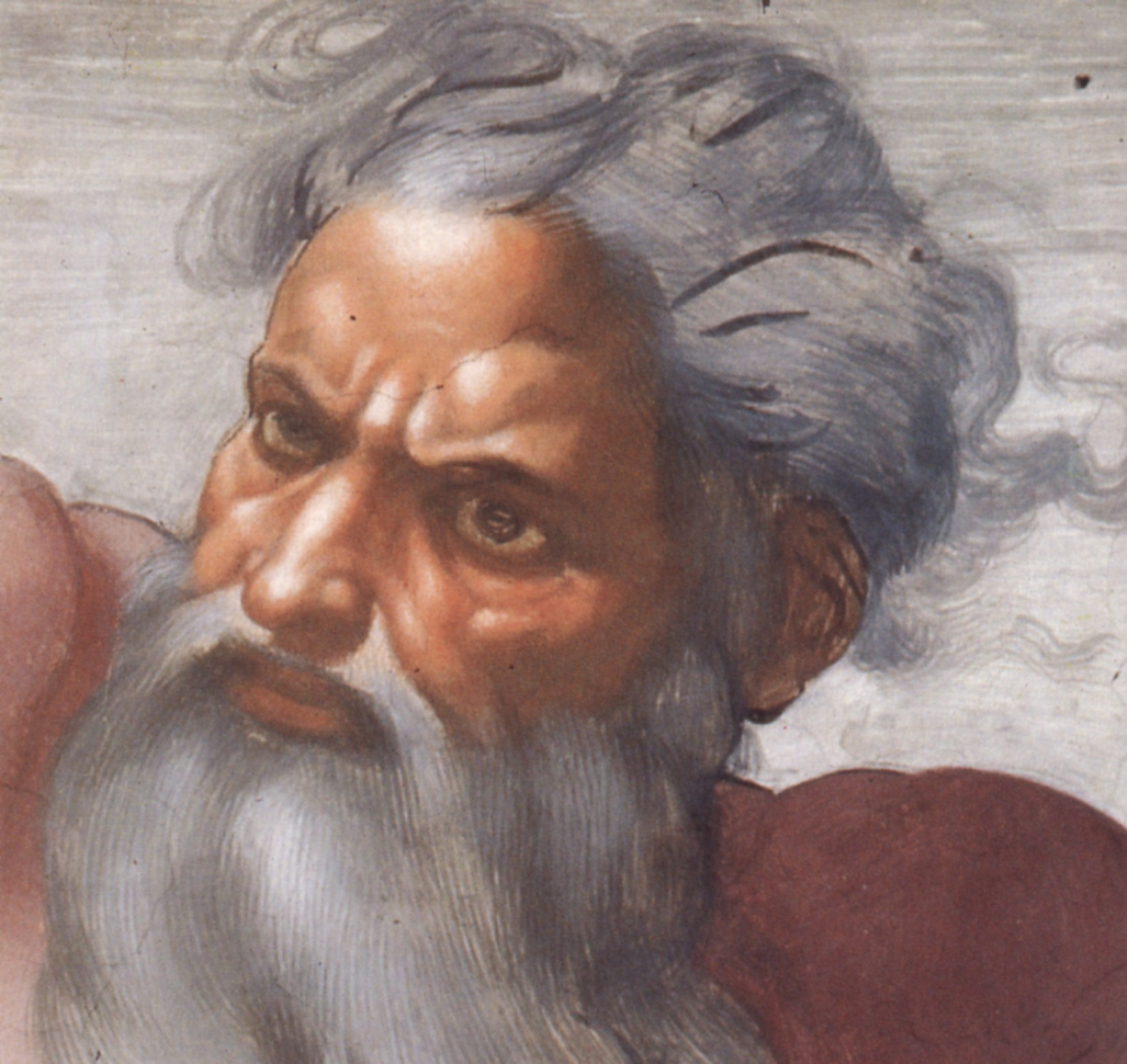
Partridge claimed that, as a child, he once received a vision of a "classic Renaissance picture of God", but his reaction was only to become less religious.

"Dear God" is about an agnostic who writes a letter to God while challenging his existence. The lyrical theme was inspired by a series of books written by David Heller with the same title, seen by Partridge as exploitation of children. Accordingly:

It's such a vast subject -- human belief, the need for humans to believe the stuff they do, and the many strata involved, the many layers of religion and belief and whatnot. ... also a big subject for me, because I think it'd been bugging me for many years. I'd struggled with the concept of God and Man and so on since I was a kid, even to the point where I got myself so worked up with worry about religion that -- around about the age of 7 or 8 on a summer's day -- I saw the clouds part and, you know, there was this sort of classic Renaissance picture of God surrounded by his angels looking at me scornfully.

Though I thought those Dear God books -- you know, kids' letters to God -- were a pretty tacky concept, I liked the title. I liked the idea of writing to God to address the fact that I didn't believe he existed. I just wanted the thing to come back with an angelic stamp on it, saying "Return to Sender." Written in fiery letters!

He conceived the music in a skiffle style but while playing the Beatles' "Rocky Raccoon", Partridge was inspired to move "Dear God" closer to that song's direction. The string section was intended to evoke "a sort of a Gershwin-y, blues-y, 'Summertime' feel." Skylarking producer Todd Rundgren suggested hiring a child to sing the first verse and closing line. He brought in eight-year-old Jasmine Veillette, the daughter of a friend of Rundgren. However, a boy lip-syncs her vocals in the music video.

== Release ==
The track did not appear on initial pressings of Skylarking, but was included as part of the album's original planned running order, which was sequenced by Rundgren. According to Partridge, the track had been left off the album because Virgin A&R executive Jeremy Lascelles was concerned about the album's length, and Partridge was advised that the song may upset American audiences; "I reluctantly agreed because I thought I hadn't written a strong enough take on religion. I thought I'd kind of failed." Rundgren had a different recollection, and said that Partridge demanded that the song be pulled because "He was afraid that there would be repercussions personally for him for taking on such a thorny subject. ... I called them and said, 'This is a mistake.'" Partridge denied such accusations: "if you can't have a different opinion without [somebody] wanting to firebomb your house then that's their problem."

Instead, "Dear God" was relegated as the UK-only B-side to Skylarking lead single "Grass". It found popularity with American college radio DJs who imported the single. US distributor Geffen Records were then "bombarded with enquiries about a song of which they knew nothing, recalled the album and re-pressed it with Dear God reinstated." In June 1987, "Dear God" was reissued as an A-sided single in both markets, reaching number 99 in the UK and failing to chart in the US. Its success propelled Skylarking to sell more than 250,000 units. An EP version of this single includes the whole Homo Safaris Series No. 1 through No. 6.

=== Controversy ===
I got all the hate mail and the booklets ... Somebody sent me one of those books called -- and I've still got it, because I thought the title of it was fantastic -- You Can Live Forever in Paradise on Earth. And I thought, "Wow!"

— Andy Partridge

The song's anti-religious message inspired some violent incidents. In Florida, a Panama City radio station received a bomb threat for playing the song, and in New York, a Binghamton High School student forced his school to play the song over its public-address system while holding a faculty member at knifepoint. Some British shops refused to carry the single. Partridge also received a plethora of hate mail, all from the US. He commented: "I really felt sorry for the people who got so upset at someone expressing an opinion that might be contrary to their beliefs, or at who might have another take on their beliefs. How could that make them so violent, potentially?"

Although Partridge is an atheist, he believes that heaven and hell exist metaphorically. "Season Cycle", another song from Skylarking, included the couplet "Everybody says, Join our religion, get to heaven / I say, no thanks, why bless my soul, I'm already there!" He returned to biblical themes for "Garden of Earthly Delights", a children's guide to the world that served as the opening track on their follow-up album, Oranges & Lemons (1989). Explaining the lyric "do what you want to do / just don't hurt nobody", he said: "I'm sure that's what heaven is, really. Heaven is not hurting anyone."

== Personnel ==
XTC

- Dave Gregory – electric guitar
- Colin Moulding – bass guitar
- Andy Partridge – acoustic guitar, vocals

Additional personnel

- Prairie Prince – drums
- Jasmine Veillette – vocals

Per Partridge.

== Chart positions ==
Chart performance for "Dear God"
Chart (1987)	Peak position
UK Singles Chart	99
US Billboard Album Rock Chart	37
