= Grass (XTC song) =

Single by XTC

from the album Skylarking
- B-side: "Dear God"
- Released: 16 August 1986
- Recorded: 1986
- Genre: Psychedelic pop
- Length: 3:05 (album version); 2:42 (single version); 2:55 (home demo version)
- Label: Virgin
- Songwriter(s): Colin Moulding
- Producer(s): Todd Rundgren

XTC singles chronology
"The Mole from the Ministry" (1986)	"Grass" (1986)	"The Meeting Place" (1987)

"Grass" is a song written by Colin Moulding of the English rock band XTC, released as the lead single from their 1986 album Skylarking. It reached number 100 on the UK Singles Chart.

== Background ==
"Grass" is sometimes mistaken to be about cannabis, but was actually written about Seven Fields, a parkland in Swindon. Moulding composed it on an open E-tuned guitar and found its harmonic changes by playing the chord shapes of Thunderclap Newman's "Something in the Air" (1969). The mixing of violin and guitar was an idea lifted from John Lennon's "How Do You Sleep?" (1971). Skylarking producer Todd Rundgren added a tiple to the blend. Moulding originally sang the song with a deeper voice. He said Rundgren voiced concern that the effect was too close to "a molester", and so Moulding "did the Bowie thing and added an octave above it".

On Skylarking, the track bookends "Summer's Cauldron" with a reprise of its "insect chorus".

== Personnel ==
XTC

- Dave Gregory
- Colin Moulding
- Andy Partridge

== Charts ==
Chart (1986)	Peak position
UK Singles (OCC)	100
