= King for a Day (XTC song) =

Single by XTC

from the album Oranges & Lemons
- B-side: "Happy Families" (UK); "Toys" (US)
- Released: April 1989
- Recorded: 1989
- Genre: Pop
- Length: 3:36; 3:14 (home demo version)
- Label: Virgin
- Songwriter: Colin Moulding
- Producer: Paul Fox

XTC singles chronology
"Mayor of Simpleton" (1989)	"King for a Day" (1989)	"The Loving" (1989)

Audio sample
- file; help

Official audio
- "King For A Day" on YouTube

"King for a Day" is a song by the English rock band XTC, released on their 1989 album Oranges & Lemons. Written by Colin Moulding, it was the second single from the album and reached number 82 on the UK Singles Chart.

The music video featured a cameo appearance from guitarist Dave Gregory's brother Ian, drummer of the Dukes of Stratosphear. Their performance of the song on Late Night with David Letterman marked the first time XTC had performed live in seven years.

Reviewing the single for Music Week, Jerry Smith called "King For a Day" "another fine song" with a "smooth sound and catchy harmonies".

== Background ==
When deciding suitable songs to record for Oranges & Lemons, Paul Fox, who served as the album's producer, identified "King For a Day" as a song with "radio potential" and encouraged Moulding to include the song in the track listing; Moulding acquiesced on the condition of recording "Cynical Days", a song that he wanted to prioritise. "King For a Day" was amongst the first songs tracked for Oranges and Lemons and began with various programmed percussion loops on a LinnDrum.

Pat Mastelotto recalled that the drums were recorded in a piecemeal fashion by overdubbing the tom-toms, hi-hats, and snare drums individually. For one of the snare drum parts, Mastelotto placed the instrument between his legs and recorded the sound with a Shure SM57 microphone. The waveform, which was loaded onto an Akai sampler, lacked the initial attack and only comprised the resonance of the instrument. Andy Partridge gravitated toward this sound and encouraged Mastelotto to use the sample on "King for a Day", which was layered over another snare drum that Mastelotto recorded by stacking various objects on the instrument.

I'd done that with the Misters, too, where I would take a snare drum and stack a timbale on top of it. It makes the drum too big to use in a kit, of course, but for overdubbing you can make the sucker 5 feet tall. Plus, you can put it wherever you want in the room, move things around to see where you can get the best sound, and you can mic it from many spots and blend the tones.

== Personnel ==
XTC

- Colin Moulding – vocals, bass
- Andy Partridge – vocals, guitar
- Dave Gregory – guitars, backing vocals, keyboards

Additional musicians

- Pat Mastelotto – drums

== Charts ==
Chart (1989)	Peak position
UK Singles (OCC)	82
