= Mayor of Simpleton =

1989 single by XTC

Single by XTC

from the album Oranges & Lemons
- B-side: One of the Millions (7"); The Good Things (CD, 12")
- Released: 16 January 1989
- Genre: Jangle pop
- Length: 3:58; 2:47 (early version)
- Label: Virgin
- Songwriter: Andy Partridge
- Producer: Paul Fox

XTC singles chronology
"You're a Good Man Albert Brown (Curse You Red Barrel)" (1987)	"Mayor of Simpleton" (1989)	"King for a Day" (1989)

Audio sample
- file; help

Music video
- "Mayor of Simpleton" on YouTube

"Mayor of Simpleton" is a song written by Andy Partridge of the English band XTC, released as the first single from their 1989 album Oranges & Lemons. The single reached No. 72 on the Billboard Hot 100 singles chart, No. 1 on its Alternative Songs chart, and No. 15 on its Mainstream Rock chart, becoming the band's best-performing single in the United States.

== Background ==
The song began as a reggae tune and went through numerous iterations. The song began with a sequenced bass part triggered from a keyboard and a programmed kick drum. Once these components were settled, guitars and a scratch vocal were also recorded. The guitar track that appeared on the final recording was performed by Dave Gregory on a twelve-string guitar. Pat Mastelotto, who played drums on the track, recalled that considerable attention was placed on the snare drum tone. Components of the snare drum track were achieved by recording the release of the instrument with a Shure SM57 and loading the sound into an Akai sampler. The device's Warp feature was used to bend the sound of the snare drum sample.

On the waveform that was created, there was no attack – it was all ring. I didn't even catch the front of the sample – and Andy loved it so much that it turned out to be almost on the entire record. We'd painstakingly tune the snare drum to the pitch, and then get this sample to the pitch, and then we'd lock 'em in together. That's on a lot of the songs. I know it's on "Mayor" and on "King for a Day".

— Pat Mastelotto

Partridge settled on its final arrangement after discovering a C major to D major picking pattern that he thought resembled Blue Öyster Cult's "(Don't Fear) The Reaper" (1976). Unlike many other XTC songs, he instructed a specific bass part to Colin Moulding, who replaced the sequenced bass pattern that was previously recorded. "Colin had to work very hard to get that bass line. It's very precise. It took me a long time to work it out, because I wanted to get into the J.S. Bach mode of each note being the perfect counterpoint to where the chords are and where the melody is. The bass is the third part in the puzzle."

While the band was conducting overdubs, Moulding presented a new bass part for the song's coda. This part was a relatively late addition to the song and was integrated after the live drums were recorded. Partridge said that he received criticism for the song's similarity to Sam Cooke's "Wonderful World" (1960), but Partridge denied copying the song intentionally. He said that the lyrics were partially autobiographical and related to his waning interest in school as a teenager.

== Charts ==
Chart (1989)	Peak position
Australia (ARIA)	89
Canada Top Singles (RPM)	42
European Airplay (Music & Media)	48
UK Singles (Official Charts)	46
US Billboard Hot 100	72
US Album Rock Tracks (Billboard)	15
US Modern Rock Tracks (Billboard)	1

== See also ==
- List of Billboard number-one alternative singles of the 1980s
