= Skylarking =

Studio album by XTC
- Released: 27 October 1986
- Recorded: April–June 1986
- Studios: Utopia Sound (Woodstock, New York); The Sound Hole (San Francisco)
- Genres: Pop; rock; psychedelic
- Length: 45:47
- Labels: Virgin (UK); Geffen (US)
- Producer: Todd Rundgren

XTC chronology
25 O'Clock (1985)	Skylarking (1986)	Psonic Psunspot (1987)

Singles from Skylarking
- 1. "Grass" / "Dear God" Released: 16 August 1986; 2. "The Meeting Place" / "The Man Who Sailed Around His Soul" Released: 2 February 1987; 3. "Dear God" / "Big Day" Released: 1 June 1987; 4. "Earn Enough For Us" Released: 1987 (Australia and Canada)

Skylarking is the ninth studio album by the English rock band XTC, released 27 October 1986 on Virgin Records. Produced by American musician Todd Rundgren, it is a loose concept album about a nonspecific cycle, such as a day, a year, the seasons, or a life. The title refers to a type of bird (skylark), as well as the Royal Navy term "skylarking", which means "fooling around". It became one of XTC's best-known albums and is often regarded as one of their finest albums.

Like XTC's Dukes of Stratosphear side project, Skylarking was heavily influenced by the psychedelic music of the 1960s. Most of the album was recorded at Rundgren's Utopia Sound Studio in Woodstock, New York, with some work undertaken in San Francisco at the Tubes' studio; Tubes drummer Prairie Prince also drummed on the album. Rundgren played a large role in the album's sound design and drum programming, providing the band with orchestral arrangements and an assortment of equipment. However, the sessions were fraught with tension, especially between Rundgren and bandleader Andy Partridge, and numerous disagreements arose over drum patterns, song selections, and other details.

Upon release, Skylarking was met with indifference in the UK, peaking in the album charts at number 90, while both of its lead singles "Grass" (backed with "Dear God") and "The Meeting Place" peaked at number 100. In the US, "Dear God" became a college radio hit, causing US distributor Geffen Records to recall and repress Skylarking with the track included, and propelling the album to number 70. Following the song's growth in popularity, it was the subject of controversy in the country, inspiring many angry phone calls to radio stations and at least one bomb threat.

Skylarking has been included on "100 greatest albums of the 1980s" lists by Rolling Stone (in 1989) and Pitchfork (in 2002). In 2010, it was discovered that a wiring error made during the mastering process caused the album to have a "thin" sound, and the problem was corrected on subsequent remasters. In 2016, an expanded reissue was released by Partridge's Ape House label with demos, outtakes, and new stereo and 5.1 surround sound mixes by Steven Wilson. In 2024, Wilson mixed the album in Dolby Atmos for an updated reissue.

== Background ==
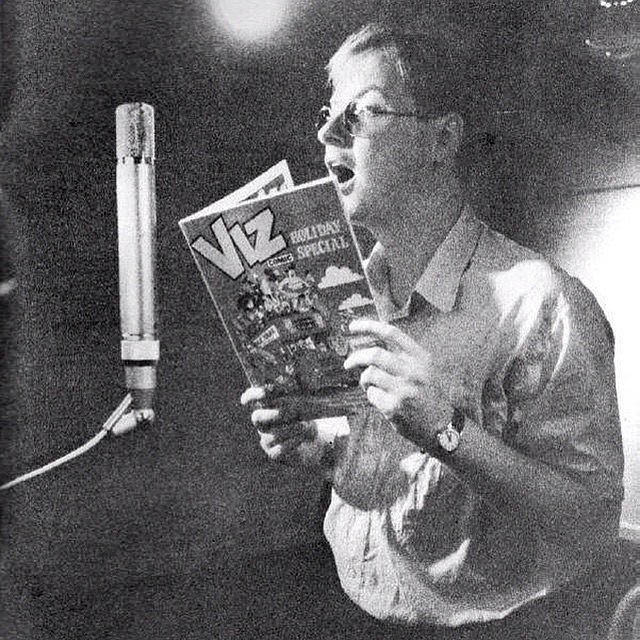
Andy Partridge (pictured 1988) wrote and sang most of Skylarking

In the 1980s, XTC underwent a gradual transition in their sound and image. Their albums became increasingly complex, and after frontman and songwriter Andy Partridge suffered a panic attack before a concert, the band ceased touring. In 1984, they released The Big Express, which sold poorly and attracted little critical notice. According to Partridge, the group's psychedelic influences had begun "leaking out" through the use of Mellotron, phasing, and "backwards so-and-so". They paid further homage to these influences on the mini-album 25 O'Clock, released on April Fools' Day 1985 and credited to "the Dukes of Stratosphear". 25 O'Clock outsold The Big Express in the UK even before "the Dukes" were revealed to be XTC. Partridge remembered: "That was a bit upsetting to think that people preferred these pretend personalities to our own personalities ... they're trying to tell us something."

During a routine meeting in early 1986, Virgin Records executives threatened to drop the band from the label if their next album failed to sell more than 70,000 units. One reason why the group was not selling enough records, the label reportedly concluded, was that they sounded "too English". As was the case for their other records, the label refused to allow the band to act as their own producers, even though Partridge was already established as a producer of other artists. Given a list of American producers to choose from by the label, the only name they recognized was Todd Rundgren. To Virgin, he appeared to be ideal for XTC, as he had a reputation for completing troubled projects on schedule and under budget, such as Badfinger's Straight Up (1971) and Meat Loaf's Bat Out of Hell (1977). XTC was a rare example, he said, "where I was both familiar with the band's previous work and unnecessary as a 'songcraft' agitator." He had also attended an XTC show in Chicago during their 1980 Black Sea tour.

Guitarist Dave Gregory was a fan of Rundgren's music, particularly since hearing his 1978 album Hermit of Mink Hollow, though his bandmates were not as familiar with Rundgren. For bassist Colin Moulding, "I'd seen him on stage, on TV, with his Utopia stuff, and I thought it was way over the bastard top ... Then Dave started playing me one or two things. I heard 'I Saw the Light,' and I thought, 'Christ, that's a really good song!' I didn't know he had that side to him." All that Partridge knew about Rundgren was his solo album Something/Anything? (1972). Gregory urged the group to work with him: "I reminded Andy that Todd had produced one of his favourite New York Dolls records [New York Dolls, 1973]. In the absence of any better alternatives, he agreed." Once contacted, Rundgren offered to handle the album's entire recording for a lump sum of $150,000—including tape costs, studio hire, lodging, and his production fee—which the band accepted.

== Concept and style ==
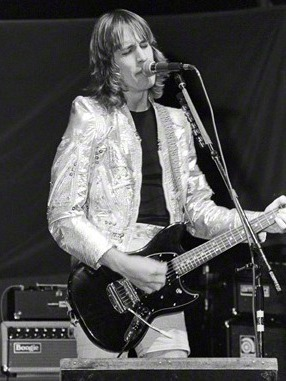
Skylarking producer Todd Rundgren, pictured in 1978

In January 1986, Partridge and Moulding mailed Rundgren a collection of more than 20 demo tapes they had stockpiled in advance of the album. Rundgren convinced the band that the songs they had written could form a concept album as a way to bridge what he described as "Colin's 'pastoral' tunes and subject matter and Andy's 'pop anthems' and sly poetry." He also suggested a provisional title, Day Passes, and said that the album

... could be about a day, a year, or a lifetime. ... there were songs that represented significant milestones along the way: birth, young love, family, labor, illness, death, sprinkled with moments of wonderment. Using this framework, I came up with a sequence of songs and a justification for their placement and brought it to the band.

The chosen songs were of a gentler atmosphere and relations were drawn between tempo, key, and subject matter. Partridge thought well of the selections, but was annoyed that the tracks and running order were determined so early on in the process, remarking that "you hadn't spoken to the bloke for three minutes, and he'd already been hacking and throwing your work in the bin". Further working titles included All Day Life, Rite, Rite Things, Leftover Rites, Summer Good, and Pink Things Sing. They settled on Skylarking, referring to a type of bird (skylark) and the Royal Navy slang term "skylarking", which means "fooling around". Partridge commented that the album espoused the feeling of "a playfully sexual hot summer ... It's just about summer and being out in the open and discovering sex in a stumbly, teenage way."

Similarly to 25 O'Clock, the music was heavily influenced by the 1960s psychedelic era. However, Skylarking contrasted significantly from earlier XTC efforts. As music critic A.D. Amorosi wrote, "More lyrically mature, lush and gently psychedelic than anything before in their catalog, Skylarking borrowed the hilly, holy feel of Mummer, as well as the ringing Beatles-ish vibe from ... The Big Express, but with a softly sweeping gracefulness and a finessed orchestral swirl." It has been variously described as an album of art rock, art pop, new wave, psychedelic pop, psychedelic rock, neo-psychedelia, post-punk, and chamber pop.

The album's lyrical themes include love, marriage and religion. The track "Dear God" has been called an "atheist anthem." Partridge surmised that the lyrical content of his songs had gradually become more worldly as result of his "coming off—rather abruptly—of 13 years of valium addiction" in 1981. He had also recently become a father and began listening to numerous Beach Boys albums, before which he had only been familiar with their singles. Moulding had recently listened to Pink Floyd's 1967 debut The Piper at the Gates of Dawn for the first time and was influenced by Syd Barrett's "free-form" songwriting style. The final tracklist featured five songs written by Moulding, which was much more than usual for the band; Partridge reflected that "I was already feeling sort of pushed out by Virgin. ... But, honestly, that was the best batch of material that Colin had ever offered up for". According to Moulding, "Todd chose the songs. I know for a fact that, had he not, my contribution in number would have been decidedly less. I was just grateful that the band had an independent arbiter."

== Production ==
=== Session difficulties ===
At the time I said it was like one bunker with two Hitlers. We were like rams butting our heads together.

— Andy Partridge

Collaborating with Rundgren proved to be difficult, especially for Partridge, and numerous disagreements arose over drum patterns, song selections, and other details. Partridge characterised Rundgren's musical preferences as "completely contradictory to mine": for instance, suggesting a fuzz guitar overdub where Rundgren wanted a mandolin. Moulding acknowledged that, until then, it was typical for Partridge to act as an "executive producer" for XTC's albums, frequently undermining the authority of the actual credited producer. According to Rundgren, "Essentially, it was kind of preordained by me what the record was going to be, which was something they never endured before. I think [Colin and Dave] trusted me, but Andy never did." Gregory intimated that "Todd and Andy were like chalk and cheese as personalities, they didn't hit it off from the start. Things just went from bad to worse."

Partridge was satisfied with Rundgren's arrangements but frustrated with the producer's "patronizing" and "so bloody sarcastic" tone and remarks during the sessions. As he remembered, "[Todd would] ask how you were going to do the vocals and you would stand in front of the mic and do one run through to clear your throat and he'd say, 'That was crap. I'll come down and I'll record me singing it and you can have me in your headphones to sing along to.'." Another line he recalled was: "You can dick around with [the track] for a few hours your way if you like. I'm going up to my house. When you find out it doesn't work your way, give me a call and we'll record it my way." He believed that the producer's role was "to keep us in line", however, and that Rundgren was successful in that respect. On the extent of the altercations, Rundgren said "there was the moment Andy said he wanted to cleave my head in half with an axe. But there was never anything physical. Just verbal abuse." Gregory stated that he was "quite happy to be directed by Todd instead of Andy." He thought that Rundgren "deliberately belittle[d Andy] if he thought he was getting too big for his boots. Andy rose to the bait every time." Moulding did not have "any problem with Todd", instead feeling that Partridge was "so unhappy and taking it out, a little bit, on me."

Usually [Andy's ideas were] to take out more air, to fill in some space with more sound. [...] So if you were looking at it on a [spectrogram], it would be completely flat [...] And you don't realize how hard it is to listen to that.

— Todd Rundgren

Rundgren had listened to The Big Express and concluded that the group had "lost track" of their studio indulgences. His style of embracing technical mistakes without allowing the members a chance to fix them was also a source of contention. Partridge often stated that this was because Rundgren wanted to spend as little money as possible, while Moulding said: "I don't believe that was the only reason. You could tell, that was his working method. He liked to do it because he's of the opinion—and I think I am as well—that the best take is where the band is running through while the engineer's trying to get a sound! That's the take that should be recorded, you know." At times when Partridge wanted to improve some part of the music, Rundgren would respond saying "Andy, it won't necessarily be 'better' – it'll just be different."

The band routinely played the theme from The Munsters whenever they could see Rundgren arriving to the studio. According to Partridge, Rundgren never realized this was a joke at his resemblance to Herman Munster. In spite of all the difficulties, Rundgren said the album "ultimately ... sounds like we were having a great time doing it. And at times we were having a good time." Based on the stories written about Skylarking, Partridge became known for being difficult to work with. Initially, he considered that he may have been wrong in his perception of the sessions. He later consulted with other artists who worked with Rundgren, only to find that "nine times out of ten they’ll say, 'Fuckin' hell, he was like that with us!'" After an argument about a bass part, Moulding stipulated that Partridge be banned from the studio while he finished recording his parts. In 1997, Moulding called it the "only real argument" between him and Partridge in the band's history.

=== Recording ===
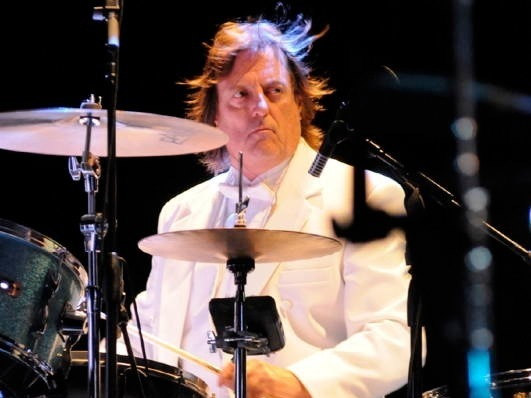
Prairie Prince of the Tubes was recruited as session drummer

All of the basic tracks were recorded in the same order as they appear on the album, as were the drum overdubs that followed. The recording sessions took place in early 1986 largely at Rundgren's Utopia Sound Studios in Woodstock, New York. Partridge described Utopia Sound—a two-story building located on the edge of a forest—as "a glorified log cabin". The band stayed at a nearby guest house while Rundgren lived in the "main house" up the road. They arrived without rehearsing the material because of the expectation that Rundgren would change the song structures anyway. In Moulding's recollection, "That was the problem with the whole record. ... everybody kept saying, 'There's no point in rehearsing!' ... I realized, 'I don't know any of these songs!' [laughs] 'Nobody's told me the chords! What'll we do?'" The project consumed only three reels of tape: one for side one, another for side two, and a third for extras and leftover tracks. Moulding remembered that "one track ran into another. No edits. Todd had a very unorthodox way of recording—15 ips. ... and done very quickly. Second takes were uncommon, but it was all charming in a way". Partridge considered these methods a "money-saving ruse", and believed that Rundgren "didn't wanna spend out on reels of tape". In Alfredo Marziano's book XTC: Skylarking. A Life in a Day: The Making of a Pop Classic, Colin Moulding and Dave Gregory provide details about the instruments they played on the record on a song-by-song basis. Gregory also gives thorough information about instruments and equipment used during the recording sessions.

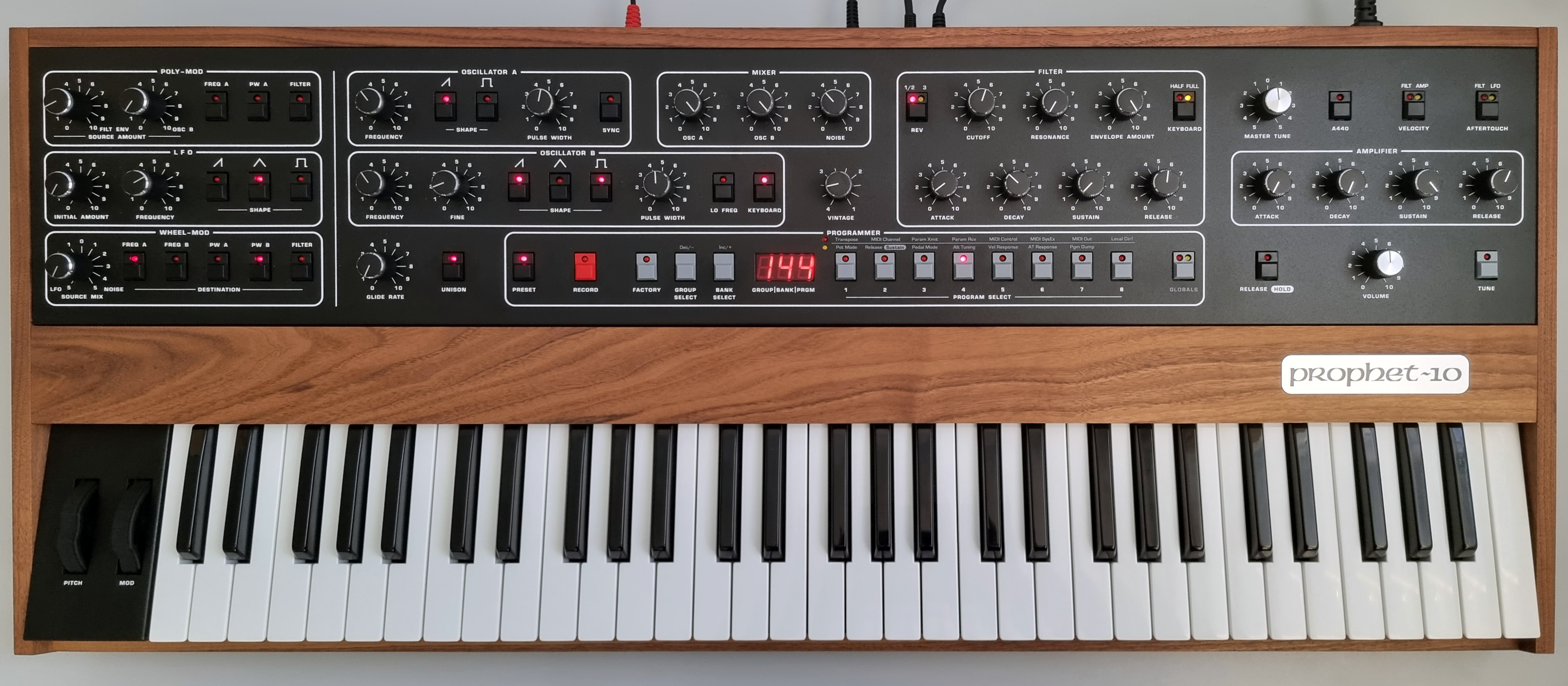
A Prophet 10 synthesizer, similar to the one used on the album

Rundgren played a large role in the album's sound design and drum programming, providing the band with string and brass arrangements, as well as an assortment of equipment that included a Fairlight CMI synthesizer and sampler, a Yamaha DX7 synthesizer, an E-mu Emulator sampler, a pre-MIDI LinnDrum drum machine, and a Prophet-10 synthesizer bought especially for the album. The only instruments the band had brought with them to the US were "about eight guitars". Gregory repaired a neglected Chamberlin keyboard that had become infested with mice. They spent the first week planning and setting markers for the tape space they needed. Another three weeks were spent programming percussion and other sequences on the Fairlight. For the first run of sessions at Woodstock, the group used the LinnDrum as a placeholder for percussion, which Gregory said "sounded very stiff and lifeless". Drum parts were overdubbed later at the Sound Hole Studios in San Francisco by the Tubes' Prairie Prince; Gregory said that "it was only then that the album started coming to life".

While in San Francisco, the band stayed at a condominium a few blocks away from Rundgren's apartment in the city. Partridge instructed Prince how to play his parts, although Prince occasionally suggested his own ideas. Prince later praised Partridge's "sense of rhythm ... that guy is just amazing. I'm not sure if I've actually ever heard him sit down and play a set of drums, but I think that he probably could do an excellent job. I know he's done some great drum programming." Moulding recalled that nothing apart from "some percussion" was recorded for the album until the band arrived in San Francisco to lay the drum tracks. Initially, Rundgren wanted Moulding to track his bass parts before the drums were recorded, but Moulding objected to this method. The orchestral arrangements were recorded at Sound Hole, as well as some of Moulding's bass tracks. Prince recalled that the group adopted "this big project calendar ... with all the instruments and vocal parts they wanted to add. As things got recorded, they would check them off and make notes about what takes they were happy with." Afterward, the band returned to Woodstock to record the rest of the album. When recording was complete, the band left Rundgren with a handmade book of mixing instructions, which he followed.

=== Sleeve design ===
The album's 2010 reissue sleeve was based on Partridge's original idea for the album's cover art.

The original sleeve design was to depict close-up shots of human pubic regions with flowers fitted into the hairs, female on the front and male on the back. Photo sessions were held, but record shops informed the label that they would not carry the album with that artwork, and so the idea was discarded. Partridge had also considered the rejected design for the cover of the "Grass" single.

As a last minute alternative, Partridge said, "I stole this very tasteful print from a classics concert in 1953 done by a chap called Hans Erney [sic]. I changed a few things on the drawing. I think on the original one the boy had a guitar and the girl had a flute, but we gave them both flutes. So it really was a tasteful alternative to the original sleeve, which really would have been suicide to put out."

On the back cover, the group are depicted wearing schoolgirl uniforms. Partridge's intention was to have the group dressed in Quaker outfits looking "really disapprovingly", but a miscommunication made when Partridge ordered the outfits led to the schoolgirl uniforms being used.

== Songs ==
=== Side one ===
==== "Summer's Cauldron" ====
"Summer's Cauldron" is an extension of a poem Partridge wrote called "Drowning in Summer's Cauldron". It is introduced with the sound of a bee that pans across the stereo channels. Rundgren provided the sample, along with other "summer sounds" such as crickets and barking dogs. The track emphasizes droning sounds and a "wobbly" chorused organ, the latter of which reminded Partridge of summer and the Beatles' "Blue Jay Way" (1967). Rundgren played melodica, Partridge recalled, "and we got to bully him! It was great." Prairie Prince was encouraged to play "spastic" drum fills in the style of Jethro Tull's "Sweet Dream" (1969). "Summer's Cauldron" segues seamlessly into the next track, an effect that was achieved in an unconventional manner. "When we said, 'How are we going to get from 'Summer's Cauldron' to 'Grass'?,' he [Rundgren] said, 'Well, you just put your hand on your instruments and stop the strings ringing and then we punch in the start of 'Grass.'"

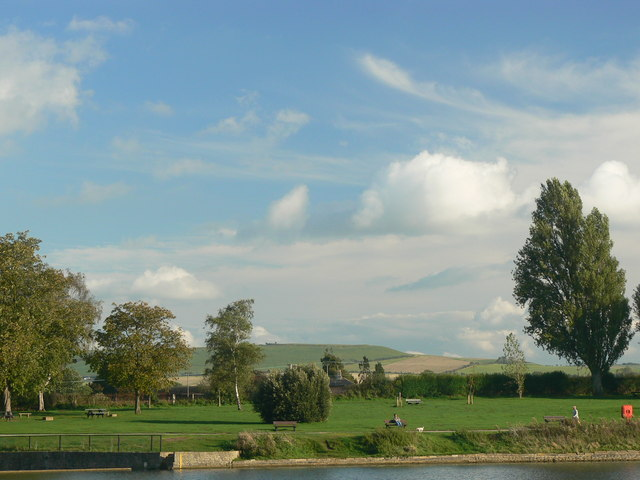
Coate Water, the setting of "Grass" (pictured 2006)

==== "Grass" ====
"Grass" is sometimes mistaken to be about cannabis use, but was actually written about youthful experiences at Coate Water Country Park in the band's hometown of Swindon. Moulding composed it on an open E-tuned guitar and found its harmonic changes by playing the chord shapes of Thunderclap Newman's "Something in the Air" (1969). The mixing of violin and guitar on the track was an idea lifted from John Lennon's "How Do You Sleep?" (1971). Rundgren added a tiple to the blend. Moulding originally sang the song with a deeper voice; Rundgren voiced concern that the effect was too close to "a molester", and so Moulding "did the Bowie thing and added an octave above it". The track bookends "Summer's Cauldron" with a reprise of its "insect chorus".

==== "The Meeting Place" ====
"The Meeting Place" is built on a "circular" guitar motif that reminded Moulding of the children's programme Toytown. He characterised it as "a childish, nursery-rhyme, bell-like, small town riff. As if you were looking down on Toytown, and it was me in the landscape, meeting my wife beside the factory or something, in our teens." The industrial noises at the beginning were samples sequenced on a Fairlight, one of which was the sound of the Swindon Works hooter, which was used as a signal for its workers. Swindon Works closed within a year of the song's recording. Among influences on the song, Moulding cited Syd Barrett, the Rolling Stones' "Factory Girl" (1968), and Billie Jo Spears' Blanket on the Ground" (1975).

==== "That's Really Super, Supergirl" ====
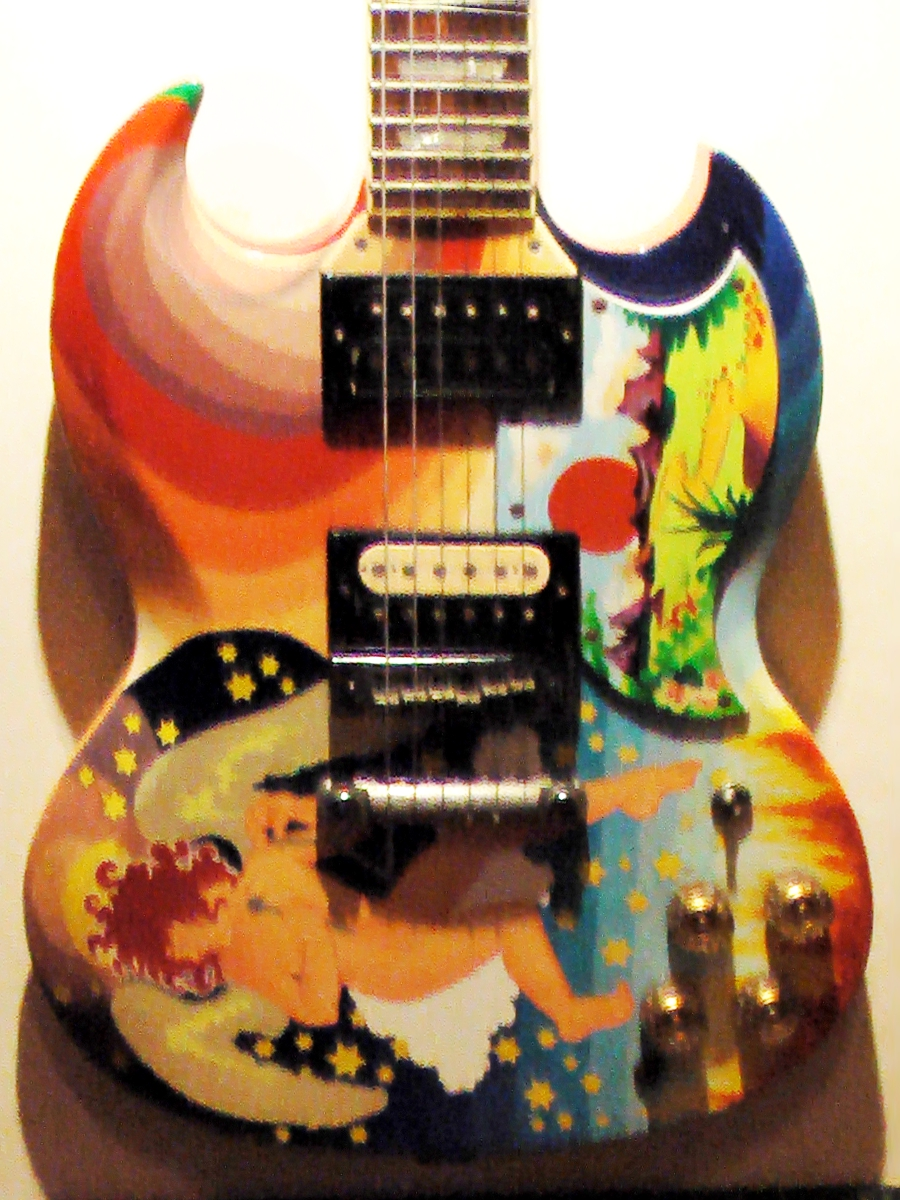
The Fool guitar was used for "That's Really Super, Supergirl" (pictured is a replica)

"That's Really Super, Supergirl" is a guitar-driven pop song that references the DC Comics character Supergirl, although Partridge stated the "Supergirl" in the song "isn't one girl—it's an amalgam of all the women who had better things to do than be around me... there's a facetious part of it, a little sarcasm in it." Its lyrics also mention kryptonite and Superman's Fortress of Solitude. Rundgren contributed the keyboard part but was left uncredited. Gregory: "We really didn't know what to do with it. It was just a 'B' side, and he could obviously see possibilities in it. One afternoon, we just left him to it." The snare was sampled from the Utopia album Deface the Music (1980); because of recording logistics, Prince and Moulding were forced to play around the beat. The guitar solo was played by Dave Gregory on Eric Clapton's psychedelic Gibson SG "the Fool", then owned by Rundgren. Gregory spent hours rehearsing the solo. Years after the fact, he realised that he had subconsciously lifted the solo's "little five-note runs" from a trumpet line on "Magic Dragon Theatre" from Utopia's Ra (1977).

==== "Ballet for a Rainy Day" ====
"Ballet for a Rainy Day", lyrically, is a portrait of a rainy town and its raincoats, fruits, and collapsing hairdos. Partridge stated that "The one thing I remember about the rain as a child was my mother cursing that her new hairdo was going to get ruined." Rundgren and Partridge argued over the lyric "silent film of melting miracle play"; Rundgren was unaware that "Miracle Plays" were medieval-era biblical performances, and thinking that Partridge was mistaken, requested that it be changed to "passion play". Partridge refused because he wanted to maintain the alliteration in "melting miracle". The lyric "Tickets for the front row seats up on the rooftops" is an homage to the Blue Nile's "A Walk Across the Rooftops" (1984). According to music critic Joe Stannard, "Ballet" and the two following tracks "distil the flawless orch-pop of Smile and Abbey Road into a handy three-song suite."

==== "1000 Umbrellas" ====
"1000 Umbrellas" is a more somber reflection on a rainy day and the second song about being "dumped" by a woman. Gregory spent weeks working on its string arrangement using a Roland MSQ-100 sequencer and a string patch on his Roland JX-P synthesizer. He said: "It was a rather doomy, miserable little thing with all those descending chromatic chords, and I thought, 'Oh dear, how can l cheer this miserable song up?'" Rundgren had not originally considered it for the album, since the demo consisted solely of Partridge on acoustic guitar, but was convinced to include it once he heard Gregory's arrangement. Partridge recalled that at one point, Gregory "took me on one side and said, 'I know what you mean by that lyric, 'How can you smile and forecast weather's getting better, if you've never let a girl rain all over you.' And I thought, 'How very enigmatic of you, Gregsy.'"

==== "Season Cycle" ====
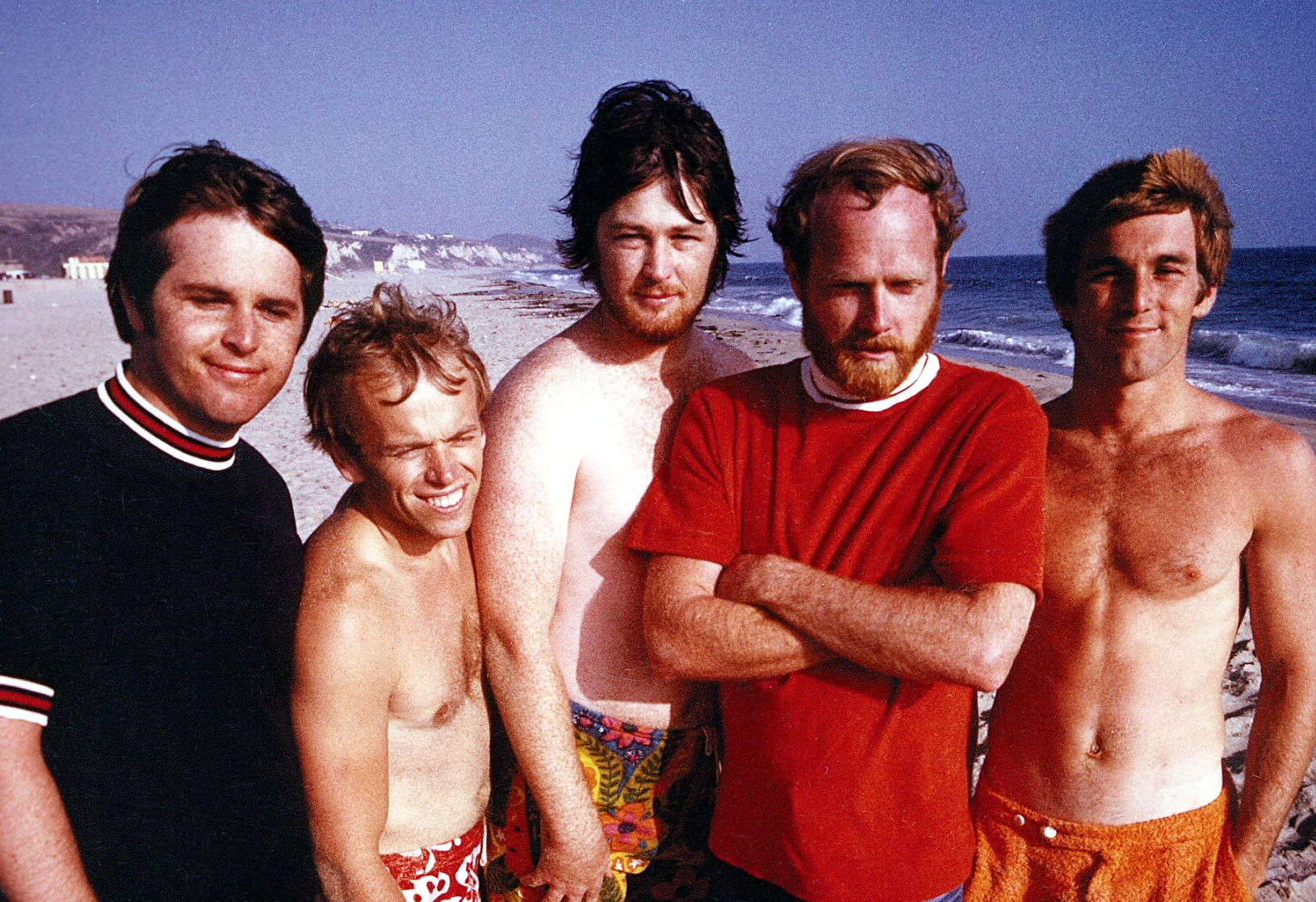
"Season Cycle" was inspired by the Beach Boys circa Smiley Smile (1967)

"Season Cycle", in its basic form, came to Partridge while walking his dog. The song was prominently influenced by the Beach Boys, but was not initially planned as a pastiche of the band, he said, "in fact, it started out very much like a folk song, very strummy. And just to kind of tie things up, I tried to do some other things going on at the same time, 'cause we're cross-melody maniacs in this band, but I thought it would be fun. Then I thought, 'Shit, this really does sound like the Beach Boys. Yeah, I'll make it sound a bit more like the Beach Boys!'." He felt that the end result was "nearer to Harpers Bizarre than the Beach Boys personally." In another interview, he stated that he was consciously inspired by the Beach Boys album Smiley Smile (1967) to write a song that appeared to be made up of many disparate musical sections. Gregory took issue with the dissonance in the second bridge, but Rundgren sided with Partridge on the view that it made the harmonic development more interesting. Rundgren, however, taunted Partridge for the lyric "about the baby and the umbilical".

=== Side two ===
==== "Earn Enough for Us" ====
"Earn Enough for Us" is a power pop song with subject matter similar to Partridge's previous "Love on a Farmboy's Wages". He wrote "Earn Enough" about his former days working at a paint shop. The lyric "I can take humiliation and hurtful comments from the boss" refers to the shop's owner, Middle Mr. Turnley, who would "come into the shop and go, 'Snort! snort! Look at ya, you fuckin' useless little cunt, snort! snort! You got a fuckin' girl's haircut, ya little cunt, snort!'" The opening riff was written by Gregory after some persuasion from Rundgren. Moulding temporarily left the group after a dispute over the bass line, which Partridge felt had been going in a direction that was too "bluesy".

==== "Big Day" ====
"Big Day" is about marriage and was dedicated to Moulding's teenage son Lee. It was first offered for 25 O'Clock but his bandmates thought it was too good for the Dukes project. Partridge envisioned the song as a single.

==== "Another Satellite" ====
"Another Satellite" is about Erica Wexler, a fan who caused tensions between Partridge and his wife, and ultimately became his romantic partner and musical collaborator. He previously wrote about Wexler for The Big Express songs "Seagulls Screaming Kiss Her Kiss Her" and "You're the Wish You Are I Had". Rundgren had initially rejected "Another Satellite", but it was included at the insistence of the band's A&R executive at Virgin, Jeremy Lascelles. Partridge expressed regret over releasing the song since it was hurtful to Erica, although "the story had a happy ending" once they rekindled a relationship in the 1990s. The "mordant, chiming rebuke" of the song, according to Stannard, "signals a shift into darker, more personal areas."

==== "Mermaid Smiled" ====
"Mermaid Smiled" is a "jazzy" song inspired by a board book Partridge owned as a child. The title means "getting back in touch with the child in you. And the key to that is something as frivolous as a smile on a mermaid." It was composed in D^{6} tuning (D–A–D–A–B–F) and came about when he discovered a riff that he felt had an underwater quality to it. He wrote a poem containing some of the lyrics, called "Book Full of Sea", but could not remember if it was before or after he had the "Raga-mama-Raga" guitar motif: "I started to throw my hands around the fretboard and discovered some great-sounding stuff – all simple chords. They're just straight barres or real simple shapes. It just sort of said rock pools and mermaids and breakers crashing." Rundgren arranged the song in the style of Bobby Darin, while Partridge reflected that it bore the influence of "really cheesy jazz – Martin Denny, Esquivel, Les Baxter – with goofy steel guitars and people singing ‘zu, zu, zu’ and stuff." The track features tabla, bongos, muted trumpets, and sampled vibraphones from a Fairlight; the latter two are reflected in the lyrics "from pools of xylophone clear" and "compose with trumpeting shell". Partridge found that the percussion gave the song an Indian feel and tried expanding upon it by singing flattened quarter notes, an idea that Rundgren rejected.

==== "The Man Who Sailed Around His Soul" ====
"The Man Who Sailed Around His Soul" is an existentialist beatnik song that "just says you're born, you live, and you die," Partridge explained. "Why look for the meaning of life when all there is is death and decay." The melody was inspired by the Nat King Cole version of "Nature Boy" (1948). Rundgren's arrangement was based on the music of 1960s spy films, which happened to be in an idiom similar to "Mermaid Smiled". Partridge: "I had in my head that I really wanted to out-do 'Mack the Knife' — the Bobby Darin version. ... [and] it sounded like a spy film title to me. So I thought, 'It'd be great to do sort of a John Barry secret-agent soundtrack thing.' ... I said to Todd, 'Ideally, make it like a Beatnik existential spy movie soundtrack. Can such a thing be done?' And literally, he went away overnight and came back with charts for this stuff." Partridge instructed Prince to drum like a "jazz junkie drummer". Prince surmised that he may have unconsciously "channeled" the influence of big band drummer Gene Krupa on the track.

==== "Dear God" ====
"Dear God"
Sample of "Dear God".

"Dear God" is about an agnostic who writes a letter to God challenging his existence. The song was conceived in a skiffle style, but while playing the Beatles' "Rocky Raccoon" (1968), Partridge was inspired to move "Dear God" closer to that song's direction. "Dear God" was not included on original pressings of Skylarking, but it was always intended to be on the album.

==== "Dying" ====
"Dying" was inspired by an elderly neighbor of Moulding's named Bertie. It was wrongly assumed to be about his father, Charlie Moulding, who had died of a heart attack in 1983. Colin had recently purchased a house in the Swindon countryside: "We didn't see him [Bertie] for the first six months and thought he might be dead. But people in the village said that he'd recently lost his wife and had become very quiet and sad. ... He used to get these attacks and be very short of breath. But he loved to talk about the old ways." The sampled clarinet solo was played on a Chamberlin.

==== "Sacrificial Bonfire" ====
"Sacrificial Bonfire" attempts to set the scene of an Iron Age ritual. Moulding started with a pagan-sounding guitar riff: "There was a touch of 'The Sorcerer's Apprentice' and a bit of Arthur Brown's 'Fire' in it, I suppose. But I wasn't moralizing. It was just that this was an evil piece of music and good would triumph over it." Rundgren contributed a string arrangement, something Moulding had not envisioned for the song. He said "it made the last two bars of the album more optimistic, which I think fitted into his original Day Passes concept. It was the dawn of another day." Partridge concurred: "It was a good ending to the album, fading deep into the night. It just leaves you in blackness with the slightest hint that dawn is coming."

=== Leftover ===
"Let's Make a Den", according to Partridge, is about "the idea that you play all these games and then do it in real life. First it's a den and then it's a real house. I had finally got my own home and didn't like the idea of losing it because England might get caught up in a war caused by Ronald Reagan's 'Star Wars' sabre rattling." The song was in Rundgren's original concept of Skylarking, but he wanted Partridge to change the time signature from 7/4 to 8/4. Partridge fought over this detail, "I wanted this keenness and childish joy which you get from the seven/four meter. I also wanted the rhythm track to have banging Coke cans and stuff, the things that kids would do." Prince was a witness to Rundgren and Partridge's arguments regarding the song: "I thought it was cool, but then Todd ... said, 'You know, I really don't like this song, I don't think it fits with the whole scheme of this album.' And that's when they started arguing—Andy was saying, 'Well, why not?' He gave some long explanation why it should, and Todd just kind of put his foot down, and didn't want to do it."

"Extrovert" is Partridge's rumination on overcoming his shyness. Its more aggressive and bombastic tone contrasts significantly with the other Skylarking songs. The song was recorded as a single B-side and was the last tracked for the sessions. Partridge sang the lead vocal while inebriated. After the band returned to England, they agreed to Rundgren overdubbing some brass samples, although he ultimately got the chords wrong. The demo tracks "Terrorism", "The Troubles", and "Find the Fox" were all rejected by Rundgren on the grounds that they did not fit in the album's concept, and they were never tracked for the sessions.

== Release ==
Contemporary professional ratings
Review scores
Source	Rating
The Philadelphia Inquirer	4/4 stars
Q	4/5 stars
The Village Voice	A−

Lead single "Grass", backed with "Dear God" in the UK, was released in August 1986. Skylarking followed on 27 October 1986. It spent one week on the UK album charts, reaching No. 90 in November. In the US, radio stations were sent a promotional disc, Skylarking with Andy Partridge, which featured interviews with the group and Rundgren. A second single, "The Meeting Place", was issued in 1987. Demos of "Let's Make a Den", "The Troubles", "Find the Fox", and "Terrorism" were remixed at Crescent Studios and released as bonus tracks to the singles. Both "Grass" and "The Meeting Place" reached No. 100 on the UK Singles Chart.

Tim Sommer of Rolling Stone praised the album as "the most inspired and satisfying piece of Beatle-esque pop since ... well, since the Beatles" and drew favourable comparisons to the Beatles (Revolver, Rubber Soul), the Beach Boys (Pet Sounds) and the Kinks (Village Green Preservation Society). Creem's Karen Schlosberg dubbed it a "masterpiece" and a "somewhat baroque and ethereally-textured collection". She lamented that it was unlikely the album would receive much radio play, "since the lads' sound is probably too different to sit well with contemporary radio programming standards. Another irony, since XTC is constantly being compared to one of the most successful groups in pop history, the Beatles." Billboard reviewed: "The overall tone here is less hard-edged than in past work; the band never takes the easy way out, however, employing unique sounds and unexpected melodic twists to wonderful effect."

Robert Christgau awarded the record an A− with his only criticism being "when the topics become darker and more cosmic ... they clutter things with sound and whimsy". Also from Rolling Stone, Rob Tannenbaum's 1987 review said the album's craftsmanship was "a remarkable achievement", but decried that the album's "trading of the acute modernism that marked such classics as 'This Is Pop' and 'Making Plans for Nigel' for domestic solitude dampens the band's punk-roots energy and also limits its emotional spectrum. ... Partridge complains. But then he apologizes to his ex for being "rude" to her. Being rude is the point of breakup songs, and a shot of rudeness is just what XTC could use now."

Promotional videos were created for "Grass" and "Dear God" (both directed by Nick Brandt). The Channel 4 music program The Tube also produced videos for "The Meeting Place" and "The Man Who Sailed Around His Soul" filmed in Portmeirion, Wales, with the band wearing costumes from the television series The Prisoner. The music video for "Dear God" received the 1987 Billboard Best Video award and was nominated for three categories at the MTV Video Music Awards.

=== "Dear God" controversy ===
Early sales were hampered by the omission of "Dear God" from the album's original pressings. It was left off because Jeremy Lascelles was concerned about the album's length and advised that the song may upset American audiences. Partridge recalled: "I reluctantly agreed because I thought I hadn't written a strong enough take on religion. I thought I'd kind of failed." Rundgren had a different recollection, and said that Partridge demanded that the song be pulled because "He was afraid that there would be repercussions personally for him for taking on such a thorny subject... I called them and said, 'This is a mistake.'" Partridge denied such accusations: "if you can't have a different opinion without them [people upset by the song] wanting to firebomb your house then that's their problem."

"Dear God" was ultimately released as the B-side to the UK lead single "Grass", but due to its popularity with American DJs, the album was reissued in the US, with "Mermaid Smiled" removed and "Dear God" cross-faded into the following track, "Dying", giving the second edition of the US album a revised track sequence. Partridge commented: "I got backed into a corner on that. They said that we had to take something off to put this one on 'cause of the limitations of vinyl and such. I think I wanted to take off 'Dying' and part of me said no, lyrically it's very honest and good, and so 'Dying' stayed."

In June 1987, the A-sided "Dear God" single was released in both markets, reaching No. 99 in the UK, and No. 37 in the US Mainstream Rock chart. Some controversy broke out over the song's anti-religious lyrics, which inspired some violent incidents. In Florida, a radio station received a bomb threat, and in New York, a student forced their school to play the song over its public-address system by holding a faculty member at knife-point. Nonetheless, the commercial success of "Dear God" propelled Skylarking to sell more than 250,000 units, and it raised the band's profile among American college youth. In the US, the album spent 29 weeks on the Billboard 200 album charts and reached its peak position of No. 70 in June 1987.

== Polarity issue ==
On the request of XTC and Virgin Records, Rundgren submitted three different mixdowns of the album before quitting the project. The first mix was believed to be lacking in dynamics, while the second was rejected for containing numerous pops, clicks, and digital dropouts. According to Partridge, both the label and the band were dissatisfied with the final mix; "We all thought [it was] poor and thin ... There was no bass on it, no high tops, and the middle sounded muddy." Gregory similarly recalled that it was badly recorded.

Decades later, it was discovered that the album's master tapes were engineered with an improper sound polarity. Mastering engineer John Dent, who discovered the flaw in 2010, attributed it to a wiring error between the multitrack recording and stereo mixing machines, which would not have been aurally evident until after the tapes left Rundgren's studio. Dent was able to correct the issue, and his master was released by Partridge's APE House label exclusively on vinyl that same year. In 2016, Rundgren contended that the problem either did not exist or was not his fault: "I think it's total bullshit. But if such a thing existed, it's because they changed the running order on it and had to remaster it – which I had nothing to do with." The master with corrected polarity was eventually issued on CD as well.

== Retrospective reviews and legacy ==
Retrospective professional ratings
Review scores
Source	Rating
AllMusic	5/5 stars
Chicago Tribune	4/4 stars
Encyclopedia of Popular Music	5/5 stars
Mojo	5/5 stars
Pitchfork	9.3/10
Q	5/5 stars
Record Collector	5/5 stars
The Rolling Stone Album Guide	5/5 stars
Uncut	9/10

Upon release, Skylarking received much critical acclaim. It became XTC's best-known album and generally regarded as their finest work. Dave Gregory recalled that two years after its release, he learned that XTC's recent work was "hugely influential" in the US. Music journalist Michael Azerrad wrote that with Skylarking, the band had become "deans of a group of artists who make what can only be described as unpopular pop music, placing a high premium on melody and solid if idiosyncratic songcraft." Mojo's Ian Harrison wrote that regardless of the "businesslike-to-hostile rather than chummy" relationship between Rundgren and the band, "the results were sublime". PopMatters's Patrick Schabe cited it as the album where XTC "blossomed into full maturity", while Uncut's Joe Stannard called it "the album that tied up everything great about Swindon's finest into one big beautiful package of perfect pop".

Moulding said of the album: "Perhaps it lacked the polish of some of the other recordings we had made, but it was the character that was sewn into the record which was its strength. ... Positively naive at times." Gregory called the finished product "probably my favourite XTC album", expressing appreciation of how Rundgren handled the songs. In a promotional insert included with their album Nonsuch (1992), Partridge wrote "Musician and producer Todd Rundgren squeezed the XTC clay into its most complete/connected/cyclical record ever. Not an easy album to make for various ego reasons but time has humbled me into admitting that Todd conjured up some of the most magical production and arranging conceivable. A summer's day cooked into one cake."

In 1989, Skylarking was listed at number 48 on Rolling Stone magazine's list of the 100 greatest albums of the 1980s. The staff at Pitchfork Media placed the album at 15 on their 2002 list of the "Top 100 Albums of the 1980s". Site contributor Dominique Leone felt that Rundgren's production added warmth to the band's "clever-but-distant" songs. Slant Magazine listed the album at 67 on its list of the "Best Albums of the 1980s", It was voted number 830 in Colin Larkin's All Time Top 1000 Albums (2000). The album was also included in the book 1001 Albums You Must Hear Before You Die.

== Track listing ==
Skylarking was originally issued without the track "Dear God". After 1987, "Mermaid Smiled" was replaced by "Dear God". After 2001, track listings included both "Dear God" and "Mermaid Smiled".

=== Original vinyl ===
All tracks are written by Andy Partridge, except where noted.

Side one
No.	Title	Writer(s)	Length
1.	"Summer's Cauldron"		3:19
2.	"Grass"	Colin Moulding	3:05
3.	"The Meeting Place"	Moulding	3:14
4.	"That's Really Super, Supergirl"		3:21
5.	"Ballet for a Rainy Day"		2:50
6.	"1000 Umbrellas"		3:44
7.	"Season Cycle"		3:21

Side two
No.	Title	Writer(s)	Length
8.	"Earn Enough for Us"		2:54
9.	"Big Day"	Moulding	3:32
10.	"Another Satellite"		4:15
11.	"Mermaid Smiled"		2:26
12.	"The Man Who Sailed Around His Soul"		3:24
13.	"Dying"	Moulding	2:31
14.	"Sacrificial Bonfire"	Moulding	3:49
Total length:			45:47

=== 2016/2024 expanded editions ===
In 2016, an expanded CD and Blu-ray edition of Skylarking was issued on Partridge's Ape House label. It included new 2.0 stereo and 5.1 surround sound mixes by Steven Wilson.

An updated version of the CD/Blu-ray edition was released on Ape House in September 2024, adding a new Dolby Atmos mix of the album and its bonus tracks by Wilson. This makes Skylarking the second XTC album to be released in Atmos following the 2023 reissue of The Big Express, which had not previously been included in the band's "Surround Sound Series" due to a years-long search for its original multitrack tapes.

All tracks are written by Andy Partridge, except where noted.

2016 stereo mix
No.	Title	Writer(s)	Length
1.	"Summer's Cauldron"		3:20
2.	"Grass"	Colin Moulding	3:07
3.	"The Meeting Place"	Moulding	3:16
4.	"That's Really Super, Supergirl"		3:23
5.	"Ballet for a Rainy Day"		3:07
6.	"1000 Umbrellas"		3:29
7.	"Season Cycle"		3:31
8.	"Earn Enough for Us"		2:58
9.	"Big Day"	Moulding	3:33
10.	"Another Satellite"		4:26
11.	"Mermaid Smiled"		2:29
12.	"The Man Who Sailed Around His Soul"		3:27
13.	"Dear God"		3:40
14.	"Dying"	Moulding	2:35
15.	"Sacrificial Bonfire"	Moulding	3:49

Bonus 2016 mixes
No.	Title	Length
16.	"Extrovert"	3:40
17.	"Let's Make a Den"	2:19
18.	"The Troubles"	3:30
19.	"Little Lighthouse"	3:22
Total length:		63:04

- 2016 5.1 mix – same running order as 2016 stereo mix
- 2016 instrumental mix – same running order as 2016 stereo mix
- 2001 stereo remaster – same running order as original vinyl (includes bonus tracks "Dear God" and "Extrovert")
- 2010 corrected polarity remaster – same running order as 2016 stereo mix (minus bonus tracks)
- Album in demo and work tape form – same running order as 2016 stereo mix (minus bonus tracks)
- 2024 Dolby Atmos mix - same running order as 2016 stereo mix

Andy's non-album demos
No.	Title	Length
66.	"1000 Umbrellas" (Early acoustic run through)
67.	"Season Cycle" (Early sketch)
68.	"Another Satellite" (Early sketch)
69.	"Summer's Cauldron" (Early sketch)
70.	"Earn Enough for Us" (Early sketch)
71.	"Ballet for a Rainy Day" (Early sketch)
72.	"Dear God" (Early 'skiffle' version)
73.	"Mermaid Smiled" (Explanation version)
74.	"Let's Make a Den" (Early idea)
75.	"Let's Make a Den"
76.	"Little Lighthouse" (Early version)
77.	"Little Lighthouse" (Intro section)
78.	"Little Lighthouse"
79.	"Terrorism" (Early idea)
80.	"Terrorism"
81.	"Extrovert"
82.	"The Troubles"
83.	"Lumpen Splendour"
84.	"Ra Ra for Red Rocking Horse" (Rehearsal at Dave's)
85.	"Ra Ra for Red Rocking Horse"
86.	"When We Get to England"
87.	"Shaking Skin House"
88.	"Obscene Procession"
89.	"Across the Antheap"

Colin's non-album work tapes
No.	Title	Writer(s)	Length
90.	"Halley's Comet"	Moulding
91.	"Find the Fox"	Moulding

Videos
No.	Title	Length
92.	"Grass"
93.	"Dear God"

== Personnel ==
Credits adapted from the original and the 2016 sleeves.

XTC

- Andy Partridge – vocals, guitars
- Colin Moulding – vocals, bass guitar (also credited as "bonfire")
- Dave Gregory – vocals, guitar, piano, synthesizers, Chamberlin, string arrangements on "1000 Umbrellas" and "Dear God", tiple

Additional personnel and technical staff

- Todd Rundgren – producer, engineer, melodica on "Summer's Cauldron", synthesizers on "Grass" and "That's Really Super, Supergirl", backing vocals, orchestral arrangements and computer programming (also credited with "continuity concept")
- Prairie Prince – drums (credited as "the part of the time bomb")
- Mingo Lewis – percussion
- Jasmine Veillette – vocals on "Dear God"
- Kim Foscato – assistant engineer
- George Cowan – assistant engineer
- Dave Dragon – sleeve drawings
- Cindy Palmano – photography
- Ken Ansell – typography

Orchestral players

- John Tenney – violin
- Emily Van Valkenburgh – violin
- Rebecca Sebring – viola
- Teresa Adams – cello
- Charlie McCarthy – alto and tenor saxophones and flute
- Bob Ferreira – tenor saxophone, piccolo flute and bass clarinet
- Dave Bendigkeit – trumpet
- Dean Hubbard – trombone

The sleeve additionally credits "the Beech Avenue Boys" with backing vocals. They are actually XTC under a pseudonym; the credit is an inside joke referencing the Beach Boys and a street in Swindon. Special thanks were given to the Tubes, "who let us use their amplifiers", and the Dukes of Stratosphear, "who loaned us their guitars".

== Charts ==
Chart performance for Skylarking
Chart (1986–1987)	Peak position
UK Albums Chart	90
US Billboard 200	70
