= The Meeting Place (song) =

Single by XTC

from the album Skylarking
- B-side: "The Man Who Sailed Around His Soul"
- Released: 2 February 1987
- Recorded: 1986
- Length: 3:14; 3:51 (home demo version)
- Label: Virgin
- Songwriter(s): Colin Moulding
- Producer(s): Todd Rundgren

XTC singles chronology
| "Grass" (1986) | "The Meeting Place" (1987) | "Dear God" (1987) |

"The Meeting Place" is a song written by Colin Moulding of the English rock band XTC, released on their 1986 album Skylarking. It was the second single issued from the album and reached number 100 on the UK Singles Chart.

== Background ==
"The Meeting Place" is built on a "circular" guitar motif that reminded Moulding of the children's programme Toytown. He characterised it as "a childish, nursery-rhyme, bell-like, small town riff. As if you were looking down on Toytown, and it was me in the landscape, meeting my wife beside the factory or something, in our teens." The industrial noises at the beginning were samples sequenced on a Fairlight, one of which was the sound of the Swindon Works hooter, which was used as a signal for its workers. Swindon Works closed within a year of the song's recording. Among influences on the song, Moulding cited Syd Barrett, the Rolling Stones' "Factory Girl" (1968), and Billie Jo Spears' Blanket on the Ground" (1975).

== Promotional video ==
The Channel 4 music program The Tube produced videos for "The Meeting Place" and "The Man Who Sailed Around His Soul" filmed in Portmeirion with the band wearing costumes from The Prisoner.

== Track listing ==
12-inch vinyl, side one

1. "The Meeting Place"
2. "The Man Who Sailed Around His Soul"

12-inch vinyl, side two

1. "Terrorism" (home demo)
2. "Let's Make a Den" (home demo)
3. "Find the Fox" (home demo)
4. "The Troubles" (home demo)

== Charts ==
| Chart (1987) | Peak position |
|---|---|
| UK Singles (OCC) | 100 |
