= Garden of Earthly Delights =

Song by XTC

from the album Oranges & Lemons
- Released: 27 February 1989
- Recorded: 1988
- Genre: Psychedelic
- Length: 5:02
- Label: Virgin
- Songwriter(s): Andy Partridge
- Producer(s): Paul Fox

Audio sample
- file; help

"Garden of Earthly Delights" is a song written by Andy Partridge of the English rock band XTC, released as the opening track on their 1989 album Oranges & Lemons. Partridge wrote the song as a children's guide to the world dedicated to his son Harry Partridge. He intended it to sound "like this crazy tapestry of camels and elephants and belly dancers and all the Arabian Nights, interwoven -- a big ornate Eastern rug come to life." It features Arabic modalities and a guitar solo played through two harmonizers set to different intervals.

== Background and lyrics ==
The 16th-century painting The Garden of Earthly Delights, from which the song derives its title

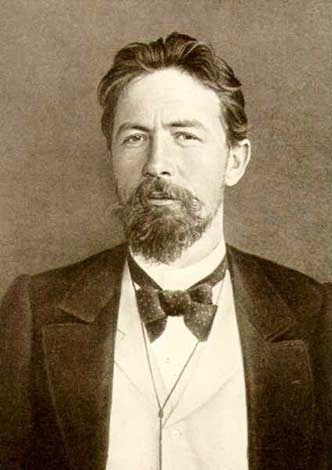
Russian playwright Anton Chekhov is given a passing reference in the song's lyric

Andy Partridge wrote "Garden of Earthly Delights" as a children's guide to the world dedicated to his son Harry Partridge. He said the song stemmed from "a little musical figure" he found playing a guitar's D string, which led to the lyrics and Arabic feel. Partridge had used the name as a working title for the theme to the 1983 film Ocean's Daughter. In the liner notes to Fuzzy Warbles, he wrote that the theme's melody "was from a song I was working on [at the time] called 'Garden of Earthly Delights'." In a 2007 phone interview, he refused to answer whether the lyric "can't all think like Chekov" refers to the Star Trek character, Pavel Chekov, or the Russian playwright, Anton Chekhov. In Neville Farmer's 1998 biography Song Stories, it is stated that Partridge had the playwright in mind.

== Production ==
"Garden of Earthly Delights" became the lead track on Oranges & Lemons (1989). According to Stereogum writer Robert Ham, the song's "too-generous" production exemplified the general sound of the record. Partridge intended it to sound "like this crazy tapestry of camels and elephants and belly dancers and all the Arabian Nights, interwoven -- a big ornate Eastern rug come to life." His reaction to listening to the song for the first time after many years was "Jesus there's a lot on this track!"

The song features modalities associated with Arabic music. Its introduction noises were a preset sample called "Eastern Bazaar" taken from one of producer Paul Fox's synthesizers. The drum track is a mixture of Pat Mastelloto's live drumming and samples of his playing. Colin Moulding thought of the bassline as the onomatopoeia "izzy balooba", spoken by Jambi the Genie from Pee-Wee's Playhouse. One of the slide-down parts was played by turning down the tuning peg of his bass guitar. The guitar solo, played by Partridge, was filtered through two harmonizers set to different intervals.

Mastelotto laid claim to the coda section: "I'd had this idea, from way back, to try and put a coda on the song, so I threw it at the guys -- we got to the end of a pretty good take, I turned around to my Yamaha QX, spun the dial to slow down the tempo, hit 'go' again, and we ended up with that slowed-down coda. The guys all just started jamming with me, and we kind of just got lucky!"

== Personnel ==
XTC

- Dave Gregory – rhythm guitar
- Colin Moulding – bass guitar
- Andy Partridge – vocals, lead and rhythm guitar

Additional musicians

- Pat Mastelotto – drums

Per Partridge.

== Variants ==
- BBC Radio version, released on Transistor Blast: The Best of the BBC Sessions (1998)
- Home demo and studio instrumental versions, released on the 2015 expanded edition of Oranges & Lemons
