= Open E tuning =

Guitar tuning

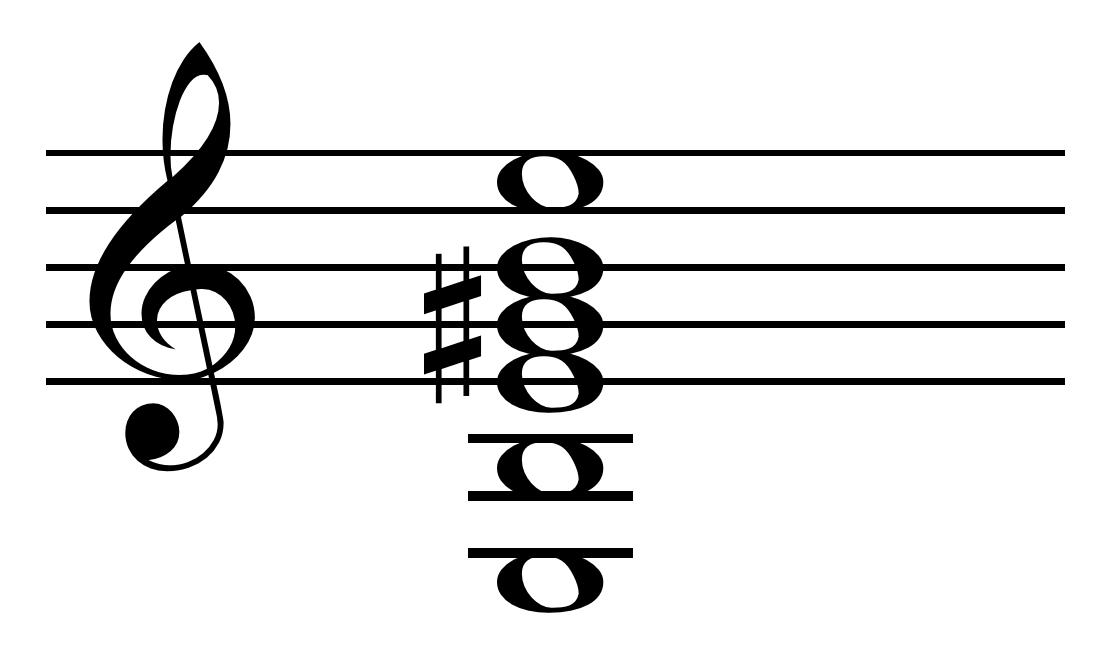
Open E tuning

Open E tuning is a tuning for guitar: low to high, E-B-E-G♯-B-E.

Compared to standard tuning, two strings are two semitones higher and one string is one semitone higher. The intervals are identical to those found in open D tuning. In fact, it is common for players to keep their guitar tuned to open d and place a capo over the second fret. This use of a capo allows for quickly changing between open D and open E without having to manipulate the guitar's tuning pegs.

Familiar examples of open E tuning include the distinctive song "Bo Diddley" by Bo Diddley, the beginning guitar part on the song "Jumpin' Jack Flash" and the rhythm guitar on "Gimme Shelter" by The Rolling Stones, as well as their distinctly earthy blues song "Prodigal Son" from the Beggars Banquet album, originally by Robert Wilkins. The whole of Bob Dylan's Blood on the Tracks album was recorded in open E tuning, although some of the songs were re-recorded in standard tuning prior to the album's release. The tuning is also used in The Black Crowes' "She Talks to Angels", Glen Hansard's "Say It To Me Now", Joe Walsh's "Rocky Mountain Way", Rush's "Headlong Flight", Dave Mason's "We Just Disagree", The Faces' "Stay With Me", Billy F. Gibbons in "Just Got Paid", The Smiths' "The Headmaster Ritual", and Hoobastank's "Crawling In The Dark". It is also Derek Trucks' usual open tuning for "Midnight in Harlem" and is used for the guitar on Blink-182's "Feeling This". Open E tuning also lends itself to easy barre-chording as heard in some of these songs. Chris Martin of Coldplay also uses this tuning live in the song "Hurts Like Heaven", but puts a capo on at the sixth fret.

Open E tuning is often used for slide guitar, as it constitutes an open chord, which can be raised by moving the slide further up the neck. Most notably Duane Allman used open E for the majority of his slide work, such as in "Statesboro Blues".

== See also ==
- Guitar tunings
- List of guitar tunings
